= Picasso: Magic, Sex & Death =

2001 three-episode film documentary series

- Directed by: Christopher Bruce (Episodes 1 and 3); Waldemar Januszczak (Episode 2)
- Starring: John Richardson
- Country of origin: United Kingdom
- Original language: English

Production
- Running time: 153 minutes total
- Production company: Channel 4

Original release
- Release: 2001

Picasso: Magic, Sex, & Death (2001) is a three-episode Channel 4 film documentary series on the artist Pablo Picasso. Presented by the artist's friend and biographer John Richardson, it was directed by Christopher Bruce and British art critic Waldemar Januszczak, who was also the series director. On-screen contributors include Picasso descendants such as Paloma Picasso, Bernard Ruiz-Picasso, Diana Widmaier-Picasso, Maya Picasso, and Claude Picasso; along with authorities such as Mary Ann Caws, Billy Klüver, Gérard Régnier, James Lord, Bernard Minoret, Robert Rosenblum, Linda Gasman, Marilyn McCully, David Gilmore and Gertje Utley; one former mistress (Francoise Gilot); and one flirtation (Sylvette David).

== Synopsis ==
=== Magic ===
This 53-minute episode covers the period from Picasso's birth to 1916.

Biographer Richardson tours the locations of Picasso's early life, but starts with the Château de Castille near Avignon where he and Douglas Cooper had once hosted the painter and his coterie in the 1950s. Contemporaneous paintings are presented and discussed while sites with family associations, such as the cathedral of Malaga (the city where he was born) and the Moorish castle ("his playground"), are visited. La Coruña, where the Picasso family relocated, is briefly glimpsed before moving on to Barcelona where he lived beginning in 1895. Richardson chats with descendants of Picasso's associates there at Els Quatre Gats (4 Cats), the legendary tavern and brothel that was the focal point of his life then.

Picasso's true bohemian life began in 1900 in Montmartre, Paris, where his best friend Carlos Casagemas — poet, painter, addict — committed suicide the next year and influenced some of Picasso's important early works. Picasso's gang gathered at the Lapin Agile (poets Guillaume Apollinaire and Max Jacob, various women). During this time the persistent themes of the harlequin and masks emerged in Picasso's work (e.g., The Saltimbanques).

In 1904 he moved to a ramshackle, wooden warren of rooms known as Le Bateau-Lavoir ("the Acropolis of Cubism"). There he met the model Fernande Olivier ("La Belle Fernande"), who became his muse. They took opium and vacationed at Gósol, Spain, where the local red limestone showed up in the colors of his "Rose Period" paintings. Fernande's image morphed from that of a classical goddess to an Earth Mother after Picasso's exposure to prehistoric Iberian sculpture.

It was the then virtually unknown El Greco painting Opening of the Fifth Seal, along with a visit to the African tribal masks in the Trocadéro Ethnographical Museum, that combined to inspire the epoch-making Les Demoiselles d'Avignon (1907). The centrality of tribal art, and its magical functions, had the most profound impact on Picasso. Over seven years, he and Georges Braque also invented Cubism.

A new girlfriend - Marcelle Humbert, known as "Eva" — suffered a lingering death from cancer while the not-inattentive Picasso consoled himself with Gaby Lespinasse, a new secret love interest.

=== Sex ===
This 49-minute episode covers the period from 1916 to the onset of World War II.

Photos taken by Jean Cocteau document the Montparnasse era of Picasso. He persuaded Picasso to do the art for his opera Parade (1917) which led to the latter's 1918 marriage to the Ballets Russes dancer Olga Khokhlova. This coterie (including Léonide Massine and Sergei Diaghilev) visited Naples and Pompeii, which instigated Picasso's "Neo-classical Period". Especially influential was a visit to the Naples National Archaeological Museum with its mosaics and the gigantic hands of the Farnese marbles. The great Maternity (1924), completed after the 1921 birth of Picasso's son Paolo, is an example.

The beach of the Plage la Garoupe at Cap d'Antibes became a favorite haunt of Picasso and his wealthy American friends Gerald and Sara Murphy. Another American plutocrat — Russell Greeley — owned the Château de Clavary at Auribeau-sur-Siagne, where the haut bohème gathered in the ‘20s. Picasso did a remarkable black-and-white floor mosaic there in 1924. Picasso’s facetiously named "Duchess period" was presided over by such aristocrats as Count Étienne de Beaumont and the Viscount and Viscountess Charles and Marie Laure de Noailles.

In 1925 Picasso fell out with Olga and in with the Surrealists. His new (and again secret) muse was Marie-Thérèse Walter, who was probably underage when they met. She is present in many of Picasso's erotic works (the "genital pun") depicting the beach at Dinard. The relationship finally came out in 1931 and ’32 after which Picasso’s images of Olga became quite cruel. These, and other female images, have recently raised issues of Picasso’s "Andalusian misogyny". He bought the Chateau de Boisgeloup not far from Paris, a hideaway where he created huge totemistic sculptures of Marie-Thérèse's head.

Despite Olga's rage and Marie-Thérèse's new baby, in 1936 Picasso embarked on a new affair with the photographer Dora Maar, whom he met at the café Les Deux Magots. His portraits of her gradually morphed from the sweet to the neurotic — The Weeping Woman, although her defenders still decry this characterization — as altercations ensued.

Picasso's great work for the Spanish Pavilion at the 1937 World's Fair — Guernica — was occasioned by the notorious Nazi bombing. For the pacifistic Picasso, it was painting "as an instrument of war". The two antagonistic mistresses appear in the work amidst a bull fight.

=== Death ===
This 49-minute episode covers the period from the war years to Picasso's death.

From 1937 Picasso maintained a Paris studio apartment at the Rue des Grands Augustins where he spent the war years — not being able to separate himself from his family circles and artworks — and depicted the war indirectly through vanitas still lifes and a series of paintings of flayed sheep heads. Forty years his junior, Francoise Gilot — an art fan and painter herself — now replaced the tormented Dora Maar in Picasso's life. (He completed a "disturbing" series of portraits of Dora at this time.)

In the years after liberation, Picasso and Francoise spent more and more time on the Cote d’Azur where he filled the Château Grimaldi with his art (notably La Joie de Vivre, 1946) and ultimately bequeathed it all to the City of Antibes. Sea imagery, including a sexual urchin motif, figures prominently in the painting of this period. A new son (Claude, 1947) and daughter (Paloma, 1949) soon followed. Naturally the tall, slender Francoise appears in the works of this period, often in a floral motif.

In 1948 the family moved to a secluded house ("La Gauloise", literally translated the "Gallic House") in Vallauris, near Cannes. Vallauris, long associated with a ceramics industry, had fallen on hard times and become kitschy—the "Sèvres of Schlock". Picasso restored its prestige by pursuing his own one man sculpture and art pottery industry at his studio — "La Fournas" — there. (Francoise appears frequently as a theme in the pottery.) The family adopted a self-consciously simple lifestyle and Picasso now became a Communist for his remaining years. In subsequent years, he advanced himself as an international "peace warrior" for Soviet propaganda and was once thwarted by the FBI in his attempt to include the United States in his travel itinerary.

Picasso so favored southern France partly because of the local bullfighting venues of Arles, Nîmes, and Fréjus. In his bullfight motif, both bull and fighter could represent himself while the picador’s horses were the women in his life. Two significant public works at Vallauris are presented: First, the bronze statue known as the Man with the Sheep ("which he regarded as perhaps his masterpiece", according to Richardson); second, two huge panels in a Romanesque chapel known as War and Peace (an artistic failure and a success, respectively, according to Richardson). The "overt piece of agitprop" called Massacre in Korea (1951) was his last effort at painting politically for the Communists.

Francoise walked out on him in 1953 and, among several girlfriends, he now selected Jacqueline Roque as her successor. He identified her with a figure in Delacroix’s The Women of Algiers and he gave her an orientalist cast in his works featuring her. Orientalism also featured in his immense new house at Cannes, the Villa de Californie ("La Californie"), of which he proved, for a change, very "house proud".

In his last major artistic phase, Picasso tried to "cannibalize" the works of his favorite "Old Masters’’, including Rembrandt, van Gogh and, most notably, Velázquez—he did 40 variations of Las Meninas. Picasso’s penultimate household was at Château of Vauvenargues (Richardson was among the first guests) which included a swath of the mountainside of Cézanne’s famous Montagne Sainte-Victoire.

In 1961 Picasso finally married Jacqueline and they made their last home at a house near (and also called) Notre-Dame-de-Vie at Mougins where he died (1973) and she later committed suicide (1986). Many of his last works, done in his 80s, feature "Love and Death": the onset of his impotence, and La Celestina, the famous syphilis-ridden Spanish procuress. Both he and later Jacqueline were buried at Vauvenargues, where bitterness had descended on Picasso's funeral: Jacqueline had banned his children from the premises.
