= Surviving Picasso =

1996 American film by James Ivory

- Theatrical release poster
- Directed by: James Ivory
- Screenplay by: Ruth Prawer Jhabvala
- Based on: Picasso: Creator and Destroyer by Arianna Stassinopoulos Huffington
- Produced by: Ismail Merchant; David L. Wolper
- Starring: Anthony Hopkins; Natascha McElhone; Julianne Moore; Joss Ackland; Peter Eyre; Jane Lapotaire; Joseph Maher; Bob Peck; Diane Venora; Joan Plowright
- Cinematography: Tony Pierce-Roberts
- Edited by: Andrew Marcus
- Music by: Richard Robbins
- Production companies: Merchant Ivory Productions; The Wolper Organization
- Distributed by: Warner Bros.
- Release date: September 20, 1996
- Running time: 125 minutes
- Country: United States
- Language: English
- Budget: $16 million
- Box office: $2 million

Surviving Picasso is a 1996 American biographical drama film directed by James Ivory and starring Anthony Hopkins as the famous painter Pablo Picasso. It was produced by Ismail Merchant and David L. Wolper. Ruth Prawer Jhabvala's screenplay was loosely based on the 1988 biography Picasso: Creator and Destroyer by Arianna Stassinopoulos Huffington.

== Plot ==
The young artist Françoise Gilot meets Picasso in Le Petit Benoit, a small bistro on the Left Bank, in Nazi-occupied Paris, and Picasso invites her and her friend to visit him at his home and studio at 7 Rue des Grands-Augustins. After doing so and flirting with Picasso she decides to become a painter against her father's wishes. Françoise is beaten by her father after telling him she wants to be a painter, rather than a lawyer. Picasso encourages her to paint, and a love affair develops between them. Eventually she moves in with him, even as Picasso is shown as often not caring about other people's feelings, firing his driver after a long period of service, and as a womanizer, saying that he can sleep with whomever he wants. Despite Picasso seducing other women, quarrelling with Françoise, and behaving selfishly, the couple have two children and move to the South of France near Cannes, but problems persist. In addition to Françoise, the film depicts several of the women who were important in Picasso's life, such as Olga Khokhlova, Dora Maar, Marie-Thérèse Walter, and Jacqueline Roque. The film ends when Françoise leaves Picasso over his coldness and his growing relationship with Jacqueline Roque, who moves in with Picasso and replaces her.

== Cast ==
- Anthony Hopkins as Pablo Picasso
- Natascha McElhone as Françoise Gilot
- Julianne Moore as Dora Maar
- Joss Ackland as Henri Matisse
- Dennis Boutsikaris as Kootz
- Peter Eyre as Jaime Sabartés
- Peter Gerety as Marcel
- Susannah Harker as Marie-Thérèse Walter
- Jane Lapotaire as Olga Khokhlova
- Joseph Maher as Daniel-Henry Kahnweiler
- Bob Peck as Françoise's Father
- Joan Plowright as Françoise's Grandmother
- Diane Venora as Jacqueline Roque
- Dominic West as Paulo Picasso
- Laura Aikman as Maya Widmaier-Picasso

== Production ==
=== Development ===
The film's ten-year genesis was protracted because Gilot declined to be involved. In Ivory's telling, "She told us she couldn't sell us the rights to her book because her children would be upset. Otherwise, she'd do everything she could to help. We only had to ask." Things then changed after Jhabvala had worked on the script: "Françoise, who had heard a rumour that Emma Thompson was going to play her in the film and that the script wasn't what she had envisaged, began to complain. To this day, we don't know why she changed her mind." Gilot withheld the rights to her autobiography Life with Picasso, and her son Claude, who administered the Picasso estate, refused permission to show or copy any of Picasso's artwork. Ivory commented, "It was all very disappointing after the initial friendliness, but by then we simply had to go ahead and make the film." Fake Picasso paintings had to be made, (Note: The Independent quoted Ivory as saying that the audience would not notice the difference; The Daily Telegraph stated that Ivory himself was among the counterfeiters. In a scene of Picasso working on Guernica, the camera is positioned overhead, making the canvas invisible.) and the source material used for the screenplay was Arianna Stassinopoulos's biography Picasso: Creator and Destroyer. McElhone felt that Gilot's involvement might have been counter-productive: "I would have tried to mimic all her gestures exactly."

Ivory told The Guardian that the budget had been $17 million; a Los Angeles Times article gave it as $17.2 million. In the Guardian interview, Ivory said that although Merchant-Ivory's budgets had increased since they began experiencing commercial success in the 1980s, "they are still less than half the cost of the average Hollywood film".

=== Filming ===
Location shooting took place in Paris and in the South of France; for the exterior shots of Picasso's studio, the filmmakers were able to use the actual location at rue des Grands Augustins, while the interior was recreated at Pinewood Studios. Merchant-Ivory shot the Parisian scenes while simultaneously shooting The Proprietor: the team recreated the occupation of Paris (for The Proprietor) and its liberation (for Surviving Picasso) in the Place de la Concorde on the same day.

After production had finished, Hopkins was publicly critical of Merchant-Ivory, with whom he had previously made Howards End and The Remains of the Day, telling The Los Angeles Times, "I was pretty angry at Ismail because they do spiteful things like not pay the crew. And they hold back money, to gain interest. They didn't pay me for a month... They'll take the stripes out of your socks. I'll keep my hand on my wallet next time." In response, Merchant acknowledged that one of Hopkins's payments had been held up, adding, "it is not easy to make an independent film... We have to run a tight ship... Everybody knows who we are and what we've done and how we work in films, so it's not something new as such. And each time he [Hopkins] has worked for us he has been treated like a king."

== Release ==
After it was completed, Warner Brothers picked the film up for distribution.

The film was to have had its world premiere at the Venice Film Festival, but at a late stage was withdrawn, with no official reason given. Françoise Gilot, who had opposed the film's making, declared herself delighted at this, telling the media, "The jury obviously thought what I thought, that the film script was not good." Ivory later stated that the filmmakers had had to decline an invitation from the festival because it would have clashed with a celebration of their career at Carnegie Hall, and that rumours to the contrary were "pettiness and misinformation".

It was released in Britain on Boxing Day 1996.

== Reception ==
=== Critical response ===
James Ivory paired the film with Jefferson in Paris, "which the critics fell upon with the greatest impatience and almost a kind of rage... these two films had the most dismissive reviews". On the review aggregator website Rotten Tomatoes, 32% of 19 critics' reviews are positive, with an average rating of 5.1/10. Metacritic, which uses a weighted average, assigned the film a score of 55 out of 100, based on 18 critics, indicating "mixed or average" reviews.

Variety called McElhone "stunning", and Hopkins "a full-blooded Picasso... Hopkins paints a complex portrait of the artist, letting us see why he inspires love and devotion as well as how he indulges his selfishness and egotism". It summed up: "This is a fine return to form for Merchant Ivory after the turgid 'Jefferson in Paris,' their previous biographical outing."

Kenneth Turan, reviewing for The Los Angeles Times, thought the film a disappointment ("a genteel, well-behaved, even conventional piece of filmmaking") as also Hopkins's acting ("his work here is more surface star turn than intensely felt performance"). He did however praise strongly "McElhone’s enormous flashing eyes and... presence that practically glows" and the film's recreation of its place and time.

In a highly positive review for The New York Times, Janet Maslin thought that not using Gilot's memoir or actual Picassos became an advantage: "Freed from the slavishness of most authorized biography, the film makers try bold strokes. They use a dazzling array of elegant, spare color accents that evoke the essence of the paintings if not the particulars." As well as the visuals, Maslin lauded McElhone's "uncommonly poised screen debut" and thought that Hopkins gave "his most vital performance since The Silence of the Lambs".

Peter Travers in Rolling Stone called the film "frustratingly one-sided", summing it up as "Portrait of the Artist as a Sexist Pig". He found Jhabvala's dialogue clumsy and that Françoise's decision to withstand Picasso's abuse for a decade played as unconvincing: "Why didn't Gilot split sooner? You never learn from Surviving Picasso, which lacks the courage to show the women in Picasso's life as conspirators in their own debasement."

Roger Ebert gave it 2.5 out of 4. He called Hopkins's Picasso "another great biographical interpretation by an actor of limitless resources... we can see the dazzling charm and effortless confidence–the certainty of greatness–that inspired new lovers to pursue him". At the same time, he identified two fundamental weaknesses: "The movie breaks down into anecdotes that don’t flow or build, and everything is narrated by the Gilot character. McElhone, who is electric and convincing when she’s onscreen, is a bad voice-over narrator, and... Jhabvala has not helped with language that seems formal and stilted, like a schoolgirl’s commentary for an educational film."

Rita Kempley in The Washington Post dismissed the film as "simplistic" and "turgid". She praised Hopkins's performance but not the film's others, and concluded: "The production is gorgeously mounted in the tradition of such Merchant/Ivory films as 'Howards End' and 'The Remains of the Day.' It's the wrong picture, but it is nicely framed."

In a review article for The Independent on artist biopics, David Thomson felt the film was substantially damaged by having to use Stassinopoulos's book instead of Gilot's ("a valuable piece of emotional journalism and the first revelation of Picasso as a celebrity monster"), and that the script and McElhone failed to evoke Gilot's essential strength.

In The Daily Telegraph, Quentin Curtis was scathing: "Surviving the film is the hard part." As well as being lukewarm about Hopkins's performance, he felt the movie "has nothing of substance to say. The disjunction between the genius of the subject and the novelettish, gossipy treatment is comic – and a little shocking." Citing as an issue how many of the cast were British character actors ("all seem more Kensington than Côte d'Azur"), he singled out by contrast Julianne Moore's performance as Dora Maar, "though she gets dangerously close to the borders of that alienating solipsism which has become Jennifer Jason Leigh country".

Reviewing for The Times, Geoff Brown found the emphasis on the artist's domestic life oppressive: "Hopkins's Picasso comes to seem plain nasty. Greater coverage of Picasso the artist would have placed his personality in context: as the film stands, we have little to shield us from the rampant egoism and misogyny. Hopkins's ebullient performance only rubs salt in the wounds. You want to escape this man's company." He praised the acting of Natascha McElhone, Peter Eyre and Julianne Moore, but concluded, "But for better or worse – worse, on balance – this is Picasso's show."

Derek Malcolm in The Guardian gave the film a strong review: "a fascinating treatise on what attracts women to powerful men, and how those men treat them". He rated highly not only Hopkins's performance but McElhone's ("one of the film's chief pleasures, suggesting both the coquettish charm that attracted Picasso and the independence of mind that enabled her to survive") and wrote that among the supporting cast, "Joss Ackland gives a brilliant cameo of Matisse, the only man who can look Picasso in the face as a peer."

In The Independent, Adam Mars-Jones described the film as "a welcome return after Jefferson in Paris, and... the least Merchant Ivory-ish film to be made by that team for many years. For once, they are recreating not order but turmoil".

Kevin Jackson in The Independent on Sunday called the film "mostly fancified soap opera, and not bad fun – though one blushes a little to admit it – provided you don't mind being left in the dark about everything that makes its subject worthy of a biopic". He felt that not only McElhone as Gilot but Hopkins lacked the necessary power: "His Picasso is an entertainer, a seducer, a clown... and alas, unlike the circus performers Picasso depicted, he's awfully cute."

Anne Billson in The Sunday Telegraph derided the male lead: "Hopkins is a magnificent Welsh ham and one can't help but be fond of him, but he's... at no stage remotely convincing as a hotblooded Hispanic genius with an insatiable appetite for life, art and tasty young totty." She also disparaged McElhone ("a pouting fashion plate whose last-minute conversion to self-sufficiency is betokened by a chic new haircut") and felt that the damaged women in Picasso's life were more watchable, though she called the fight between Dora Maar and Marie-Thérèse "a peculiarly Merchant Ivory sort of catfight, consisting of a bit of ladylike pushing and pulling".

George Perry in The Sunday Times praised Moore's performance and Luciana Arrighi's production design, and wrote that Hopkins "attacks his role with zest", but felt that the embargo imposed by the Picasso Trust meant "there is a void where Picasso's art should be". He summed up, "it seems a pity that a film dedicated to the most singular artistic genius of the 20th century must be confined to his priapic digressions".

=== Box office ===
In the United States and Canada, Surviving Picasso grossed $2 million at the box office, against a budget of $16 million.

== Bibliography ==
- Long, Robert Emmet (2005). James Ivory in Conversation: How Merchant Ivory Makes Its Movies. Berkeley, CA: University of California Press. ISBN 0-520-23415-4.
