= Picasso (disambiguation) =

Pablo Picasso (1881–1973) was a Spanish painter and sculptor.

Picasso may also refer to:

== People with the surname Picasso ==
- Ana María Picasso (born 1984), Peruvian journalist and TV host
- Bernard Ruiz-Picasso (born 1959), Belgian businessman and art collector
- Claude Picasso (1947–2023), French cinematographer and businessman
- Diana Widmaier Picasso (born 1974), French art historian
- Florian Picasso (born 1990), French DJ and great-grandson of the artist, Pablo Picasso
- Francisco Picasso (born 1982), Uruguayan professional medley swimmer
- Lamberto Picasso (1880–1962), Italian film actor
- Marie Picasso (born 1979), Swedish singer, host and model
- Marina Picasso (born 1950), French humanitarian
- Maya Widmaier-Picasso (1935–2022), French art expert
- Paloma Picasso (born 1949), fashion designer and businesswoman, daughter of Pablo Picasso and Françoise Gilot
- Renzo Picasso (1880–1975), Italian architect, engineer, and urban planner and designer

== People with the first name Picasso ==
- Picasso Nelson (born 1973), American football player

== People with nickname Picasso ==
- Picasso (footballer) (born 1939), Brazilian footballer

== Places ==
- Torre Picasso (Picasso Tower), a 43-story skyscraper in Madrid, Spain
- Musée Picasso (Picasso museum), a mansion in Paris, France that contains over 3000 works of art by Pablo Picasso
- Museu Picasso (Picasso museum), in Barcelona, Spain which contains over 3500 works of art by Pablo Picasso
- Museo Picasso, in Málaga, Spain
- Bobigny–Pablo Picasso station, a Paris Metro station, and eastern terminus of line 5
- Picasso (crater), a crater on Mercury
- Picasso (restaurant), in Las Vegas

== In technology ==
- The PICASSO (dark matter) physics experiment, the Project in Canada to Search for Supersymmetric Objects
- Picasso 96, a product line of graphics cards for the Amiga computer family
- AMD Picasso, codename for AMD's line of Ryzen APUs using the Zen+ CPU architecture and the Vega GPU architecture
- Citroën Picasso (disambiguation), a series of compact MPV models produced by the French automaker Citroën
- Picasso was a moniker for the SNCF Class X 3800 diesel railcars

== In arts and entertainment ==
- Picasso, the second season of the American television series, Genius, broadcast by the National Geographic channel
- Picasso (band), a Japanese rock band, most known for several theme songs for the anime television series Maison Ikkoku
- "Pablo Picasso" (song), written by Jonathan Richman for the group The Modern Lovers
- "Pablo Picasso", a song on the album The Clarence Greenwood Recordings by Citizen Cope
- Picasso, a character, played by Kendal Nagorcka, on the children's show The Shak
- Pikasso guitar, a custom-made guitar (42 strings, three necks) played from Pat Metheny
- Picasso (album), an album by the David Murray Octet
- Picasso (play), a 2003 play by Jeffrey Hatcher
- Picasso (film), a 2019 Marathi language film

== Other uses ==
- Picasso triggerfish, a triggerfish found in the reefs of the Indo-Pacific region
- Picasso bug, a species of Hemipteran found in Africa

== See also ==
- Picasa, a computer image editing program
- Pigcasso (2016–2024), a South African painting pig named after Pablo Picasso
- Pikahsso (born 1970), American hip hop artist
