= Bust of a Seated Woman (Jacqueline Roque) =

1960 oil painting by Pablo Picasso

- Buste de femme assise (Jacqueline Roque) (French)
- Artist: Pablo Picasso
- Year: 1960
- Medium: oil paint on canvas
- Movement: Portrait painting
- Subject: Jacqueline Roque
- Dimensions: 100 cm × 81 cm (39 in × 32 in)
- Location: Unterlinden Museum; Colmar
- Accession: 1967

Bust of a Seated Woman (Jacqueline Roque) is an oil painting by the Spanish artist Pablo Picasso, painted between 2 April and 10 May 1960. It depicts Jacqueline Roque, a woman with whom he had started a relationship in 1954, after his break up with Françoise Gilot, and who he would marry in 1961. The painting belongs to the Unterlinden Museum in Colmar, Alsace, since 1967, when it was bought by the museum following a successful Picasso exhibition there. Its inventory number is 88.RP.400.

== Description ==
The painting depicts Jacqueline (then in her early 30s, as she was born in 1926) sitting in a green armchair. Her neck is elongated in almost grotesque fashion, so as to raise the petite woman's head well above her seat. Jacqueline's face is depicted both frontally and laterally: the right side of her face (i.e. the left side, as seen by the viewer) is also her right profile, which is why her nose is so prominent, and why only one half of her mouth is visible. Picasso also emphasizes Jacqueline's lush hair and her ample bosom, as an homage to the voluptuous Mediterranean type of female beauty which had already been celebrated by Eugène Delacroix.
