= Dorothy Kosinski =

American art historian

Dorothy M. Kosinski is an American scholar of nineteenth and twentieth-century art, curator and the former director (2008--2023) of The Phillips Collection, an art museum in Washington, D. C.

== Biography ==
Kosinski was born in Meriden, Connecticut, into a Catholic family and grew up in Wallingford, Connecticut, and got her BA from Yale University and her MA and PhD degrees from the New York University Institute of Fine Arts. After being an intern and curatorial assistant at the Guggenheim Museum, she became a curator for the Bruce Museum in Greenwich, Connecticut, and, from 1985 to 1997, for the private collection of cubist art left by Douglas Cooper in Basel, Switzerland. From 1995 to 2008, she worked at the Dallas Museum of Art, where she worked in different capacities before she eventually became senior curator of painting and sculpture, then was appointed director at The Phillips Collection, where she succeed Jay Gates. She was also an independent curator for the National Gallery in Prague, the Kunstmuseum Wolfsburg, the Kunstmuseum Basel, and the Royal Academy of Arts. Her experience amounts to over 30 exhibitions.

Kosinski has published on artists including Gustave Courbet, Henri Matisse, and Vincent van Gogh and on various topics in nineteenth and twentieth-century art. Her book "Matisse: Painter as Sculptor" was among "The best books of 2007" listed by the Financial Times. In total, Kosinski can look back on over 35 publications. As an expert of nineteenth and twentieth-century art Kosinski has been quoted by the New York Times and the Washington Post.

President Obama appointed her in 2012 to the National Council on the Humanities, an advisory council to the National Endowment for the Humanities. In December 2017 Kosinski was awarded the Order of the Star of Italy for her "outstanding contributions to the arts and promotion of Italian culture".

She is a member of the US-China Forum on the Arts and Culture. She is also director of the Morris & Gwendolyn Cafritz Foundation and of the Sherman Fairchild Foundation, as well as a member of the Association of Art Museum Directors.

Kosinski is married to the Swiss-born architect Thomas Krahenbuhl. They have one daughter.

== Publications ==
- 1987: Douglas Cooper Und Die Meister Des Kubismus and the Masters of Cubism, Univ of Washington Pr, ISBN 9783720400527
- 1990: Picasso, Braque, Gris, Leger: Douglas Cooper Collecting Cubism, Museum of Fine Arts Houston, ISBN 9780890900499
- 1994: Fernand Leger 1911-1924: The Rhythm of Modern Life (Art & Design), Prestel Pub, ISBN 9783791313726
- 1999: The Artist and the Camera, Yale University Press, ISBN 9780300081688
- 2001: Henry Moore, Yale University Press, ISBN 9780300089929
- 2005: Dialogues, Yale University Press, ISBN 9780300109269
- 2006: Van Gogh's Sheaves of Wheat, Yale University Press, ISBN 9780300117721
- 2007: Matisse, Yale University Press, ISBN 9780300115413
- 2012: Per Kirkeby, Yale University Press, ISBN 9780300181227
- 2013: Angels, Demons, and Savages, Yale University Press, ISBN 9780300186482
- 2013: Giorgio de Chirico: Myth and Archaeology, Silvana Editorale, ISBN 9788836626274
- 2013: Impressionism and Post-Impressionism at the Dallas Museum of Art: The Richard R. Brettell Lecture Series, Dallas Museum of Art, ISBN 9780300187571
- 2015: Gauguin to Picasso, Masterworks from Switzerland: The Staechelin & Im Obersteg Collections, GILES, ISBN 9781907804601
- 2017: Markus Lüpertz, Sieveking, ISBN 9783944874593
- 2020: Riffs and Relations: African American Artists and the European Modernist Tradition, Rizzoli Electa, ISBN 9780847866649
