= John Richardson (art historian) =

American art historian (1924–2019)

Sir John Patrick Richardson KBE, FBA
- Born: John Patrick Richardson; 6 February 1924; London, England
- Died: 12 March 2019 (aged 95); New York City, New York, U.S.
- Education: Slade School of Fine Art
- Occupations: Art historian, designer

Sir John Patrick Richardson, KBE, FBA (6 February 1924 – 12 March 2019) was a British art historian and biographer of Pablo Picasso. Richardson also worked as an industrial designer and as a reviewer for The New Observer.

In 1952, he moved to Provence, where he became friends with Picasso, Fernand Léger and Nicolas de Staël. In 1960, he moved to New York and organized a nine-gallery Picasso retrospective. Christie's then appointed him to open their U.S. office, which he ran for the next nine years. In 1973, he joined New York gallery M. Knoedler & Co., Inc., as vice president in charge of 19th- and 20th-century painting, and later became managing director of Artemis, a mutual fund specializing in works of art.

In 1980, he started devoting all his time to writing and working on his Picasso biography. He was also a contributor to The New Yorker and Vanity Fair.

In 1993, Richardson was elected to the British Academy and in 1995 he was appointed Slade Professor of Fine Art at the University of Oxford. He was awarded France's Ordre des Arts et des Lettres in 2011 and in 2012 was appointed Knight Commander of the Order of the British Empire.

== Biography ==
=== Youth and education ===
John Patrick Richardson was born on 6 February 1924 in London, England, the elder son of Sir Wodehouse Richardson, Quarter-Master General in the Boer War, and founder of the Army & Navy Stores. His mother was Patty (née Crocker); he had a younger sister (b. 1925) and a younger brother. In 1929, when he was five years old, his father died, and his mother sent him to board at two successive preparatory schools, where he was unhappy. When he was thirteen, he became a boarder at Stowe School, where he admired the architecture and landscape and was taught something about the work of Picasso and other innovative painters.

By 1939, and the outbreak of World War II, Richardson knew that he wanted to become an artist, and, a month short of seventeen, enrolled at the Slade School of Fine Art (at that time evacuated to Oxford), where he became a friend of Geoffrey Bennison and James Bailey. When he was called up for military service, he obtained a position in the Irish Guards, but almost immediately contracted rheumatic fever and was invalided out of the army. During this period he met and made friends with Francis Bacon and Lucian Freud, both of whom later painted portraits of him. He spent the rest of the war with his mother and siblings in London. During daytime, he worked as an industrial designer before becoming a reviewer for The New Observerp. In 1949 he became acquainted with art historian and collector Douglas Cooper, with whom he would share his life for the next ten years.

=== Liaison with Douglas Cooper ===
Richardson moved to Provence in the south of France in 1952, when Douglas Cooper acquired the Château de Castille in the vicinity of Avignon and transformed the run-down castle into a private museum of early Cubism. Cooper had been at home in the Paris art scene before World War II and had been active in the art business as well; by building his own collection, he also met many artists personally and introduced them to his friend. Richardson became a close friend of Picasso, Léger and de Staël as well. During this period of his life he developed an interest in Picasso's portraits and contemplated creating a publication; more than 20 years later, these plans expanded into his four-part Picasso biography A Life of Picasso, the final volume of which was published in 2022.

=== New York ===
In 1960, Richardson left Cooper and moved to New York City, where he organized a nine-gallery Picasso retrospective in 1962 and a Braque retrospective in 1964. Christie's, the auction house, then appointed him to open their US office, which he ran for the next nine years. In 1973, he joined New York gallery M. Knoedler & Co., Inc., as Vice President in charge of 19th- and 20th-century painting, and later became Managing Director of Artemis, a mutual fund specializing in works of art.

In 1980, Richardson decided to devote all his time to writing. Besides working on his Picasso biography, he was a contributor to The New York Review of Books, The New Yorker and Vanity Fair. In 1993, Richardson was elected to the British Academy and in 1995 he was appointed Slade Professor of Art at the University of Oxford.

=== Picasso biography ===
The first of four planned volumes of Richardson's A Life of Picasso biography, (originally planned to be published in one single volume), was published in 1991. This described 25 years from his birth to 1906 and won a Whitbread Award. The second volume was published in November 1996, dealing with the period 1907–1916, and thus covering the birth of Cubism, followed by the third volume in 2007, devoted to the period up to 1932, when Picasso turned 50. The fourth volume was originally to span the early 1930s to the liberation of Paris in 1944. Though the fourth volume fell behind schedule (it was to be published by Alfred A. Knopf in 2014), Richardson spoke of still progressing with it in a February 2016 interview with Alain Elkann. Richardson stated then that he was working daily, "even weekends", on the project with three assistants who were aiding him with writing and research. He stated that he was "up to 1939", and that he hoped to "get through the war". The fourth volume, covering Picasso's life until 1943 was eventually published posthumously in November 2021.

Fifteen years after Cooper's death, Richardson published a memoir (The Sorcerer's Apprentice. Picasso, Provence, and Douglas Cooper) in 1999 and a collection of essays in 2001 (Sacred Monsters, Sacred Masters). He was curator of an exhibition of the late Picasso with title Mosqueteros in the Gagosian Gallery in New York City. For the London Gagosian Gallery, he curated another such exhibition in 2010: Picasso - The Mediterranean Years (1945-1962), which ran from 4 June until 28 August 2010. In 2011, Richardson and Diana Widmaier Picasso co-curated another sizable Picasso exhibition, "Picasso and Marie-Thérèse: L'amour fou", at the Gagosian gallery in New York City for which Richardson also wrote a related book.

Also in 2011, Richardson was awarded France's Ordre des Arts et des Lettres in recognition of his contributions to furthering the arts in France and throughout the world.

Richardson was appointed Knight Commander of the Order of the British Empire (KBE) in the 2012 New Year Honours for services to art.

=== Death ===
Richardson died in New York City on 12 March 2019, at the age of 95.

== Bibliography ==
=== Books ===
- Picasso, Pablo: Aquarelle und Gouachen, Berlin: Dt. Buch-Gemeinschaft, 1956
- Manet, Edouard: Gemälde und Zeichnungen, Köln: Phaidon Verlag, 1959
- Picasso, Pablo (1964). Watercolors and gouaches. Text by John Richardson. London: Barrie and Rockliff.
- Juan Gris, Museum am Ostwall, Dortmund 1965
- Dorothy M. Kosinski, John Richardson, Öffentliche Kunstsammlung Basel: Douglas Cooper und die Meister des Kubismus, Kunstmuseum Basel, Basel, 1987, ISBN 978-3-7204-0052-7
- A Life of Picasso (1991 - 2021):
  - The Prodigy, 1881-1906 (Vol. 1), New York: Random House, 1991, ISBN 978-0-375-71149-7 (German edition: Kindler, München, 1991)
  - The Cubist Rebel, 1907–1916 (Vol. 2). Random House, New York 1996, ISBN 978-0-375-71150-3 (German edition: Kindler, 1997)
  - The Triumphant Years, 1917–1932 (Vol 3), New York: Alfred A. Knopf, 2007, ISBN 978-0-307-26665-1
  - The Minotaur Years, 1933–1943 (Vol. 4), New York: Alfred A. Knopf, 2021, ISBN 978-0-307-26666-8
- The Sorcerer's Apprentice: Picasso, Provence, and Douglas Cooper, London: Jonathan Cape, 1999, ISBN 978-0-224-05056-2
- Sacred Monsters, Sacred Masters: Beaton, Capote, Dalí, Picasso, Freud, Warhol, and More, New York: Random House, 2001, ISBN 978-0-679-42490-1
- (with Brenda Richardson) Warhol from the Sonnabend Collection (Rizzoli, 2009)
- (with others) Picasso Mosqueteros: The Late Works 1962–1972 (2009)
- (with others) Picasso & the Camera, ISBN 978-0847845910 (Gagosian Gallery, New York, 2014)

=== Essays and reporting ===
- "Bacon Agonistes", New York Review of Books, 17 December 2009.
- "Cubism steals the show", Vanity Fair v. 634, p. 84-85 (June 2013).

== Filmography ==
- Picasso: Magic, Sex & Death (2001), writer and presenter
