= Maya Widmaier-Picasso =

Daughter of Pablo Picasso and Marie-Thérèse Walter (1935–2022)

- Born: María de la Concepción; 5 September 1935; Boulogne-Billancourt, France
- Died: 20 December 2022 (aged 87); Neuilly-sur-Seine, France
- Other name: Maya Ruiz-Picasso
- Spouse: Pierre Widmaier (m. 1960)
- Children: 3
- Parents: Pablo Picasso (father); Marie-Thérèse Walter (mother)

María de la Concepción "Maya" Widmaier-Picasso (5 September 1935 – 20 December 2022), later known as Maya Ruiz-Picasso, was the eldest daughter of Spanish painter Pablo Picasso and Marie-Thérèse Walter. She devoted part of her life to the study and preservation of the legacy of her father.

== Biography ==
Born on 5 September 1935, in Boulogne-Billancourt, France, she was named María de la Concepción after her father's sister Concepción, who had died in childhood. She came to be known as "Maya" due to her own pronunciation of "María" as a child. She was the second of her father's four children. She had one older half-brother, Paulo (1921–1975) (the father of Bernard Ruiz-Picasso and Marina Picasso), from her father's marriage to ballet dancer Olga Khokhlova, and two younger half-siblings, Claude (1947–2023) and Paloma (born in 1949), from her father's relationship with painter Françoise Gilot.

According to his biographer John Richardson, Picasso registered her birth to state that the father was unknown, due to the restrictions of French law that dictated that a married man was not allowed to register as the father of another woman's child. At her baptism in 1942, he declared that he was her godfather.

At the time of her birth, her father Picasso was still married to Olga Khokhlova, with whom he had one son named Paulo. Her mother Marie-Thérèse Walter had been in a relationship with Picasso since January 1927. By the summer of 1936, he had secretly moved on to a new relationship with the surrealist photographer Dora Maar.

In the autumn of 1936, Walter and Maya went to stay at a house at Tremblay-sur-Mauldre, where Picasso visited them on weekends. They lived there until the beginning of World War II. Walter and Maya then stayed in Royan from September 1939 but returned to Paris in the spring of 1941 to live in a flat at 1, Boulevard Henri-IV on Île Saint-Louis. Picasso hand-created a series of study books to teach his daughter to draw when she was five, perhaps to watch her making art in order to imitate her process in making his own art. After the liberation of Paris in August 1944, Walter and Picasso's relationship came to an end and Maya only saw Picasso while on holiday on the Côte d’Azur, at Vallauris, Antibes and Cannes. This was due to Picasso moving to the South of France with Françoise Gilot. Gilot later commented that Maya was brought up believing "the fiction that her father worked a long way away". After the end of World War II, Picasso finally told Maya about the existence of Paulo, when she was ten years old.

At the age of 18, she went to live in Spain to study at Lycée Français in Madrid. She then moved to Barcelona, where she helped a cousin design orthopaedic corsets. At the age of 20 she returned to Paris and worked at a feminist magazine and then took the position of personal assistant to Josephine Baker.

In the summer of 1955, she spent time with Picasso assisting him in the making of Henri-Georges Clouzot's film Le Mystère Picasso in the Victorine Studios in Nice.

In 1960, she married Pierre Widmaier and had three children: Olivier, Richard, and Diana.

After the death of her father in 1973, Widmaier-Picasso and his other children sued to be recognised as his heirs. She acquired part of his estate, following an agreement between the heirs, which had been a difficult process due to the fact that Picasso had not left a will. She also began to use the name Ruiz-Picasso, Ruiz being the paternal surname of Picasso's father José Ruiz y Blasco.

She gained a reputation as an authority on his works and was sometimes called upon by the auction houses Sotheby’s and Christie’s to assist with authentication. During the following years she donated and loaned several of his artworks. For her work in preserving her father's legacy, she was appointed Knight of the Legion of Honor in 2007 and Commander of the Order of Arts and Letters in 2016.

In 2015, she launched the Maya Picasso Foundation for Arts Education, to reopen the building housing Picasso's studio at Hôtel de Savoie on 7 rue des Grands Augustins in Paris and develop activities relating to his life and work.

Widmaier-Picasso died of pulmonary complications on 20 December 2022, at the age of 87.

== Portraits by Picasso ==
Widmaier-Picasso repeatedly posed for portraits painted by her father when she was between the ages of seven and 18. She is depicted as a toddler in a 1938 portrait titled First Snow. She recalled, "It was the day that I took my first steps… I was wearing little pink booties that my father kept his whole life."

During the same period that he completed his monumental 1937 artwork Guernica, Picasso produced a number of portraits of his daughter, including Maya with Doll and Maya in a Sailor Suit, both painted in 1938. He is known to have created 14 portraits of her between 1938 and 1939.

In 2017, the Gagosian Gallery presented in Paris the exhibition Picasso and Maya: Father and Daughter, curated by Diana Widmaier Picasso. It was the first exhibition devoted to Picasso's portraits of his eldest daughter.
