= Marina Picasso =

French humanitarian and granddaughter of Pablo Picasso

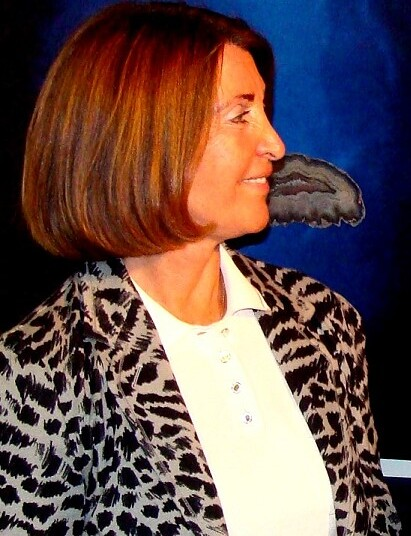
- Marina in 2011
- Born: 14 November 1950 (age 75)
- Other name: Marina Ruiz Picasso
- Occupation: Humanitarian
- Known for: Founder of the Marina Picasso Foundation; selling her Picasso inheritance to fund children's charities
- Notable work: Founded an orphanage in Thu Duc, Vietnam
- Relatives: Paulo Picasso (father); Émilienne Lotte (mother); Bernard Ruiz-Picasso (half-brother); Pablo Picasso (grandfather); Olga Khokhlova (grandmother); Maya Widmaier-Picasso (aunt); Claude Picasso (uncle); Paloma Picasso (aunt)

Marina Picasso (born 14 November 1950) is a French humanitarian and the granddaughter of Pablo Picasso. She inherited a fifth of her grandfather's estate and has used much of the inheritance to fund humanitarian efforts for children in need. She has five children and resides in Geneva, Switzerland and Cannes, France.

== Early life ==
Marina was born on 14 November 1950 to Paulo and Emiliénne Picasso (maiden name Emiliénne Lotte). Paulo was the son of a Russian ballerina Olga Khokhlova and artist Pablo Picasso. Her brother Pablito was born a year earlier on May 5, 1949.

Marina's father Paulo worked odd jobs for Pablo Picasso (such as a chauffeur) and did not spend a lot of time with his immediate family. Marina's parents divorced in 1953, three years after she was born. Paulo remarried to Christine Pauplin and they had a son, Bernard Ruiz-Picasso.

Emiliénne did not work and "relied on handouts from her ex-husband to raise Marina and her older brother, Pablito." Paulo did not work regularly, so Marina and her brother grew up struggling both emotionally and financially despite their grandfather's proximity and enormous wealth. In her autobiography Marina stated that both parents abused alcohol. In 1957, Pablo Picasso sued unsuccessfully for custody of Marina and Pablito on the grounds that their environment was “degrading to their health and morality.” He did not succeed, although the court did mandate regular visits by a social worker. Picasso became more involved in their lives by paying for their private schooling. However, via his lawyer, he paid only the school fees so the children struggled to obtain books and stationery and "could afford neither school trips nor proper clothes." Visits to Picasso's home in early childhood were infrequent, but memorable as part of 'la bande' (the gang) of close in age young family members. Picasso enjoyed taking the extended family to bullfights.

Marina wanted to go to college and medical school but could not pay for it and did not dare request support from her grandfather based on his lawyer's advice. Instead, she supported herself by working in a home for children with mental health issues and learning disabilities.

== Picasso's death and inheritance ==
Pablo Picasso died in Mougins, France on April 8, 1973. Picasso's second wife Jacqueline did not allow Picasso's children or grandchildren including Marina's brother Pablito to attend the funeral. A few days later, he drank a bottle of bleach. As a result, Pablito suffered from internal injuries for three months before dying on July 2, 1973.

Despite the wealth Pablo Picasso left behind, the immediate family could not afford Pablito's funeral, so the burial expenses were paid for with donations from friends.

Picasso did not leave a will, which initiated contention amongst family members and their representatives (widow Jacqueline and children Claude, Maya, Paloma and grandchildren Marina and Bernard). After a judge sorted out the details of the inheritance, Marina Picasso inherited over 10,000 pieces of art and Picasso's Cannes residence, Villa La Californie.

== Humanitarian work ==
Marina has slowly worked to sell her vast Picasso collection to pay for her charitable causes. Until his death in 2008, she worked with gallery representative Jan Krugier. When Krugier died, she tried to sell through Sotheby's but wasn't happy with the results. Since 2013, Marina has been selling privately. She said, "...helping to look after orphaned children or suffering adolescents and surrounding them with affection has been a constant aim of my life."

In 1990, through her charitable company, the Marina Picasso Foundation, she founded an orphanage in a former military base in Thu Duc, Vietnam. The orphanage was called "The Village of Youth." Marina's foundation also funded well digging in Vietnam, sent food to orphanages, purchased medical equipment for hospitals and gave out farming subsidies and scholarships. She has donated to various charities in countries around the world, including Vietnam, Switzerland, France, and various African countries.

== Personal life ==
Marina Picasso has five children: Gael, Flore, Dimitri, Florian, and May. Dimitri, Florian, and May were adopted from Vietnam. Marina's adopted son Florian Picasso is a DJ and music producer. Marina has never been married.

== Published work ==
- Picasso, Marina. (1995). Les enfants du bout du monde. Paris: Ramsay.
- Picasso, Marina, & Valentin, L. (2001). Picasso, My Grandfather. New York, NY: Riverhead Books.
