= Bernard Ruiz-Picasso =

Belgian businessman (born 1959)

- Born: 3 September 1959 (age 66); Neuilly-sur-Seine, France
- Citizenship: Belgium
- Occupations: Businessman, art collector
- Spouse: Almine Rech (m. 1997)
- Relatives: Marina Picasso (half-sister); Pablo Picasso (grandfather); Olga Khokhlova (grandmother); Maya Widmaier-Picasso (aunt); Claude Picasso (uncle); Paloma Picasso (aunt)

Bernard Ruiz-Picasso (born 3 September 1959) is a businessman and art collector. He is the grandson of Pablo Picasso and the son of Paul and Christine Ruiz-Picasso. He curates international exhibitions dedicated to Pablo Picasso.

== Biography ==
Bernard Ruiz-Picasso is the son of Paul Joseph Ruiz-Picasso/Paulo Picasso, the first child of Pablo Picasso and his wife Olga Khokhlova, and is therefore the only "legitimate heir" of his grandfather's works, according to the legal system in place before 2002, together with his half-sister Marina Picasso. As such he is considered to be the person with the most important collection of Picasso's works. He organised his first exhibition, presenting seventy paintings from his collections, in 2000 at the Kunstforum in Vienna, Austria.

=== Personal life ===
He is married to the art dealer and gallery owner Almine Rech, with whom he founded in 2002 the Fundación Almine y Bernard Ruiz-Picasso para el Arte, which promotes contemporary art.

He lives in Monaco. With his wife, he has developed a collection of contemporary art.

== Fundación Almine y Bernard Ruiz-Picasso para el Arte ==
The Fundación Almine y Bernard Ruiz-Picasso para el Arte (FABA) is a foundation incorporated under Spanish law, created in 2002, and is made up by a collection of works by Pablo Picasso and contemporary artists. Bernard Ruiz-Picasso is co-president of FABA.

FABA preserves a collection of works by Picasso and contemporary artists. The foundation supports creation through exhibitions, and promotes the understanding and study of Picasso's works.

Château de Boisgeloup, which Ruiz-Picasso inherited in 1975, was opened to the public in 2012 to show Picasso's studio and a series of contemporary art exhibitions starting with Un Soir à Boisgeloup.

== Museo Picasso Málaga ==
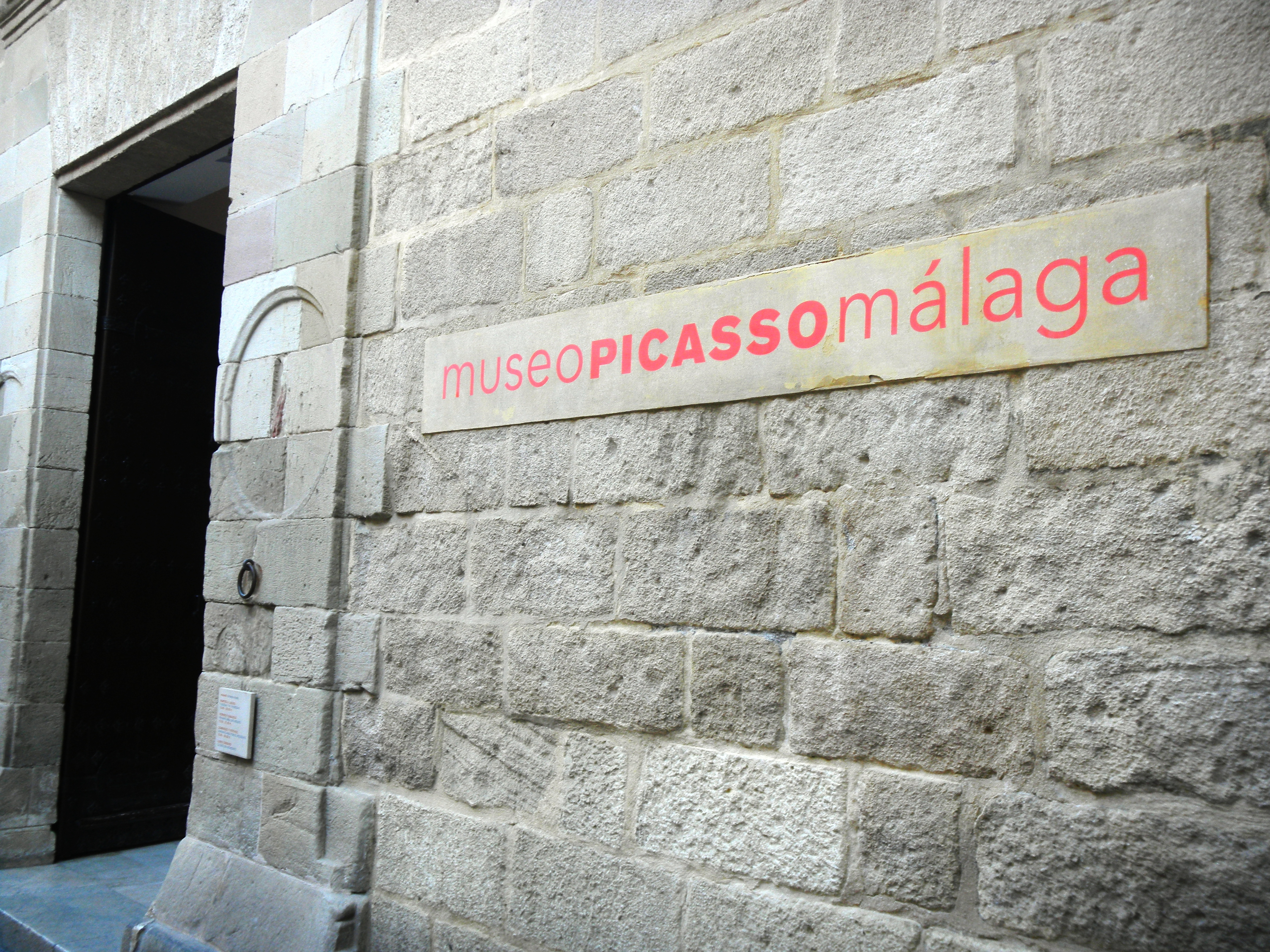
Entrance of the Museum in Malaga

Bernard Ruiz-Picasso, together with his mother Christine Ruiz-Picasso co-founded the Picasso Museum in Málaga which opened in 2003. He is President of the Advisory Council of the museum. On that occasion, Bernard Ruiz-Picasso donated 180 works to establish the museum's collection. He regularly lends other works from his collection to the Picasso Museum in Málaga.

The Museum is governed by the Fundación Museo Picasso Málaga. The foundation is an entity that has full control over the collection and holdings of the museum. It owns the Palacio de Buenavista, the headquarters of the institution.

The Fundación Museo Picasso Málaga aims to ensure the preservation, exhibition, study and dissemination of the work of Pablo Picasso. It conceives the Picasso Museum of Malaga as a centre of projection and, cultural and social impulse, where visitors come not only to enjoy the legacy of Pablo Picasso, but also to be part of didactic activities and to benefit from cultural facilities.

== Exhibitions ==
Bernard Ruiz-Picasso organised an exhibition with the Kunstforum in Vienna and the Kunsthalle in Tübingen (Germany) which hosted the exhibition in January 2002. For the first time, an important part of his collection was exhibited : 70 paintings painted between 1899 and 1972, along with some thirty drawings from the Cubist period.

In 2017, Bernard Ruiz-Picasso was co-curator of an exhibition devoted to Olga, Picasso's first wife, at the Musée Picasso in Paris. The same year, he lent 166 works to the Picasso Museum in Malaga for a three-year temporary exhibition entitled "Pablo Picasso, New Collection ".

Several exhibitions are organised in cooperation with the Fundación Almine y Bernard Ruiz-Picasso para el Arte: in 2019 the exhibition "Calder-Picasso" at the Picasso Museum in Paris, in 2020 the exhibition "Les Musiques de Picasso" at the Cité de la Musique in Paris.

== Curator ==
- Cerámicas de Picasso, Museo Picasso Málaga, Málaga, 2004
- Picasso Antología 1895-1971, Museao Picasso Málaga, Málaga, 2004
- Olga Picasso 1917-1935, Musée Picasso, Paris, 2017
- Minotaurs and Matadors, galerie Gagosian, London, 2017
- Picasso et Khokhlova, Pushkin Museum, Moscow, 2018
- Calder et Picasso, Musée Picasso, Paris, 2019

== Works ==
- Parfum de Sable, recueil de poèmes, éditions de la Fenêtre, 1995
- Miquel Barceló : Farrutx 29.III.94, en collaboration avec Miquel Barceló, éditions Images Modernes, Paris, 1999 (ISBN 2-913355-02-1)
