= Paulo Picasso =

Eldest son of and model for Pablo Picasso

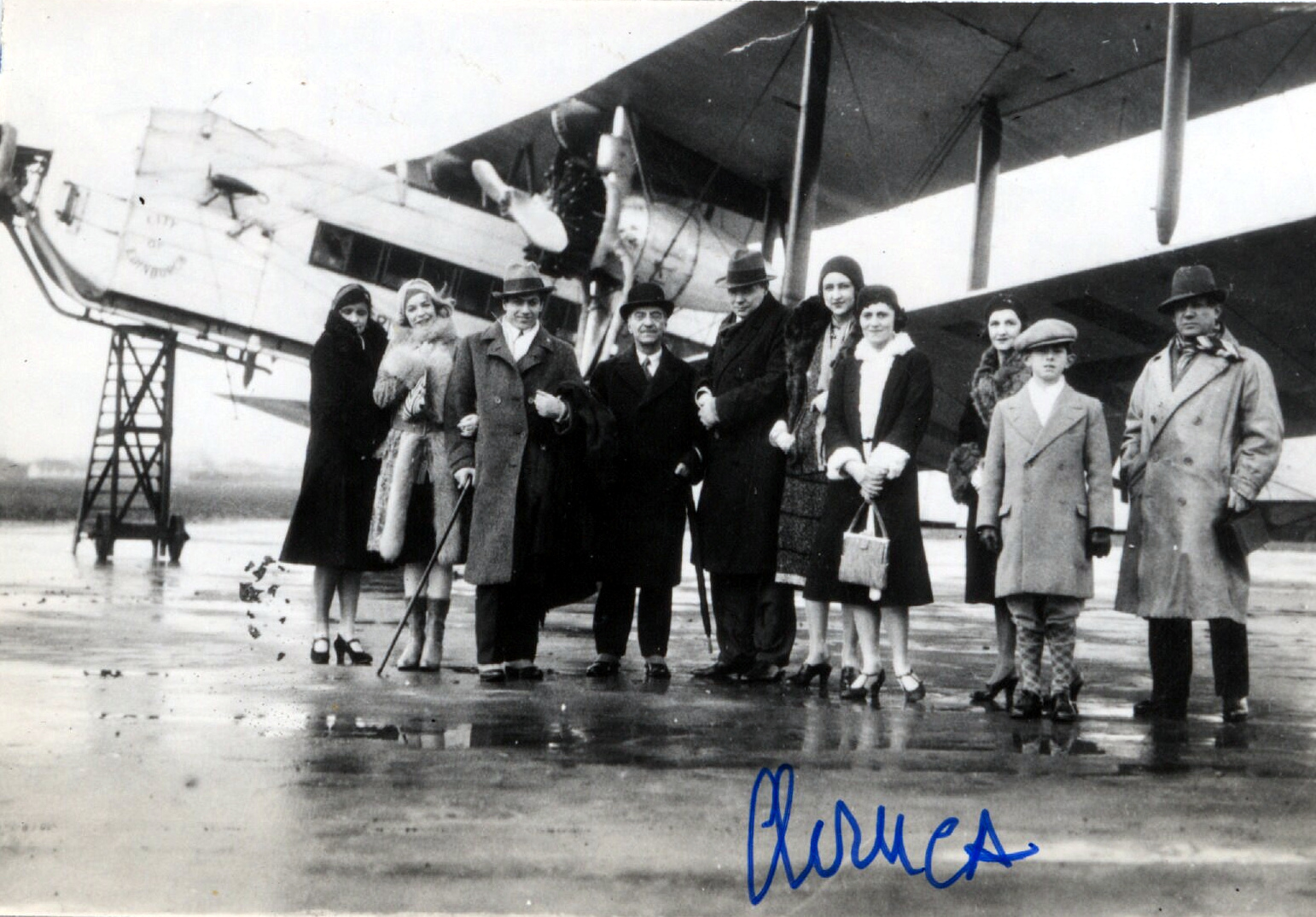
- Photo of Picasso's family near an aircraft, with members of the Ballets Russes company, c. 1930. From left to right: Ludmilla Schollar, Alice Nikitina, Serge Lifar, Walter Nouvel, Serge Grigoriev, Lubov Tchernicheva, Mme. Trusevich, Picasso's wife Olga Khokhlova, Picasso's son Paulo Picasso, Pablo Picasso
- Born: 4 February 1921; Paris, France
- Died: 5 June 1975 (aged 54); Paris
- Other name: Paulo
- Parents: Pablo Picasso (father); Olga Khokhlova (mother)

Paul Joseph Ruiz Picasso (known as Paulo, 4 February 1921 – 5 June 1975) was the eldest son of the Spanish painter and sculptor Pablo Picasso and the Russian ballet dancer Olga Khokhlova. As a child, he was the model for several of his father's works. As an adult, he was his father's chauffeur.

== Biography ==
=== Family ===
Paulo Picasso (also known as Paul Picasso) was born in Paris on 4 February 1921. He was the son of the Spanish painter and sculptor Pablo Picasso (1881–1973), who lived in France, and his first wife, the Russian ballet dancer Olga Khokhlova (1891–1955). They had married in 1918 at the Alexander Nevsky Cathedral, Paris. The couple's only child, Paulo was also the only child recognised as legitimate during Pablo Picasso's lifetime. Nevertheless, he was the eldest of four siblings, being the half-brother of Maya Ruiz-Picasso (1935–2022), Claude Picasso (1947–2023), and Paloma Picasso (b. 1949), who were born out of wedlock and were only legitimised after Pablo Picasso's death.

=== Childhood: a source of inspiration and model for his father ===
From his earliest childhood, Paulo Picasso was the subject of numerous drawings, and later oil paintings, by his father.

In the early 1920s, coinciding with the first years of his marriage during which he and his wife lived in harmony, Pablo Picasso achieved a degree of fulfilment and stability in his personal life. His young son Paulo became a source of inspiration for him. The same was true for Olga, who frequently served as a model for her husband. Picasso portrayed the child in pencil, alone or in his mother Olga's arms, and later in oil, as a bust, depicting him drawing or playing. Paulo also posed dressed as Harlequin (1923), as Pierrot (1925), on his rocking horse (1926), and so on.

This period of relative family tranquillity ended when Picasso met Marie-Thérèse Walter in 1927 and began an affair with her. Pablo Picasso and Olga separated permanently in 1935. Olga sought a divorce, which he refused, and she went to live in the south of France with Paulo, then aged 14.

=== Working life ===
Paulo Picasso subsequently became Pablo's chauffeur. Poorly paid for this service, his father provided him with only a meagre allowance and refused to offer any financial assistance to his mother, Olga, who gradually sank into poverty. She died on 11 February 1955. Relations between the painter and his son deteriorated progressively. Pablo openly considered Paulo an "imbecile" and regularly humiliated him. One day, he told him: "You're a bourgeois anarchist and an incompetent." Having become the painter's punch bag, Paulo Picasso was not allowed to enter his father's villa in Cannes or even to meet him when he was working. Forced into a precarious existence, he suffered from alcoholism and was unable to free himself from Pablo Picasso's control, who proved to be his only source of income.

=== Personal life ===
Paulo Picasso's first wife was Émilienne Lotte. The couple separated in 1951, after the birth of two children:

- Pablito Picasso (1949–1973), who died by suicide
- Marina Picasso (b. 1950), who was five months old when her parents separated

He remarried Christiane, known as Christine Pauplin (1928–2026), whom he met in 1955. She gave him a third child:

- Bernard Picasso (b. 1959)

=== Later life and death ===
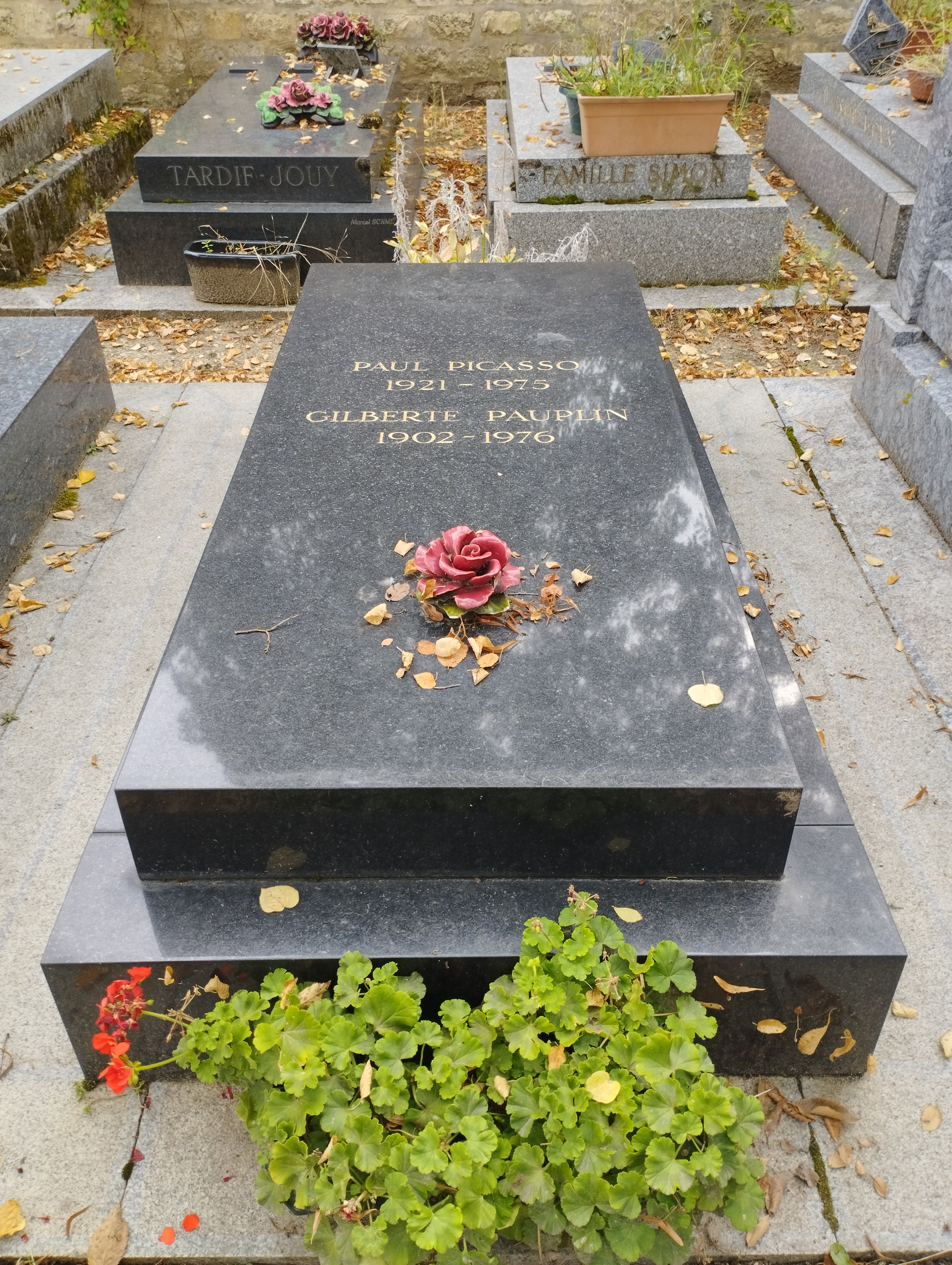
Tomb of Paulo Picasso in Montparnasse Cemetery (division 16)

Pablo Picasso died on 8 April 1973, at the age of 91. As the painter's only legitimate son, Paulo was entitled to a share of the inheritance, which allowed him to significantly improve his lifestyle. He devoted himself more fully to his passion for luxury cars.

However, on 12 July 1973 he lost his eldest son, Pablito Picasso, who died after ingesting bleach and enduring a long and painful illness.

Suffering from liver cancer, Paulo Picasso died on 5 June 1975, at the age of 54. He is buried in Montparnasse Cemetery (division 16) in Paris.

== Paulo Picasso in his father's works ==
This is only a partial list:

- Paulo in a White Cap, bust portrait, 1922, oil on canvas, Museo Picasso Málaga
- Portrait of Paulo, the artist's son, 1923, oil on canvas, 27 × 22 cm
- Paul Drawing, 1923, oil on canvas, 130 × 97 cm, Musée Picasso Paris
- Paul as Harlequin, 1924, oil on canvas, 130 × 97.5 cm, Musée Picasso Paris
- Paul as Pierrot, 1925, oil on canvas, 130 × 97 cm, Musée Picasso Paris
- Paul on his Rocking Horse, 1926, oil on canvas
