= Rue des Grands-Augustins =

Street in Paris, France

Rue des Grands Augustins
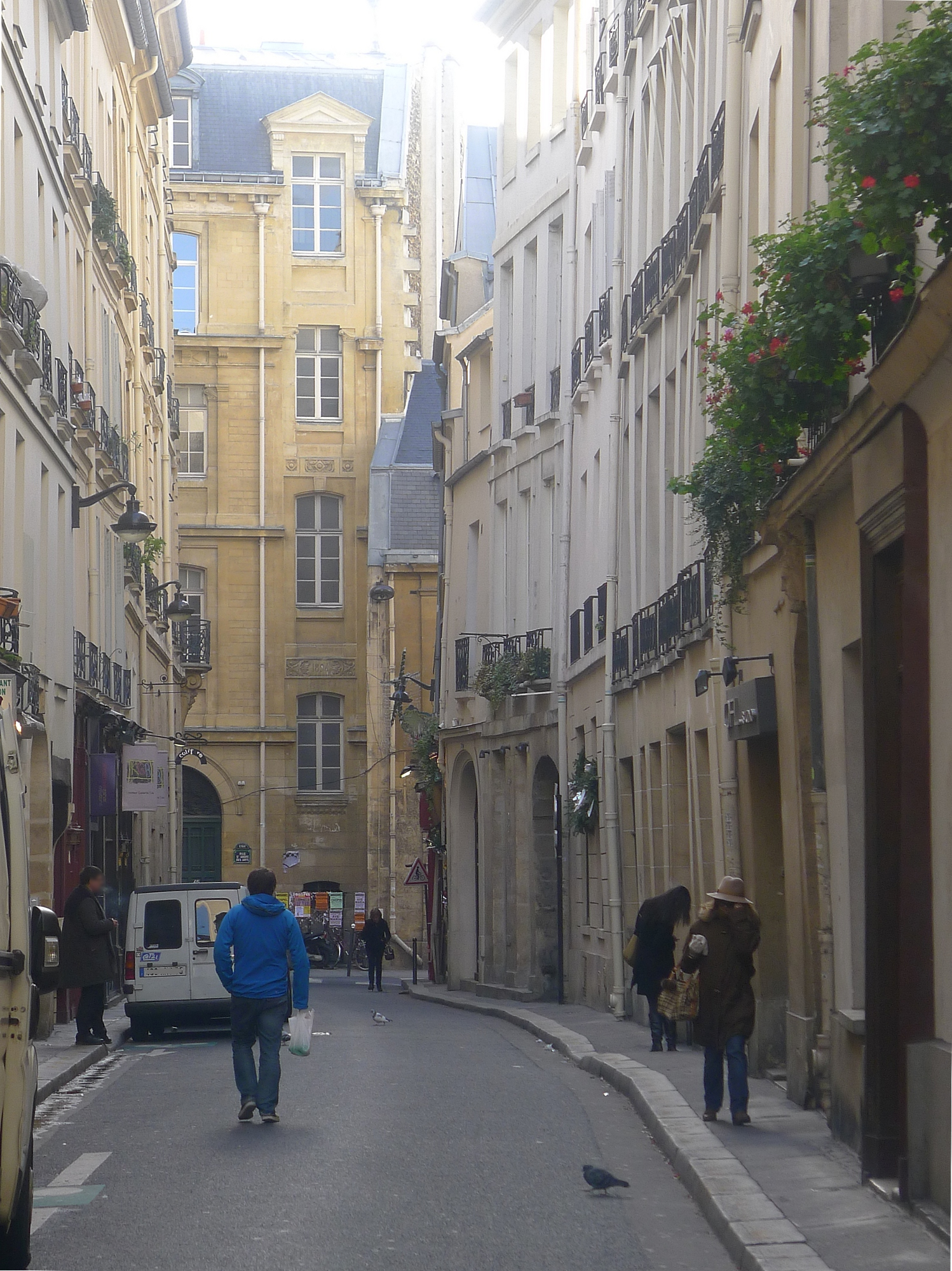

- Location within Paris
- Length: 213 m (699 ft)
- Width: 10 m (33 ft)
- Arrondissement: 6th
- Quarter: Monnaie
- Coordinates: 48°51′16″N 2°20′26.8″E
- From: 51 Quai des Grands Augustins
- To: 52 Rue Saint-André-des-Arts

The Rue des Grands Augustins is a street in Saint-Germain-des-Prés in the 6th arrondissement of Paris, France.

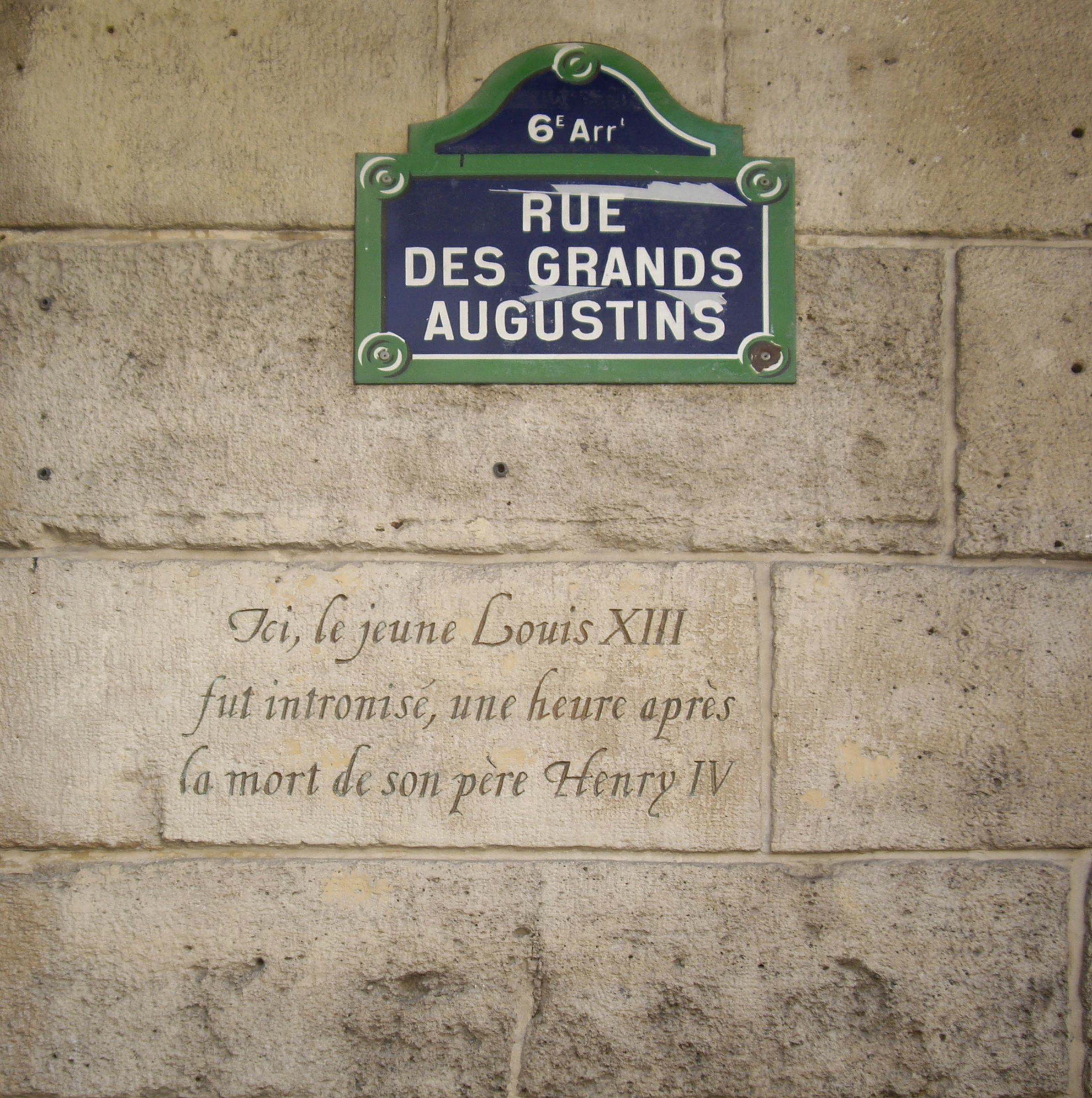
Louis XIII received the sacrament in the Rue des Grands Augustins, one hour after the assassination of his father Henry IV.

== Access ==
Located near the Metro station: Odéon.

Located near the Metro station: Saint-Michel.

== Notable residents ==
- Pablo Picasso, from 1937 to 1948
