= Paloma Picasso =

French-Spanish fashion designer (born 1949)

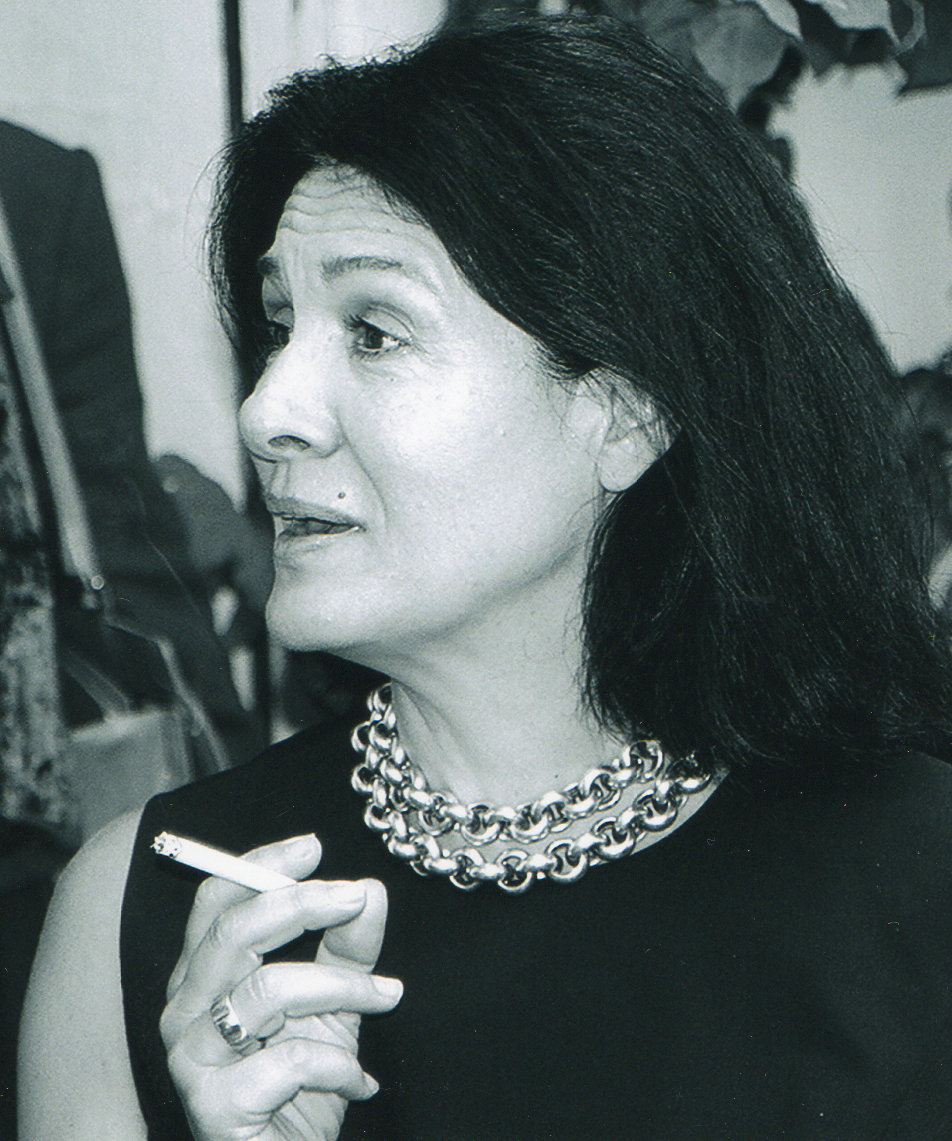
- Born: Anne Paloma Ruiz-Picasso y Gilot; 19 April 1949 (age 77); Vallauris, France
- Occupations: Fashion designer, jewellery designer, businesswoman, socialite
- Spouses: Rafael López-Cambil (m. 1978; div. 1998); Eric Thévenet (m. 1999)
- Parents: Pablo Picasso; Françoise Gilot
- Relatives: Claude Picasso (brother); Maya Widmaier-Picasso (half-sister); Jonas Salk (stepfather); Marina Picasso (niece); Bernard Ruiz-Picasso (nephew)

Paloma Picasso (born Anne Paloma Ruiz-Picasso y Gilot on 19 April 1949) is a French jewelry designer and businesswoman. She is best known for her collaboration with Tiffany & Co and her signature perfumes.

The daughter of artists Pablo Picasso and Françoise Gilot, she is represented in many of her father's works, such as Paloma with an Orange and Paloma in Blue. She is also represented in her mother's work, "Paloma à la Guitare" (1965), which sold for $1.3 million in 2021.

Picasso is renowned for being among the most stylish ladies in the world (in 1978, in the International Best Dressed Hall of Fame List) . She was a muse to fashion designer Yves Saint Laurent, and Vanity Fair has inducted her into the International Best Dressed Hall of Fame List. An award-winning designer, her work is in the collection of the Smithsonian Institution's National Museum of Natural History and Chicago's Field Museum of Natural History.

== Early life ==
Paloma Picasso was born in Paris to artists Pablo Picasso and Françoise Gilot on April 19, 1949. Her name, Paloma (Dove), is associated with the symbol her father designed for the World Peace Council's World Congress of Partisans for Peace, held in Paris at the time of Paloma's birth, and it can be found in many of her father's works.

Picasso spent her childhood in Paris and the South of France, where she and her older brother Claude Picasso were immersed in the vibrant culture and intellectual zeitgeist. She took an interest in drawing as a child, "but, as I grew up I started feeling the weight of my heritage," she said.

Picasso had a half-brother, Paulo Picasso (1921–1975), and a half-sister, Maya Picasso (1935–2022), from her father. She has another half-sister, Aurelia (b. 1956), from her mother's marriage to artist Luc Simon.

== Career ==
After attending the Université Paris Nanterre, Picasso worked as a costume designer for the Folies Bergère in Paris.

Some rhinestone necklaces she had created from stones purchased at flea markets drew attention from critics. Encouraged by this early success, the designer pursued formal schooling in jewelry design. A year later, Picasso presented her first efforts to her friend, fashion designer Yves Saint Laurent, who immediately commissioned her to design accessories to accompany one of his collections. In 1971, Picasso launched her first collection of costume jewelry in his Rive Gauche boutiques in Paris. Her vintage 1940s style inspired Yves Saint Laurent's 1971 Scandal collection. Through him she became part of artist Andy Warhol's social circle.

Picasso portrayed Countess Erzsébet Báthory in Polish filmmaker Walerian Borowczyk's erotic film, Immoral Tales (1973), receiving praise from the critics for her beauty.

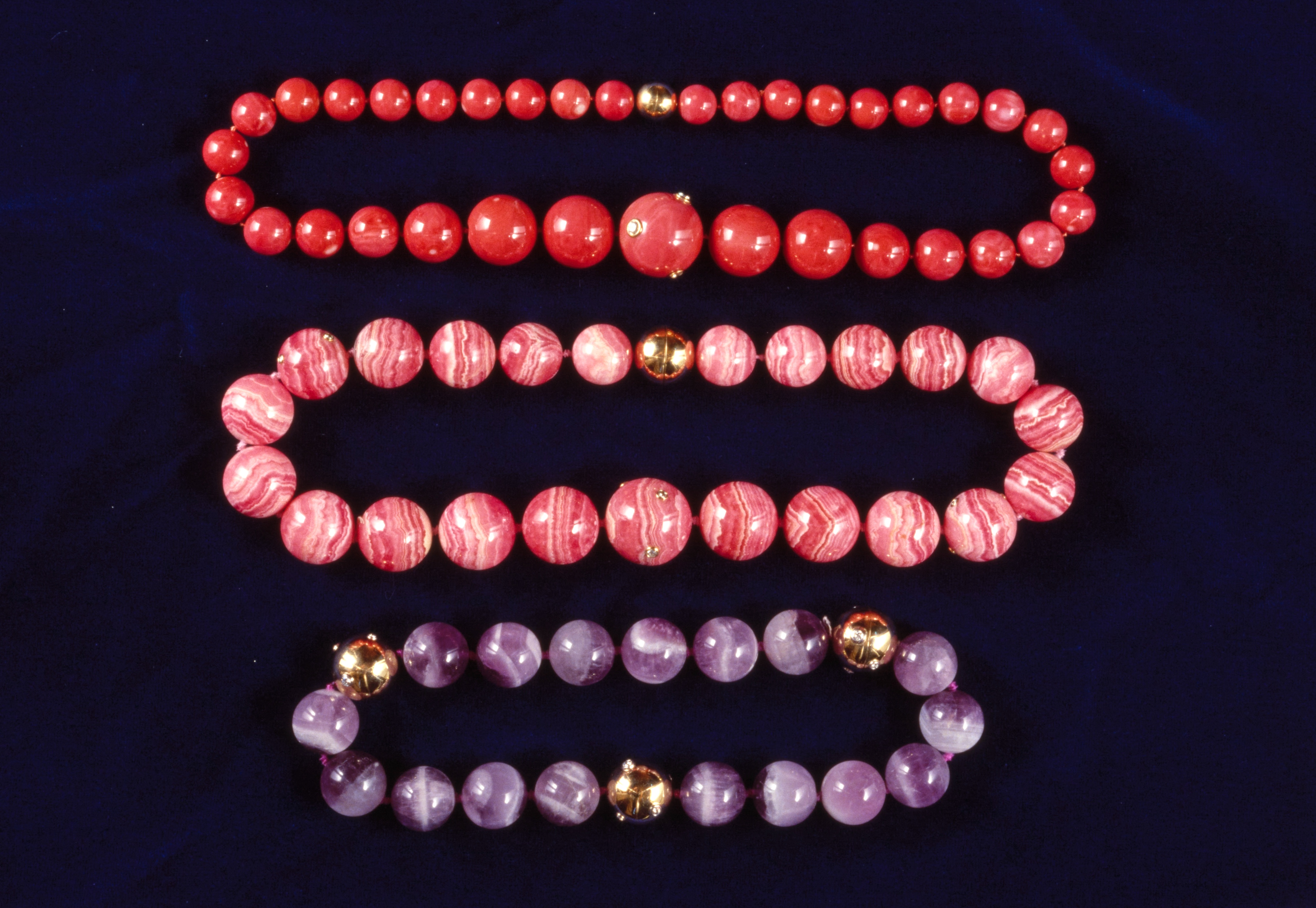
Paloma Picasso jewelry

After the death of her father in 1973, Picasso took a hiatus from designing to catalogue his estate and help establish the Musée Picasso in Paris.

In 1979, Picasso began working for the Greek jewelry company Zolotas.

In 1980 Picasso began designing jewelry for Tiffany & Co. of New York. The company's design director emeritus, John Loring, described Picasso's designs as "aggressively chic and uncompromisingly stylised. Her signature is seen in X’s, scribbles and zigzags, all sculpted in gold. She also punctuates gold with lavishly scaled colored gemstones."

In 1984 she began experimenting with fragrance, creating the "Paloma" perfume for L'Oréal. In the New York Post Picasso described it as intended for "strong women like herself." A cosmetics and bath line including body lotion, powder, shower gel, and soap were produced in the same year.

Logo for Paloma Picassos parfums.

Two American museums have acquired Picasso's work for their permanent collections. Housed in the Smithsonian Institution's National Museum of Natural History is a 396.30-carat kunzite necklace designed by her. And visitors to The Field Museum of Natural History in Chicago can view her 408.63-carat moonstone bracelet accented with diamond "lightning bolts."

Picasso has a penchant for red which started at an early age. Her red lipsticks were called "her calling cards." "Red lips have become my signature, so when I don’t want to be recognized, I don’t wear it," she said

In 2010, Picasso celebrated her 30th anniversary with Tiffany and Co. by introducing a collection based upon her love of Morocco, called Marrakesh. In 2011, she debuted her Venezia collection, which celebrates the city of Venice and its motifs.

== Personal life ==
Picasso's father cut off contact with her and her brother Claude Picasso when their mother's memoir, Life with Picasso, was published in 1964. In 1970, Picasso and Claude filed a lawsuit in France to be acknowledged as their father's legal children and hence heirs. When Picasso's father died in 1973, his widow Jacqueline Roque prevented Picasso and her brother from attending his funeral. After a lengthy legal battle, a French court ruled that they were heirs to the Picasso estate in 1974.

In 1978, Picasso married Argentine playwright and director Rafael Lopez-Cambil (also known as Rafael Lopez-Sanchez) in a black-and-white themed wedding. Picasso described Lopez-Cambil as the "architect" of her career, and she gave him a half share of her business in 1994. After splitting up in 1995, Lopez-Cambil filed a lawsuit against Picasso in the United States in a dispute over the business in 1997, but ten months later, he withdrew the claim. They divorced in 1998.

In 1999, Picasso married Eric Thévenet, a doctor of osteopathic medicine. They have homes in Lausanne, Switzerland and Marrakesh, Morocco.

== Awards and honors ==
Picasso used top-quality stones to construct several significant necklaces, some of which are currently owned by museums. Her 396.30-carat (79.260-gram) kunzite necklace is kept at the National Museum of Natural History of the Smithsonian Institution in Washington D.C., and a 408.63-carat (81.726-gram) moonstone bracelet adorned with diamond "lightning bolts" is kept in the permanent collection of the Field Museum of Natural History in Chicago.

In 1983, she was inducted into Vanity Fair's International Best Dressed Hall of Fame List.

In 1988, Picasso was honored by the Fashion Group International for her contribution to the industry.

In 1988, the Hispanic Designers Inc. presented Picasso with its MODA award for excellence in design at the fourth annual Hispanics Designers Gala Fashion Show and Benefit.

In 2011, Picasso was honored with an exhibition of her work at the National Museum of Women in the Arts.
