= Douglas Cooper (art historian) =

British art historian, art critic and art collector

- Born: Arthur William Douglas Cooper; 20 February 1911; Essex, England
- Died: 1 April 1984 (aged 73)
- Education: Repton School; Trinity College, Cambridge
- Occupations: Art historian, collector

(Arthur William) Douglas Cooper, who also published as Douglas Lord, (20 February 1911 – 1 April 1984) was a British art historian, art critic and art collector. He mainly collected Cubist works. During World War II he worked first as an interrogator and subsequently as an investigator of the trade in stolen artworks. After the war he bought a chateau in Provence and converted it into a gallery of early cubist art.

== Background ==
Cooper's father, Arthur Hamilton Cooper, of The Manor House, Blandford St Mary, Dorset, a Major with the Essex Regiment, was the second son of Sir William Charles Cooper, 3rd Baronet; his mother, Mabel Alice, was the daughter of Sir William Henry Marriott Smith-Marriott, 5th Baronet. Cooper's biographer and longtime partner John Richardson considered his suffering from the social exclusion of his family by his countrymen to be a defining characteristic of his friend, explaining in particular his Anglophobia.

Early in the 19th century, Cooper's forebears had emigrated to Australia and acquired great wealth, in particular property in Sydney. His great-grandfather Daniel Cooper became a member of the New South Wales legislature and was the first Speaker of the new Legislative Assembly in 1856. He was made a baronet in 1863 and spent his time both in Australia and England, eventually settling permanently in England, and dying in London. His son and grandson also lived there and sold their Australian property in the 1920s, very much to Douglas's annoyance.

== Education ==
As a teenager, his erudite uncle Gerald Cooper took him on a trip to Monte Carlo, where Cooper saw the Sergei Diaghilev's ballet company; his biographer traces an arc from here to Cooper's late work Picasso et le Théatre. He went to Repton School and Trinity College, Cambridge, graduating in 1930 with a third in the French section and a second (division 2) in the German section of the Medieval and Modern Languages Tripos. When he was 21, he inherited £100,000 (then about US$500,000, a significant fortune), enabling him to study art history at the Sorbonne, in Paris and at the University of Freiburg in Germany, which was not possible at the time in Cambridge.

== Art business ==
In 1933, he became a partner in the Mayor Gallery in London and planned to show works of Picasso, Léger, Miró and Klee in collaboration with Paris-based art dealers like Daniel-Henry Kahnweiler, A.K.Rudanovsky, Pierre Loeb (1897–1964); however, this collaboration ended quickly and unfavourably. Cooper was paid out in works of art.

Cooper attributed this failure not least to the conservative policy of the Tate Gallery; according to Richardson, his resentment was the catalyst for the structure of his own collection, designed to prove the backwardness of the Tate Gallery. At the outbreak of the Second World War in 1939, he had acquired 137 cubist works, partly with the help of the collector and dealer Gottlieb Reber (1880–1959), some of them masterpieces, using a third of his inheritance.

== Military career ==
Cooper was not eligible for regular military service due to an eye injury, so he chose to join a medical unit in Paris when World War II started, commanded by the art patron Etienne de Beaumont, who had commissioned works by Picasso and Braque, among others. His account of the transfer of wounded soldiers to Bordeaux to be shipped to Plymouth achieved some fame when published in 1941 by him and his co-driver C. Denis Freeman (The Road to Bordeaux). For this action, he received a French Médaille militaire.

Back in Liverpool, Cooper was arrested as a spy because of his French uniform, missing papers and improper behaviour, treatment for which he never forgave his fellow countrymen. Subsequently, he joined the Royal Air Force Intelligence unit and was sent to Cairo as an interrogator, a job at which he was enormously successful in squeezing out secrets from even hard-boiled prisoners, not least due to his "'evil queen' ferocity, penetrating intelligence, and refusal to take no for an answer, as well as his ability to storm, rant, and browbeat in Hochdeutsch, dialect, or argot, [which] were just the qualifications that his new job required." He greatly enjoyed the social life there.

== Nazi looted art ==
After a short interlude in Malta, Cooper was assigned to a unit trying to investigate Nazi looted art, called the Royal Air Force Intelligence, British Element, Monuments, Fine Arts, and Archives (MFAA). He was very successful, his most eminent discovery being the Schenker Papers which made it possible to prove that Paris dealers, Swiss collectors, German experts and museums, in particular the Museum Folkwang in Essen were deeply engaged in looting Jewish property and entartete Kunst as well as building collections for Hitler and Hermann Göring (Schenker was the transport company shipping art to Germany, having excellent bookkeeping)

Equally amazing to MFAA investigators was his detailed research on the Swiss art trade during the war; it turned out that many dealers and collectors had been involved in trading looted art. Cooper spent the whole month of February 1945 as emissary of the MFAA and the corresponding French organisation, interrogating dealers and collectors who had dealt with the Nazis and especially Theodor Fischer of the Fischer Gallery who in 1939 managed the sale of confiscated "degenerate" artworks.

He was particularly proud to have found and arrested the Swiss Charles Montag, one of Hitler's art advisors, who had assembled a private art collection of mostly stolen items for Hitler and was involved in the liquidation of the Paris gallery Bernheim-Jeune; surprisingly, Montag was quickly released. Cooper arrested him again immediately, only to see him set free once again, due to Montag's good connections to Winston Churchill, who refused to believe that his longtime friend and teacher, "good old Montag", could have done anything objectionable.

== Provence ==
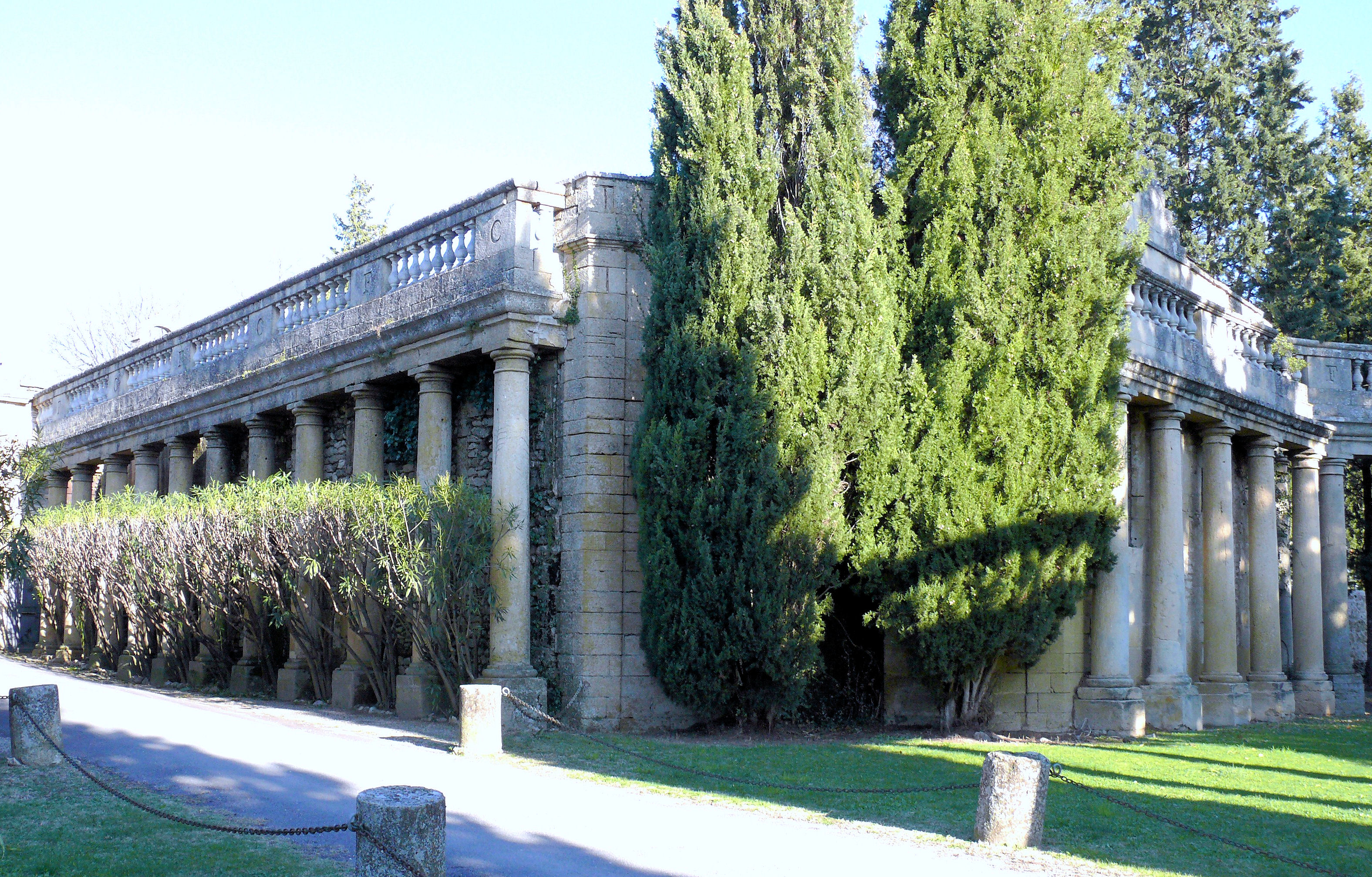
Entrance colonnade at the Château de Castille, Argilliers

After the Second World War, Cooper returned to England, but could not settle in his native country and moved to southern France, where in 1950 he bought the Château de Castille near Avignon, a suitable place to show his impressive art collection, which he continued to expand with newer artists such as Klee and Miró. During the following years, art historians, collectors, dealers and artists flocked to his home which had become something of an epicenter of Cubism, very much to his pride.

Léger and Picasso were regular guests; the latter even became a substantial part of its life. Cooper regarded Picasso as the only genius of the 20th century and he became a substantial promoter of the artist. Picasso tried several times to induce Cooper to sell his house to him; however, he would not agree and finally in 1958 recommended to Picasso the acquisition of Château of Vauvenargues.

== Liaison with John Richardson ==
In 1950, he became acquainted with the art historian John Richardson, sharing his life with him for the next 10 years. Richardson moved to the Château de Castille in 1952 and transformed the run-down mansion into a private museum of early Cubism. Cooper had been at home in the Paris art scene before World War II and had been active in the art business as well; by building his own collection, he also met many artists personally and introduced them to his friends. Richardson and Cooper became close friends of Picasso, Fernand Léger and Nicolas de Staël as well. At that time Richardson developed an interest in Picasso's portraits and contemplated creating a publication; more than 20 years later, these plans expanded into Richardson's four-part Picasso biography A Life of Picasso. In 1960, Richardson left Cooper and moved to New York City.

== Author ==
Cooper published frequently in The Burlington Magazine and wrote numerous monographs and catalogues about artists of the 19th century, including Degas, van Gogh and Renoir, but also about the Cubists he collected. He was among the first art critics to write about modern art with the same erudition common for artists of the past; in the years before the Second World War, he was a pioneer in this respect. When his catalogue of the exhibition The Courtauld Collection appeared in 1954, The Times wrote about it:

it is not easy to think of another critic who has so consistently applied to modern painting the scholarship normally used in the study of the works of the more distant past.

— THE TIMES: Benefactor of Art: Courtauld and His Collection

His most important achievement is probably the catalogue raisonné of Juan Gris, which he completed in 1978, six years before his death, and 40 years after beginning it. He was Slade Professor of Fine Art at Oxford from 1957 to 1958 and guest professor at Bryn Mawr and the Courtauld Institute in 1961.

== Appreciation ==
Cooper was a somewhat important figure among art experts of the 20th century, however he was controversial because of his contentiousness and his strong need to be the centre of public attention. He was accused not only of plagiarism and inaccuracies in his works, but also of "flexible ethics" and "cultivating quarrels as much as friends".

Cooper not only contributed to The Burlington Magazine as an author, but also served on its board of directors and held shares; he nevertheless tried to force the editor, Benedict Nicolson, to resign, unsuccessfully. In the 1950s, he attacked the Tate Gallery director John Rothenstein, mostly for not supporting Modern Art, trying to get him dismissed. He even managed to anger Picasso so much that he excluded him from his circle and surroundings after he pressed Picasso around 1970 to legalise his children.

== Misfortunes ==
In 1961, Cooper was found on a road outside Nîmes, heavily injured by stab wounds in the stomach; on his way to the post office in Nîmes to send an article about Picasso's birthday to a London newspaper, he had stopped at a notorious quarter and picked up a young Algerian Fellagha (resistance fighter against the French occupation forces) who had been interned in an open camp nearby. They drove to a lonely area, where the boy drew a knife and required Cooper's money or his life.

Like most people in France in those days, Cooper carried two purses, one with change and one with large bills. He handed over the first, infuriating the robber, who demanded more money and stabbed him several times. Cooper pushed back his intestines and dragged himself towards the city, his training as a medic proving very useful; against all odds, his cries for help in that lonely area were finally heard, so he could be saved, although he had lost much blood and his intestines were heavily damaged. The culprit was arrested and claimed to have been resisting a sexual assault.

In 1974, about 20 small paintings by Picasso, Braque and Gris were stolen from his house; Cooper dismissed his old housekeeper and in consequence lost the respect of his neighbours. Afterwards, he relocated to Monte Carlo, mainly for safety reasons, where he led a rather secluded life. Both incidents were reported by major English and French newspapers.

== Old age ==
Douglas may have started his career as a rebel in the cause of cubism, but he ended up as a rebel without a cause at all except a loathing for all forms of progressive art and the American pundits -- "the flying rabbis," he called them, "heads on upside down, like a Chagall" -- who promoted them. [...] he went on savaging anyone who dared write about "his" artists, but his tirades were all bark and no bite and no longer to be found in the pages of the Times Literary Supplement or The Burlington Magazine.

— John Richardson: The Sorcerer's Apprentice: Picasso, Provence, and Douglas Cooper., p. 300

In the summer of 1965, Cooper had organized a large exhibition in Toulouse called Picasso et le Théatre in amicable agreement with Picasso and published the book about this subject two years later. However he was not pleased with Picasso's late work. As a protest against praise in the French art magazine Connaissance des Arts, he made sure that a letter to the editor was published after the death of Picasso in 1973, where he declared:

I may, I believe, presume to belong to the serious admirers of Picasso's oeuvre being able to appraise his work. Thus I contemplated these pictures extensively. But they are only incoherent doodles done by a frenetic dotard in the anteroom of death. This had to be said for the record. Faithfully.

— DOUGLAS COOPER, in: Connaissance des Arts, Nr. 257, Juli 1973, quoted according to Malen gegen die Zeit, 2006

Although it looks like he might have wanted to come to terms with the Tate Gallery at the end of his life (in 1983, he organized the exhibition Essential Cubism for them), he never overcame his aversion to England. In particular, he did not esteem any art produced in his native country. In a letter to the editor of The Times, he declared in 1980:

I can see nothing in the work of any British artist of the twentieth century which obliges me – judging of course, by international and eternal standards of achievement – to recognize a major creative talent. To my eyes, the work of all of them seems mediocre, uninspired and not particularly competent.

— DOUGLAS COOPER, letter to the editor: The Times (London, United Kingdom), 28 February 1980.

Towards the end of his life, he was honoured by being appointed the first foreign patron of the Museo del Prado in Madrid, which made him very proud. In gratitude, he donated his best Gris to the Prado, Portrait of the Artist's Wife from 1916, and a cubist Still Life with Pigeons by Picasso. His only other donation went to the Kunstmuseum Basel; the Tate Gallery didn't receive anything. Cooper died on 1 April 1984 (April Fools' Day), perhaps completely fitting, as he predicted. He left an incomplete catalogue raisonné of Paul Gauguin and his art collection to his adopted son William McCarty Cooper (having adopted him according to French law, in order that nobody else would inherit anything, in particular not his family). His written legacy is kept at the Getty Research Institute, Los Angeles, CA.

== Selected publications ==
- C. Denis Freeman, Douglas Cooper: The road to Bordeaux. Harper, New York and London 1941
- Daniel-Henry Kahnweiler (Transl.: Douglas Cooper): Juan Gris : his life and work. Valentin, New York 1947
- Douglas Cooper: William Turner 1775–1851. Les éditions Braun. Paris 1949
- Douglas Cooper (Hg.: Kenneth Clark): Paul Klee. Penguin Books, Middlesex 1949
- Douglas Cooper: Henri Rousseau. [Französisch – Englisch – Deutsch]. Braun/Soho Gallery. Paris/London 1951
- Douglas Cooper (Hsg., Übers.: Paola Calvino): Pastelle von Edgar Degas. Holbein-Verlag, Basel 1952
- Douglas Cooper (Hsg., Ausgew. u. eingel. von Georg Schmidt): Henri de Toulouse-Lautrec. Kohlhammer, Stuttgart 1955
- Douglas Cooper, R. Wehrli et al.: Masterpieces of French Painting from the Bührle Collection. – The National Gallery – London – 29 September – 5 November 1961 Katalog. Arts Council of Britain, London 1961
- Douglas Cooper: Nicolas de Staël, Masters and Movements, Weidenfeld and Nicolson Ltd. London, 1961.
- Douglas Cooper: Pablo Picasso Les Déjeuners. Éditions Cercle d'Art, Paris 1962
- Douglas Cooper (Hsg., Einl. von Kenneth Clark, Übers. Ingeborg Ramseger unter Mitarb. von Johanna Manns u. Eva Jantzen.): Berühmte private Kunstsammlungen. Stalling, Oldenburg/Hamburg 1963
- Douglas Cooper (Red.): Georges Braque. Ausstellungskatalog. Haus d. Kunst, München, 18. Oktober bis 15. Dezember 1963
- Douglas Cooper (Einleit.): PICASSO Deux Epoques *. Gemälde 1960–65 und aus den Jahren 1954, 1957, 1944. Mengis + Sticher im Auftrag, Luzern 1966
- Douglas Cooper: Picasso et le Théatre. Éditions Cercle d'Art, Paris 1967
- Douglas Cooper (Red.): Graham Sutherland. Ausstellungskatalog. Haus d. Kunst München, 11. März – 7. Mai 1967; Gemeentemuseum Den Haag, 2. Juni – 30. Juli 1967; Haus am Waldsee Berlin, 11. Aug. – 24. Sept. 1967; Wallraf-Richartz-Museum Köln, 7. Okt. – 20. Nov. 1967
- Douglas Cooper (Hsg.): Große Familiensammlungen. Droemer/Knaur, München/Zürich 1963
- Douglas Cooper (Übers. a. d. Franz. Jean Yves Mock): César. Bodensee-Verlag, Amriswil 1970
- Douglas Cooper: The cubist epoch. Phaidon Press, London 1970
- Douglas Cooper: Juan Gris. Kunsthalle Baden-Baden, Baden-Baden 1974
- Douglas Cooper (Margaret Potter, Juan Gris): Juan Gris. Catalogue Raisonné de l'Oeuvre Peint (établi avec la collaboration de Margaret Potter.). Berggruen, Paris 1977
