= Diana Widmaier Picasso =

French art historian

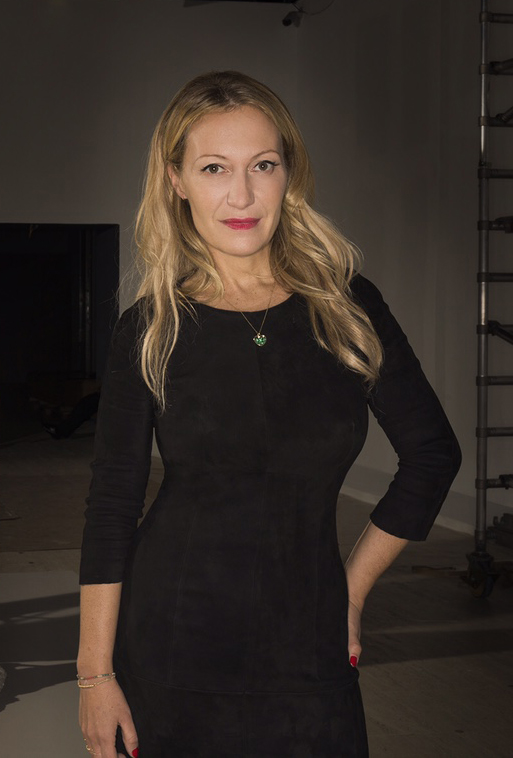
- Born: March 12, 1974 (age 52); Marseille, France
- Other name: Diana Widmaier–Picasso
- Occupations: art historian, art curator
- Known for: Menē
- Children: 1
- Mother: Maya Widmaier-Picasso
- Relatives: Pablo Picasso (maternal grandfather)

Diana Widmaier Picasso (born March 12, 1974) is a French art historian specialising in modern art, and living in Paris.

== Life ==
Diana Widmaier Picasso is the daughter of Maya Widmaier-Picasso, and the maternal granddaughter of Pablo Picasso and Marie-Thérèse Walter. After a master's degree in private law (from Paris-Assas University), and a master's degree in art history (from Paris-Sorbonne University) — her thesis was about the art market in France in the seventeenth century — she decided to specialise in old master drawings. She worked on several exhibitions in museums (Metropolitan Museum of Art in New York, Institut Néerlandais in Paris), and worked in old master drawings at Sotheby's in London and Paris for three years.

She is the co-founder, with Roy Sebag, and chief artistic officer of a jewelry company called Menē launched in 2017. The brand recently collaborated with the estate of Louise Bourgeois on a few pieces.

In 2017, she was named Knight of the Ordre des Arts et des Lettres.

In 2022, she was named Officer of the Ordre des Arts et des Lettres by Rima Abdul Malak.

== DWP Editions - Catalogue raisonné ==
In 2003, Diana Widmaier Picasso set up a company called DWP Editions and started gathering information on her grandfather’s works. Since 2013, she has been working on a catalogue raisonné of Picasso’s sculptures with a team of researchers (Olivia Speer and Claire Rougé).

== Curatorial works ==
- « Maya Ruiz-Picasso, daughter of Pablo », Paris, Musée national Picasso-Paris, April 16 - December 31, 2022
- « Picasso: La Scultura », Roma, Galleria Borghese, October 9, 2018 - February 3, 2019
- « Picasso and Maya: Father and Daughter », Paris, Gagosian Gallery, October 18, 2017 - February 24, 2018
- « Desire », Miami, Moore Building, Art Basel Miami Beach, November 30 - December 4, 2016
- « Picasso's Picassos: A Selection from the Collection of Maya Ruiz-Picasso », New York, Gagosian Gallery, November 10, 2016 - February 18, 2017
- « Picasso.mania », Paris, Galeries nationales du Grand Palais, October 7, 2015 - February 29, 2016
- « Picasso and Marie-Thérèse: L'Amour Fou », New York, Gagosian Gallery, April 14 - July 15, 2011

== Books ==
- Diana Widmaier Picasso, Maya Ruiz-Picasso, fille de Pablo, Paris, Skira, 2022
- Diana Widmaier Picasso, Philippe Charlier, Picasso Sorcier, Paris, Gallimard NRF, 2022
- Diana Widmaier Picasso, Picasso and Maya: Father and Daughter, New York, Gagosian, 2019
- Diana Widmaier Picasso, Picasso: The Impossible Collection, New York, Assouline, 2019
- Diana Widmaier Picasso, Art Can Only Be Erotic, Munich, Prestel, 2005 ISBN 3-7913-3160-4.
