= Françoise Gilot =

French painter (1921–2023)

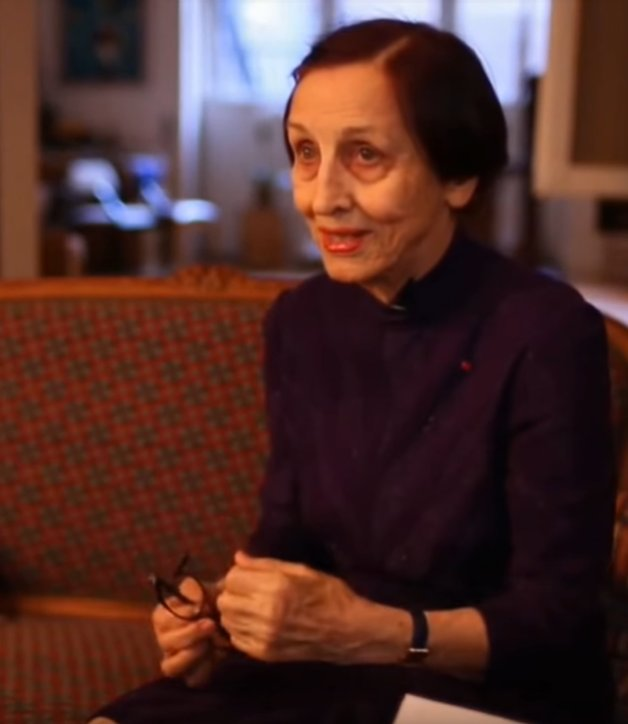
- Gilot in 2013
- Born: Françoise Gaime Gilot; 26 November 1921; Neuilly-sur-Seine, France
- Died: 6 June 2023 (aged 101); New York City, U.S.
- Education: British Institute in Paris (, 1939)
- Known for: Painting
- Movement: School of Paris
- Spouses: Luc Simon (m. 1955; div. 1962); Jonas Salk (m. 1970; died 1995)
- Partner: Pablo Picasso (1943–1953)
- Children: 3, including Claude and Paloma Picasso
- Awards: Legion of Honour
- Website: www.francoisegilot.com

Françoise Gaime Gilot (English: /ʒiːˈloʊ/ zhee-LOH, French: [fʁɑ̃swaz ʒilo]; 26 November 1921 – 6 June 2023) was a French painter. Gilot first made her mark in the post-war milieu of artists who redefined the European artistic landscape. With a career that spanned more than seven decades, her work was largely produced in watercolors and ceramics, and combined elements of abstraction, figuration, and symbolism, often drawing on mythology, personal experience, and themes of transformation. Gilot exhibited widely in Europe and the United States and was represented by major galleries, with her paintings held in numerous public and private collections.

Gilot was also known for her relationship with artist Pablo Picasso, with whom she shared a decade-long partnership and had two children. Unlike many of Picasso's other companions, she left him and later became the only one to publicly recount her experiences in the memoir Life with Picasso (1964), which became an international bestseller despite Picasso's opposition. In the decades following their separation, Gilot deliberately established an independent artistic identity, gaining increasing institutional recognition late in life, including major retrospectives and permanent museum installations that affirmed her significance as an artist in her own right. In 2021, her painting Paloma à la Guitare, a 1965 portrait of her daughter, sold for $1.3 million at Sotheby's in London.

== Early life and education ==
Gilot was born in Neuilly-sur-Seine, France, to Émile Gilot and Madeleine Gilot (née Renoult). Her father was a businessman and agronomist, and her mother was a watercolor artist. Her father was a strict, well-educated man. Gilot began writing with her left hand as a young child, but at the age of four, her father forced her to write with her right hand. As a result, Gilot became ambidextrous. She decided at the age of 5 to become a painter. The following year, her mother tutored her in art, beginning with watercolors and India ink. Gilot was then taught by her mother's art teacher, Mademoiselle Meuge, for six years. While training to be a lawyer, Gilot was known to skip her morning law classes to study art with Monsieur Gerber, a retired artist living in Paris. Gilot had her first exhibition of paintings in Paris in 1943.

Gilot was introduced to art at a young age by her mother and grandmother. Her grandmother had held a party when Françoise was about five years old. A certain man caught Gilot's eye as being interesting, and she asked her grandmother who the man was. He turned out to be a painter, Emile Mairet. Gilot's father became close friends with the painter, and Françoise would often tag along to visit his studio. At age six, Françoise's mother began teaching her art, with the exception of drawing. Her mother believed artists become too dependent on erasers and instead taught Françoise in watercolor and India ink. If she made a mistake, she would have to make it intentional to her work. By the age of 13, she began to study with Mlle. Meuge, which continued for six years. At the age of 14, she was introduced to ceramics and a year later, she studied with the Post-Impressionist painter Jacques Beurdeley.

=== Education ===
Gilot's father Emile wanted his daughter to be just as educated as him, and as a result, oversaw his daughter's education very closely. Gilot was tutored at home, beginning at a young age, and by the time she was six years old, she had a good knowledge of Greek mythology. By the age of fourteen, she was reading books by Edgar Allan Poe, Charles Baudelaire, and Alfred Jarry. While her father had hoped she would go to school to become a scientist or lawyer, Gilot was frequenting museums in Europe to understand and gain an appreciation for the masters.

In 1939 she attended the British Institute in Paris and received a certificate in English proficiency issued by the University of Cambridge Local Examinations Syndicate. During 1939, Gilot's father still wanted her to complete a degree in international law, and out of fear that Paris would be bombed during the war, Gilot was sent to Rennes, France, to begin law school.

== Career ==
At the age of 19, she abandoned her studies in law to devote her life to art. She began private lessons with a fugitive Hungarian Jewish painter, Endre Rozsda, and attended classes at the Académie Julian. In 1942, after abandoning law several times and returning on the insistence of her father, Gilot studied law for a second year and passed her written exams, but failed her oral exams.

At the age of 21, she met Picasso. Although Picasso had influenced Gilot's work as a cubist painter, she developed her own style. She avoided the sharp edges and angular forms that Picasso sometimes used. Instead, she used organic figures. During World War II, Gilot's father attempted to save the most valuable household belongings by moving them, but the truck was bombed by the Nazis, leading to the loss of Gilot's drawings and watercolors.

Gilot was active in the post-War milieu of artists who redefined the European artistic scene. Gilot had her first important exhibition in Paris in 1943, after which Gilot signed a contract with the renowned art dealer Daniel-Henri Kahnweiler. She was one of only two female artists to ever be signed by him. Her first exhibit with Kahnweiler's famed Galerie Louise Leiris took place in 1952 in Paris, which became a critical moment in her life and career.

Concurrent with creating the "Labyrinth Series" of paintings, Gilot was also writing the text for her well-known best seller, Life with Picasso, exploring her ten-year relationship with Pablo Picasso.

Throughout the 1980s and 1990s, Gilot designed costumes, stage sets, and masks for productions at the Guggenheim in New York City.

In 1973, Gilot was appointed art director of the scholarly journal Virginia Woolf Quarterly. In 1976, she joined the board of the Department of Fine Arts at the University of Southern California, where she taught summer courses and took on organizational responsibilities until 1983.

Gilot split her time between New York and Paris, working on behalf of the Salk Institute.

In August 2018, Gilot released three sketchbooks that documented the journeys she made in Venice, India, and Senegal.

== Death ==
Gilot died in a New York City hospital on 6 June 2023, at the age of 101, after suffering from heart and lung ailments.

== Art work ==
Francoise Gilot's career lasted eight decades, amassing a body of work comprising 1,600 paintings and 3,600 works on paper. Gilot explained, "I always knew what I wanted to say, it was how to say it."

Her provocative 1946 work Adam Forcing Eve to Eat an Apple re-examined the Biblical tale, taking a fresh look at temptation, punishment and the blaming of women.

The "Labyrinth Series" (1961–1963) is one of Gilot's most original and important sequences. In these paintings, she draws upon Greek mythology, personal mythology, and circus motifs. Gilot's paintings pulse with dynamic rhythm, overthrowing conventions to let her impulses discover intense pictorial equivalences of mythical storytelling.

=== Art market ===
Her stature as an artist and the value of her work have increased over the years. In 2021 her painting Paloma à la Guitare, a 1965 portrait of her daughter, sold for $1.3 million at Sotheby's in London. As of January 2022, her work has been on exhibit in multiple leading museums, including the Metropolitan Museum of Art, the Museum of Modern Art, and the Centre Pompidou. At Christie's in Hong Kong, her artwork entitled "Living Forest", an abstract canvas created in 1977, also sold for $1.3 million.

=== Collections ===
Gilot's artwork is showcased in more than a dozen leading museums, including the permanent collection of the Metropolitan Museum of Art in New York and the Centre Pompidou in Paris.

The Berman Museum of Art at Ursinus College in Collegeville, Pennsylvania is an international center for the study of Gilot's works. In addition to her personal archives, the museum houses over 270 works of art by the artist, including the most comprehensive collection of her lithographs and etchings outside the artist's estate.

== Personal life ==
Once asked what it was in her that attracted such outstanding men, Gilot responded: "I think I am just as interesting as they. Lions mate with lions. They don't mate with mice."

=== Relationship with Pablo Picasso ===
At 21, Gilot met Pablo Picasso, then 61. Picasso first saw Gilot in a restaurant in the spring of 1943, during the German occupation of France. Dora Maar, the photographer who was his muse and lover at the time, was devastated to learn that Picasso was replacing her with the much younger artist. After Picasso's and Gilot's meeting, she moved in with him in 1946. They spent almost 10 years together, and those years revolved around art. Picasso painted La femme-fleur, and then his old friend Henri Matisse, who liked Gilot, announced that he would create a portrait of her, in which her body would be pale blue and her hair leaf green.

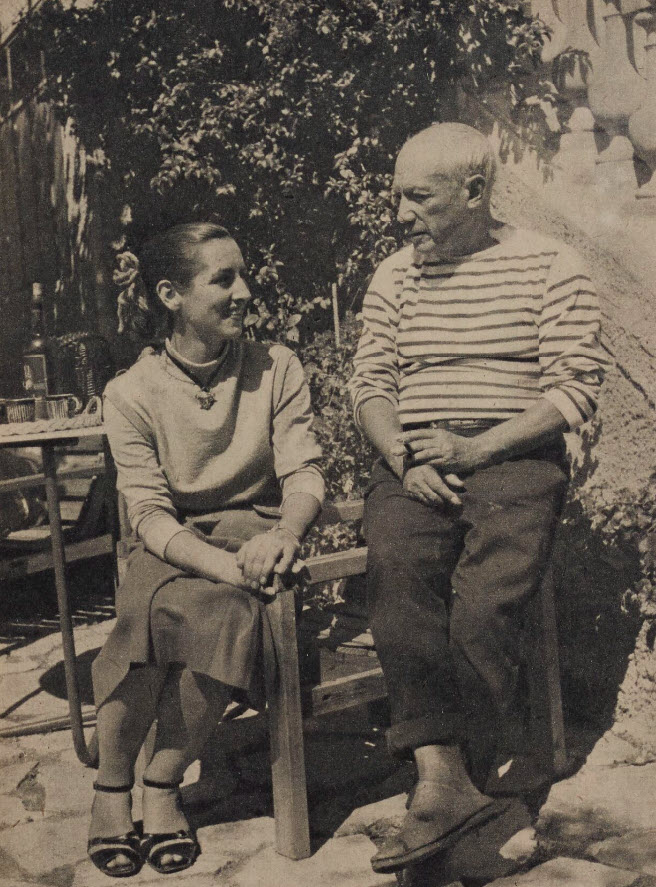
Gilot and Pablo Picasso,1952

Gilot said of her relationship with Picasso:

He did not know me well at all. I am very secretive. I smile and I'm polite, but that doesn't mean that I am in agreement, or that I will do as I said I would do. It's just a screen. He thought I would react like all his other women. That was a completely wrong opinion. I had other ideas. I did not put my narcissism in being represented by him. I couldn't care less.

It was believed by some art historians that Gilot's relationship with Picasso is what cut short her artistic career. When she left Picasso, he told all art dealers he knew not to purchase her art, whereas Gilot noted that continuing to identify her in relation to Picasso "does her a great disservice as an artist."

Picasso and Gilot never married, but had two children together because he promised to love and care for them. Their son, Claude, was born in 1947, and their daughter, Paloma, was born in 1949. During their 10 years together, Gilot was often harassed on the streets of Paris by Picasso's legal wife Olga Khokhlova, a Russian former ballet dancer, and Picasso physically abused her as well. After Gilot left Picasso, the following happened according to Gilot's biographer Sacha Llewelyn:

Picasso, enraged, destroyed her possessions, including artworks, books and her treasured letters from Matisse. Telling her she was "headed straight for the desert", he then set out to destroy her career. Mobilising all his networks, he demanded that the Louise Leiris Gallery stop representing Gilot and that she no longer be invited to exhibit at the Salon de Mai. Explained away as the unfortunate behaviour of a moody genius, today this aggressive intervention is finally being seen for what it was: the devastating actions of a bully.

In 1964, 11 years after their separation, Gilot wrote Life with Picasso (with the art critic Carlton Lake), a book that sold over one million copies in dozens of languages, despite an unsuccessful legal challenge from Picasso attempting to stop its publication. From then on, Picasso refused to see Claude or Paloma again. All the profits from the book were used to help Claude and Paloma mount a case to become Picasso's legal heirs.

=== Marriages ===
Gilot married artist Luc Simon in 1955. Their daughter Aurélia was born the following year. The couple divorced in 1962.

In 1969, Gilot was introduced to the American inventor Jonas Salk at the home of mutual friends in La Jolla, California. Salk was a researcher, and he developed the first safe polio vaccine. Their shared appreciation of architecture led to a brief courtship and a 1970 wedding in Paris. During their marriage, which lasted until Salk's death in 1995, the couple lived apart for half of every year as Gilot continued to paint in New York City, La Jolla, and Paris.

== Awards and honors ==
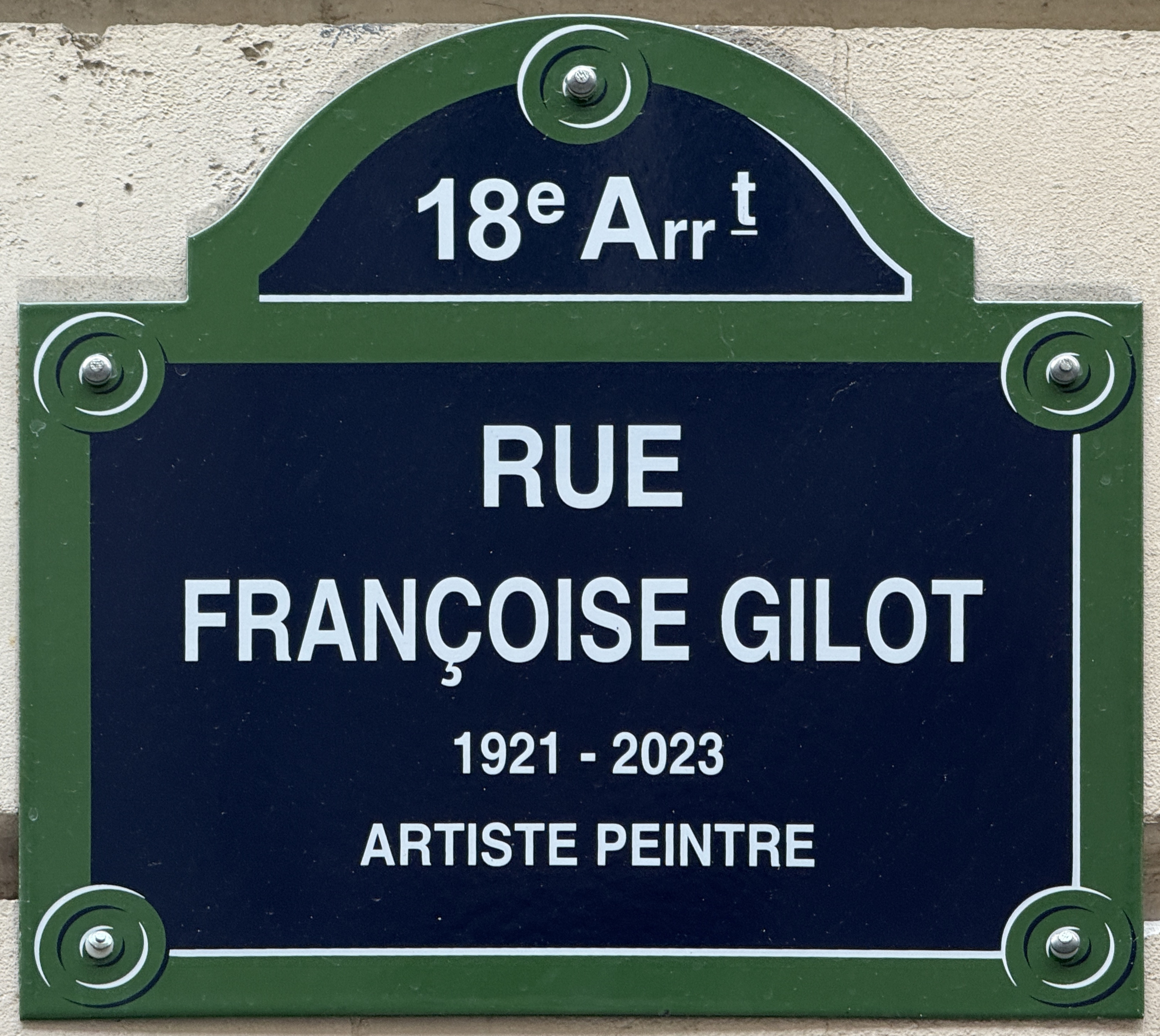
A plaque for Rue Françoise Gilot in Paris

Gilot was appointed a Chevalier de la Légion d'honneur in 1990. In 2010, she was named an Officer of the Légion d'honneur, the French government's highest honour for the arts.

In 2024, the Musée Picasso in Paris reinstalled its permanent collection to include a dedicated gallery highlighting Françoise Gilot's work and career, recognizing her as an artist in her own right rather than solely Picasso's former partner.

In 2025, a public square in the 18th arrondissement of Paris was named Rue Françoise Gilot in her memory.

== In popular culture ==
Gilot was played by Natascha McElhone in the 1996 film Surviving Picasso, and by Clémence Poésy in the 2018 season of Genius, which focuses on the life and art of Pablo Picasso.

== Books ==
- Françoise Gilot and Carlton Lake, Life with Picasso, McGraw-Hill, 1964; Anchor Books/Doubleday, 1989, ISBN 978-0-385-26186-9
- Françoise Gilot, Le regard et son Masque, Paris: Calmann-Lévy, 1975, ISBN 978-2-7021-0092-9 – focuses on her development as an artist.
- Françoise Gilot, Interface: The Painter and the Mask, Press at California State University, Fresno, 1983, ISBN 978-0-9122-0103-0
- Barbara Haskell, Françoise Gilot: An Artist's Journey 1943–1987, California State Univ, 1987, ISBN 978-0-912201-12-2; Little, Brown, 1989.
- Françoise Gilot, Matisse and Picasso: A Friendship in Art, Doubleday, 1990, ISBN 978-0-385-26044-2; New York: Anchor Books, 1992, ISBN 978-0-385-42241-3

== Sources ==
- Françoise Gilot, Mel Yoakum, Françoise Gilot: monograph 1940–2000, Acatos, 2000, ISBN 978-2-940033-36-2
