= Olga Khokhlova =

Russian model and ballerina (1891–1955)

Olga Picasso
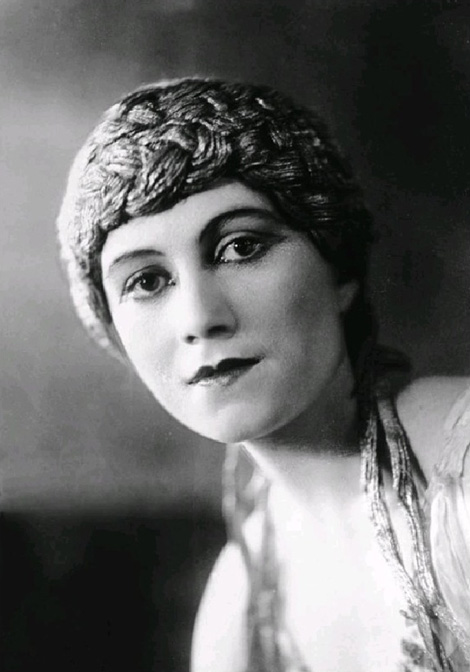
- Khokhlova in Afternoon of a Faun, c. 1916
- Born: Olga Stepanovna Khokhlova; 17 June 1891; Nezhin, Chernigov Governorate, Russian Empire
- Died: 11 February 1955 (aged 63); Cannes, France
- Occupation: Ballet dancer
- Spouse: Pablo Picasso (m. 1918; sep. 1935)
- Children: Paul (Paulo) Picasso; (b. 4 February 1921)
- Relatives: Marina Picasso (granddaughter); Bernard Ruiz-Picasso (grandson)

Olga Picasso (born Olga Stepanovna Khokhlova; (Note: Sometimes spelled Koklova or Kokhlova.) Russian: Ольга Степановна Хохлова; 17 June 1891 – 11 February 1955) was a Russian ballet dancer in the Ballets Russes, directed by Sergei Diaghilev and based in Paris. There she met and married the artist Pablo Picasso, served as one of his early muses, and was the mother of their son, Paul (Paulo).

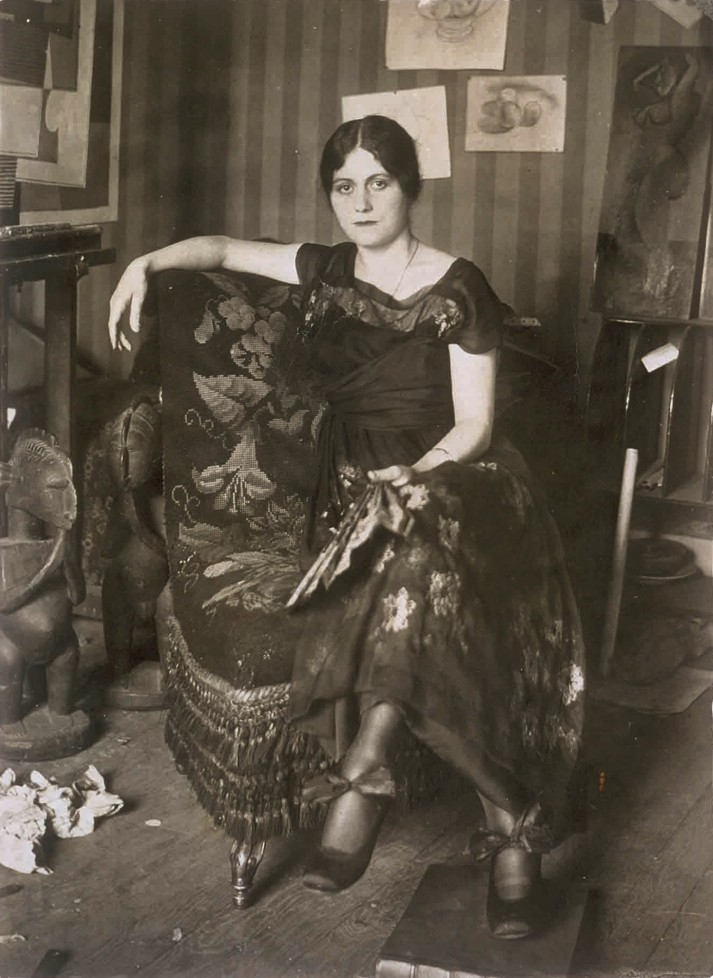
Olga Khokhlova in Picasso's Montrouge studio, spring 1918

Pablo Picasso, spring 1918, Portrait d'Olga dans un fauteuil (Olga in an Armchair), oil on canvas, 130 x 88.8 cm, Musée Picasso, Paris, France

== Early life ==
Khokhlova was born in the town of Nezhin, Chernigov Governorate, Russian Empire (present-day Ukraine) on 17 June 1891. Her father, Stepan Khokhlov, was a colonel in the Imperial Russian Army. Her mother Lydia Zinchenko was of Ukrainian descent. The Khokhlov family had three sons and two daughters. Olga decided to be a ballerina after being encouraged by a friend's sister who had joined the Diaghilev ballet. She studied in Saint Petersburg at a private ballet school and successfully auditioned to join the Ballets Russes of impresario Sergei Diaghilev, based in Paris. She performed in Europe and later America as a member of the company.

== Relationship with Picasso ==
In 1917, Pablo Picasso became involved in Parade, a ballet produced by Sergei Diaghilev, to music by Erik Satie and plot by Jean Cocteau. The ballet premiered on 18 May 1917 at the Théâtre du Châtelet in Paris. Picasso had designed the costumes and set for the ballet. After seeing Khokhlova dance in rehearsals for a ballet named Les Femmes de Bonne Humeur in Italy, he fell in love with her.

After meeting Picasso, Khokhlova left the dance company, which toured South America. She stayed in Barcelona with him. He introduced her to his family. At first, his mother disapproved of the idea of having Khokhlova as a daughter-in-law. However, Khokhlova was intent on marrying Picasso. They maintained a long engagement, in which she initially resisted sleeping with him. Khokhlova was isolated and reliant on Picasso, having become trapped in Spain without a passport. At this time, Picasso painted his first portrait of her as a Spanish girl (Olga Khokhlova in Mantilla).

After waiting six months for a visa, Khokhlova returned with Picasso to Paris. They lived apart for six months, with Khokhlova living at Hôtel Lutétia and Picasso living at his rented villa in Montrouge. To celebrate their engagement, Picasso painted Olga in an Armchair, a traditional portrait of Khokhlova in the style of Ingres, which depicts her wearing a black dress and holding a fan.

== Married life ==
Khokhlova married Picasso on 12 July 1918, at the Russian Orthodox Cathedral at the Rue Daru in Paris. Jean Cocteau and Max Jacob were witnesses to the marriage. The wedding had been postponed from May 1918, due to Khokhlova experiencing pain from a foot injury. The injury forced her to undergo an operation that resulted in having to wear plaster encasing her right leg. It was only when the leg had healed that the marriage could take place. After the wedding, the Picassos spent their honeymoon at the villa of Eugenia Errázuriz in Biarritz, where Picasso made drawings of his wife. By September 1918, Khokhlova had recovered from her injury, but required rehabilitation. She never danced again in public. By October 1918, the couple returned to Paris in search of an apartment. Picasso's dealer, Paul Rosenberg, found a suitable apartment next to his own home, at 23, Rue La Boétie, into which the Picassos moved the week before Christmas 1918.

== Marriage breakdown ==
On 4 February 1921, Khokhlova gave birth to a boy, Paul Joseph Picasso, usually known as 'Paulo'. From then on, Khokhlova and Picasso's relationship deteriorated. Picasso was proud of Khokhlova and his son, but she became obsessively protective of the boy. She enjoyed the prestige of being Picasso's wife and the idea of a celebrity lifestyle. When this drew criticism from Picasso's friends, he would blame Khokhlova for her refined tastes. In summer 1922, she became seriously ill while the Picassos were staying at the resort of Dinard. In mid-September, she was rushed to hospital in Paris for an emergency operation. By the end of the summer of 1923, Picasso's passion for Khokhlova had cooled, as he took possession of the floor above his apartment and began to frequent the brothels in Paris.

In 1927, Picasso began an affair with a 17-year-old French girl, Marie-Thérèse Walter. He continued to play the part of the conventional husband and father but continued his affair with his new mistress in secret. In the summer of 1928, the Picasso family spent time in Dinard, where Picasso also secreted his mistress away from his wife. However, the trip caused Khokhlova to become seriously ill again, resulting in the family returning to Paris on 5 September 1928. She again underwent an operation that required convalescence and, despite leaving the clinic on 10 October, was forced to return for a second operation before returning home in early December. She was back at the clinic by Christmas. This lengthy separation from his wife gave Picasso the freedom to spend time with his mistress. In 1930, Picasso purchased a chateau located an hour northwest of Paris named Boisgeloup, where Walter spent the week with him and Khokhlova would visit with Paulo on weekends. At Picasso's first major retrospective at the Galeries Georges Petit in 1932, he blatantly displayed numerous works of his mistress. Khokhlova had become obsessively jealous and suspicious. Picasso's grandson, Bernard Ruiz-Picasso, considered that by this time, Olga knew about the affair. Picasso's depictions of his wife were now reflective of her perturbed state. Over Christmas in 1931, he painted Woman with a Stiletto, a harrowing caricature of his unhappy wife.

In 1935, Khokhlova learned of the affair from a friend, who also informed her that Walter was pregnant. She was devastated, filed for divorce, and immediately moved to the Hôtel California with Paulo. She spent the next 20 years living in Parisian hotels, Boisgeloup and the South of France. Picasso refused to divide his property evenly with her, as required by French law, so Khokhlova stayed legally married to him until her death from cancer in Cannes, France, on 11 February 1955. She was mistakenly buried in an English rather than a Russian cemetery.

== Descendants ==
Khokhlova's son Paul (Paulo), who died on 5 June 1975, was married to Emilienne Lotte 10 May 1950. They divorced in 1953. They had two children: Pablito (born 5 May 1949 – died by suicide 2 July 1973) and Marina (born 14 November 1950). Later, Paulo married Christine Pauplin on 9 March 1962. The couple's only child, Bernard Ruiz-Picasso, co-founded the Picasso Museum in Malaga along with his mother.

== Bibliography ==
- Richardson, John (2007a). A Life of Picasso: The Triumphant Years, 1917–1932. Knopf. ISBN 978-0307266651.
- Huffington, Arianna Stassinopoulos (1988). Picasso: Creator and Destroyer. New York: Simon and Schuster. ISBN 0671454463.
