= Claude Picasso =

French filmmaker, designer and artist (1947–2023)

- Born: Claude Ruiz Gilot; 15 May 1947; Boulogne-Billancourt, France
- Died: 24 August 2023 (aged 76); Geneva, Switzerland
- Spouses: Sara Lavner (m. 1969; div. 1972); Sydney Russel (m. 1979; div. 2000)
- Parents: Pablo Picasso (father); Françoise Gilot (mother)
- Relatives: Paloma Picasso (sister); Maya Widmaier-Picasso (half-sister); Jonas Salk (stepfather); Marina Picasso (niece); Bernard Ruiz-Picasso (nephew)

Claude Ruiz Picasso (15 May 1947 – 24 August 2023) was a French photographer, cinematographer, film director, visual artist, graphic designer, businessman, and the third child of the artist Pablo Picasso.

== Life and career ==
Claude Ruiz Gilot was born in France to artists Françoise Gilot and Pablo Picasso on 15 May 1947. His father wanted to name him Pablo, but since he already had a son named Paul—the French equivalent—Gilot wanted to name him after Claude Gillot (1673–1722), a pioneering French Rococo artist and mentor to fellow artist Jean-Antoine Watteau. His surname was changed to Picasso at the age of 12.

Picasso lived in New York from 1967 to 1974. In 1968, he met Sara Lavner (Schultz), a young woman from Brooklyn, now a psychoanalyst. They married in 1969 and divorced in 1972.

He worked as an assistant for photographer Richard Avedon for almost a year, and studied cinema and mise-en-scène at the Actors Studio. He was a photojournalist for various publications such as Esquire, Time, Life, Vogue, and Saturday Review.

After the release of his mother's memoir Life with Picasso (1964), Picasso became estranged from his father, who severed ties with him and his younger sister, Paloma Picasso. In 1970, Picasso and his sister filed a lawsuit in France to be recognized as their father's legitimate children, thereby becoming heirs. Eventually, a court decided in favor of Picasso and his sister Paloma in 1974.

His father's legacy was important to him, and he established the Picasso Administration to look after copyright and other legal matters. From 1989 until 2023, Picasso served as the court-appointed administrator of the Picasso estate, where he collaborated with his father's descendants to manage the artist's legacy.

Over the following few decades, the Picasso family would experience a series of internal conflicts. The most heated dispute occurred in 1999 when PSA Peugeot-Citroen unveiled an automobile under Picasso's name after Claude Picasso sold the artist's name and signature. Pablo Picasso’s granddaughter Marina Picasso filed a lawsuit against Claude Picasso, alleging that he had treated "one of the greatest painters, a genius," disrespectfully. When asked about the situation, his attorney told The Guardian: "Claude Ruiz Picasso is recognized by a majority of the five surviving heirs as being perfectly entitled to exploit the Picasso brand name."

Picasso also owned and raced vintage automobiles.

== Death ==
Picasso died on 24 August 2023, at the age of 76, almost three months after his mother's death. He was survived by his wife, Sylvie Vautier, and his sons, Solal and Jasmine.

== Awards ==
Claude Picasso was decorated with the Legion d'Honneur in 2011 for his personal work as photographer, cinematographer, and visual artist, as well as his efforts to administer his father's heritage.
