= Augusta Preitinger =

Dutch painter (1878–1946)

Juliana Augusta van Dongen
- Portrait of Augusta Preitinger by Kees van Dongen, The blue dress, 1911, Van Gogh Museum.
- Born: Juliana Augusta Preitinger; 18 October 1878; Cologne, Germany
- Died: 21 January 1946 (aged 67); Paris, France
- Known for: Painting
- Spouse: Kees van Dongen (m. 1901–1921)

Juliana Augusta "Guus" Preitinger (also known as Guus van Dongen) (18 October 1878 – 21 January 1946) was a German-born Dutch painter who lived most of her adult life in Paris. She married the painter Kees van Dongen, and they had a son, who died as an infant, and a daughter together. They divorced in 1921. She had a career as a modern painter.

== Early life and education ==
Juliana Augusta "Guus" Preitinger was born in 1878 in Cologne. Her family moved to Rotterdam, the Netherlands and became Dutch citizens. When she showed artistic talent as a child, her family encouraged her to get art training.

Preitinger and van Dongen first met as painting students at the art academy in Rotterdam. They decided to move to Paris together, and Preitinger went first to find work.

== Marriage and family ==
They married on 11 July 1901 in Paris. The couple had a son, who died two days after he was born in December 1901. They had a daughter, Augusta, known as "Dolly", born on 18 April 1905. That year, the family moved to an apartment in the Bateau Lavoir in Montmartre, where they were neighbors and became friends with the artist Pablo Picasso and his companion Fernande Olivier.

In 1914, Guus took Dolly to Rotterdam for the summer to see their families. The outbreak of World War I prevented them from returning to Paris until 1918. By then, Kees van Dongen had started a relationship with a married socialite, the fashion director Léa Alvin, also known as Jasmy Jacob. Augusta and Kees divorced in 1921.

== Career ==
Preitinger continued her painting career in Paris and had an exhibit in 1921 at the Galerie Artes. She died in Paris in January 1946.

== Sources ==
- Artprice
- Engers, Rudolf (2002). Het kleurrijke leven van Kees van Dongen. ISBN 978-90-5594-266-4.
