= Otto van Rees (artist) =

Dutch artist (1884–1957)

- Born: 20 April 1884; Freiburg im Breisgau, Germany
- Died: 19 May 1957 (aged 73); Utrecht, Netherlands
- Known for: Painting
- Spouse: Adya Dutilh (m. 1909)

Otto van Rees (April 20, 1884 – May 19, 1957) was a German-born Dutch artist.

== Biography ==
He was born in Freiburg-im-Breisgau, Germany, died in Utrecht, Holland. During his career, he mainly lived in France and Switzerland.

=== Early career ===
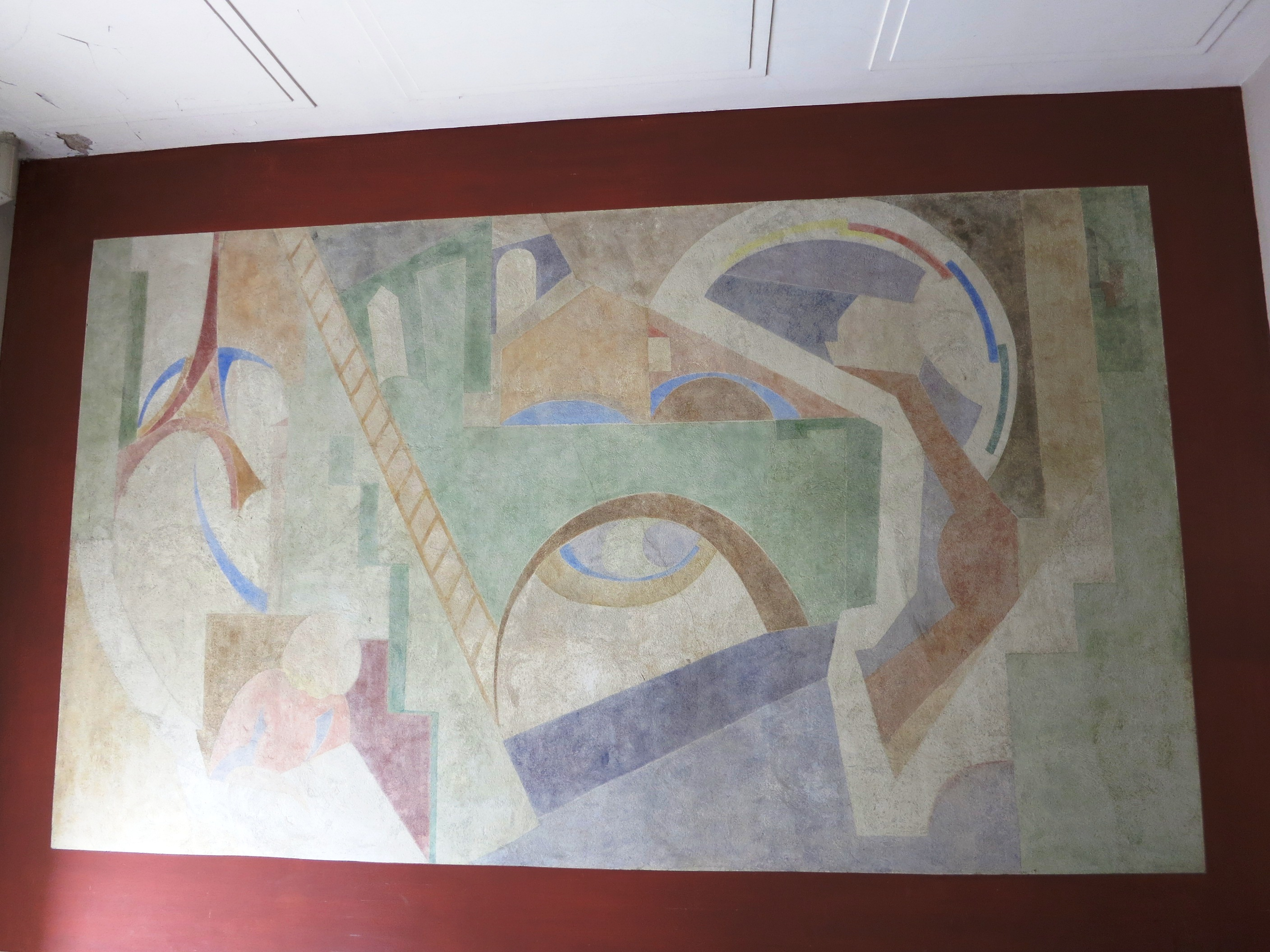
Mural by Otto van Rees in Hottingen

Son of a family of academics, Otto van Rees started his career in Paris, where he moved in October 1904. The year before he had finished high school. By intermediation of Picasso, whom Van Rees met in the café Le Lapin Agile, Van Rees put up at an atelier in the Bateau Lavoir. His wife and fellow artist, Adya Dutilh (1876-1959) joined him in December 1904. The winter of 1904/1905 at the Académie Carrière he became friends with George Braque. The Bateau Lavoir was a lively place where his contact with other artists, painters, Picasso, Lhote, Gris, Van Dongen, as well as writers Max Jacob, Blaise Cendrars, Apollinaire deepened.

Paris would become their winter residence on and off for over 30 years, living at first in different places in Montmartre, later moving to Montparnasse. The summers were spent at Fleury-en-Bière, a little town next to Barbizon. Kees van Dongen spent the summer of 1905 there, together with Otto and Adya van Rees in the farmhouse Van Rees rented. They painted together in the fields around the village. Picasso was probably also a visitor as well as other artists: Otto Freundlich, Marc Chagall and Blaise Cendrars to mention a few. Some of his fellow artists became dear friends over many years: Severini, Segal, Freundlich, Mondriaan, Arp, Zadkine.

=== First exhibitions ===
After a stay in Italy his first grand exhibition of 48 paintings was held in 1908 in Rotterdam at the Oldenzeel gallery, gallery now famous for its exhibitions (1892-1904) of works by Vincent van Gogh. The Dutch public was not used to modernistic paintings and the critics were not positive. Van Rees focused on Paris. In Paris, during the early years, Otto van Rees exhibited his work at the gallery of Berthe Weil; Clovis Sagot and Léonce Rosenberg and at the yearly Salon des Artistes Indépendants. He also had part in the Sonderbund, Cöln, Germany in 1912 and the famous exhibition of Der Sturm in 1913.

=== Cubism ===
In 1912-1916 the art of Van Rees went through changes. His neo-impressionistic experiments to capture sunlight, depth and perspective in color were of the past. He was now concentrating on volume and form. His work evolved from physic cubism, as the art critic Guillaume Apollinaire described it, to analytic cubism. One of the first collectors of his art then was Arthur Jerome Eddy, an American art collector from Chicago.

=== Dada Zürich ===
During the first world war Van Rees changed his French summer residence for Ascona, the Swiss little town at the Lake Maggiore. The artistic and anarchistic colony, where artists, writers, anarchists and philosophers took refuge was inspiring. With Arp, who later spent Christmastime 1915 at the Van Rees, Otto and Adya held the famous exhibition of November 1915 at the gallery Tanner in Zürich. This exhibition is now seen as the beginning of Dada in Zürich. The art dealer Henri Kahnweiler named Van Rees as an artist that brought the collage technique from Paris to Zürich as the start of Dada Art. Ascona would keep Van Rees’ preference. In 1928 Otto van Rees constructed a house in Losone on the hills near Ascona. The house had a ground plan of a circle and a square, announcing the famous 1930 collective art show of Cercle et Carré.

=== Return to Holland ===
After the tragic death of their oldest daughter, killed in a train accident in France, Otto van Rees spent more and more time in Holland. He moved there in 1934. In Holland the young painters called him their Nestor, who taught them the profound values on art. Many public buildings in Holland: churches, railway station, courthouse, ministry, theatres were embellished by his mural paintings.
