= Bateau-Lavoir =

Nickname of Picasso's former home on Montmartre

Coordinates: 48°53′09.24″N 2°20′16.88″E

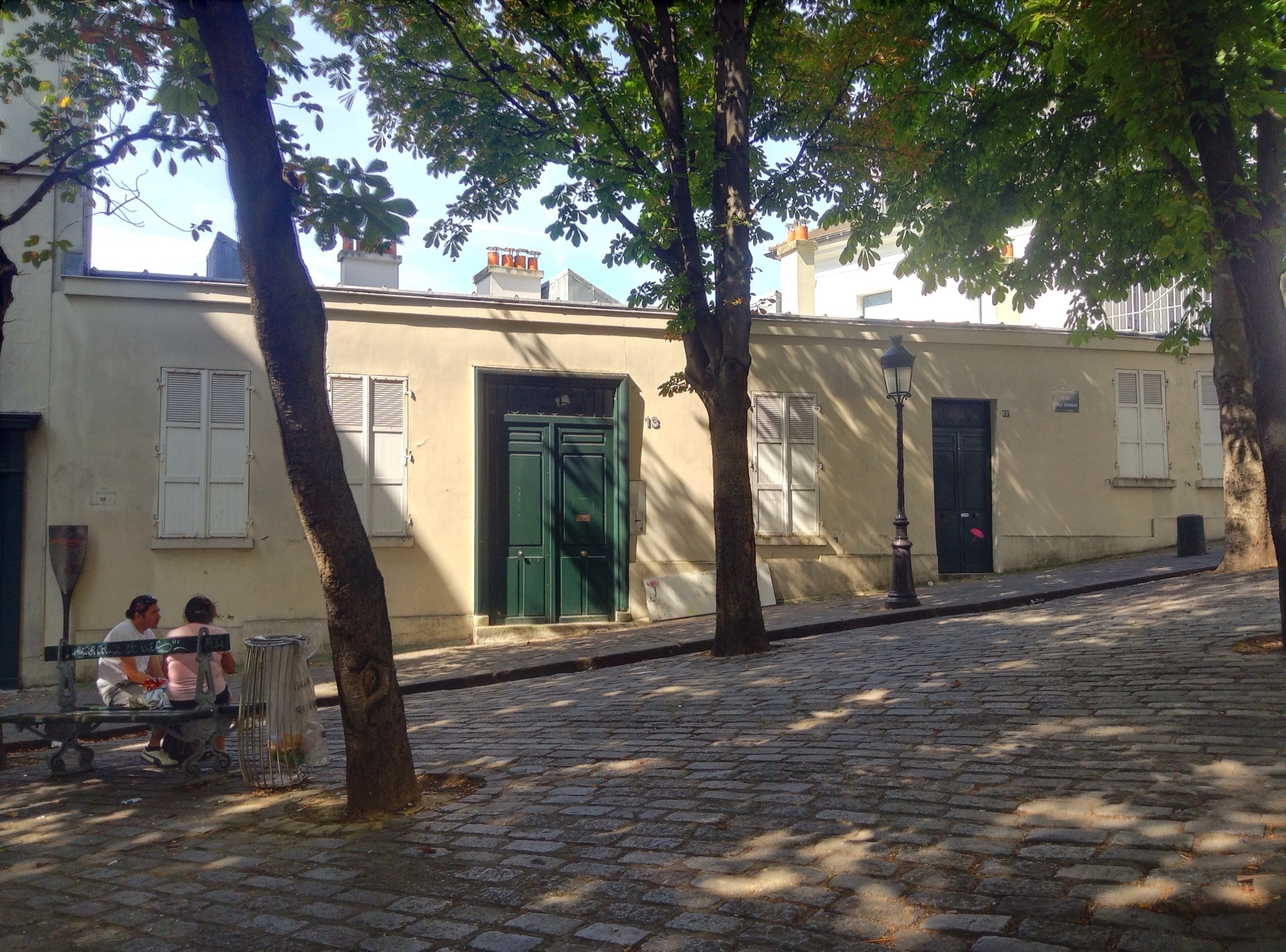
The rebuilt building now on the site of Le Bateau-Lavoir

The Bateau-Lavoir (French pronunciation: [bato lavwaʁ], "Washhouse Boat") is the nickname of a building in the Montmartre district of the 18th arrondissement of Paris that is famous in art history as the residence and meeting place for a group of outstanding early 20th-century artists such as Pablo Picasso, men of letters, theatre people, and art dealers. It is located at No. 13 Rue Ravignan at Place Emile Goudeau, just below the Place du Tertre.

A fire destroyed most of the building in May 1970 and only the façade remained, but it was completely rebuilt in 1978.

== History ==
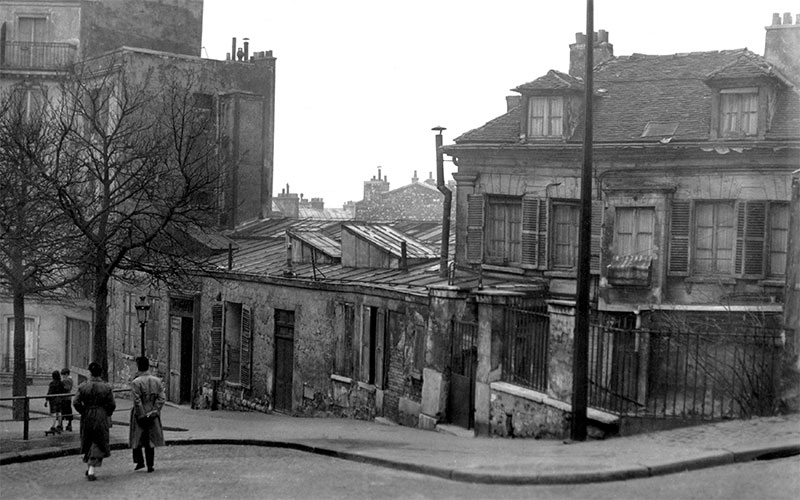
Le Bateau-Lavoir, c. 1910

Formerly a ballroom and piano factory, Bateau Lavoir was squatted and divided into 20 small workshops in 1889. Distributed along a corridor were small unheated rooms that shared a single source of water. The name "Le Bateau-Lavoir" was coined by French poet Max Jacob. The building was dark and dirty, almost seeming to be a scrap pile rather than a dwelling. On stormy days, it swayed and creaked, reminding people of washing-boats on the Seine River, hence the name.

The building stands on a small cobblestone square that was known as Place Ravignan. In 1911, it was rechristened Place Émile Goudeau for Émile Goudeau (1849–1906), a popular novelist, poet, and journalist who founded Les Hydropathes, a renowned and famous literary club. The square now has a Wallace fountain and is planted with horse chestnut trees.

Maxime Maufra (1863–1918) was the first noted artist to take up residence in Bateau-Lavoir, around 1890. Kees van Dongen and Pablo Picasso took up residence between 1900 and 1904. After 1904 more artists and writers moved in, including Otto van Rees, Amedeo Modigliani, Pierre Mac Orlan, Juan Gris, André Salmon, Pablo Gargallo, Max Jacob, Luigi Corbellini, and Pierre Reverdy.

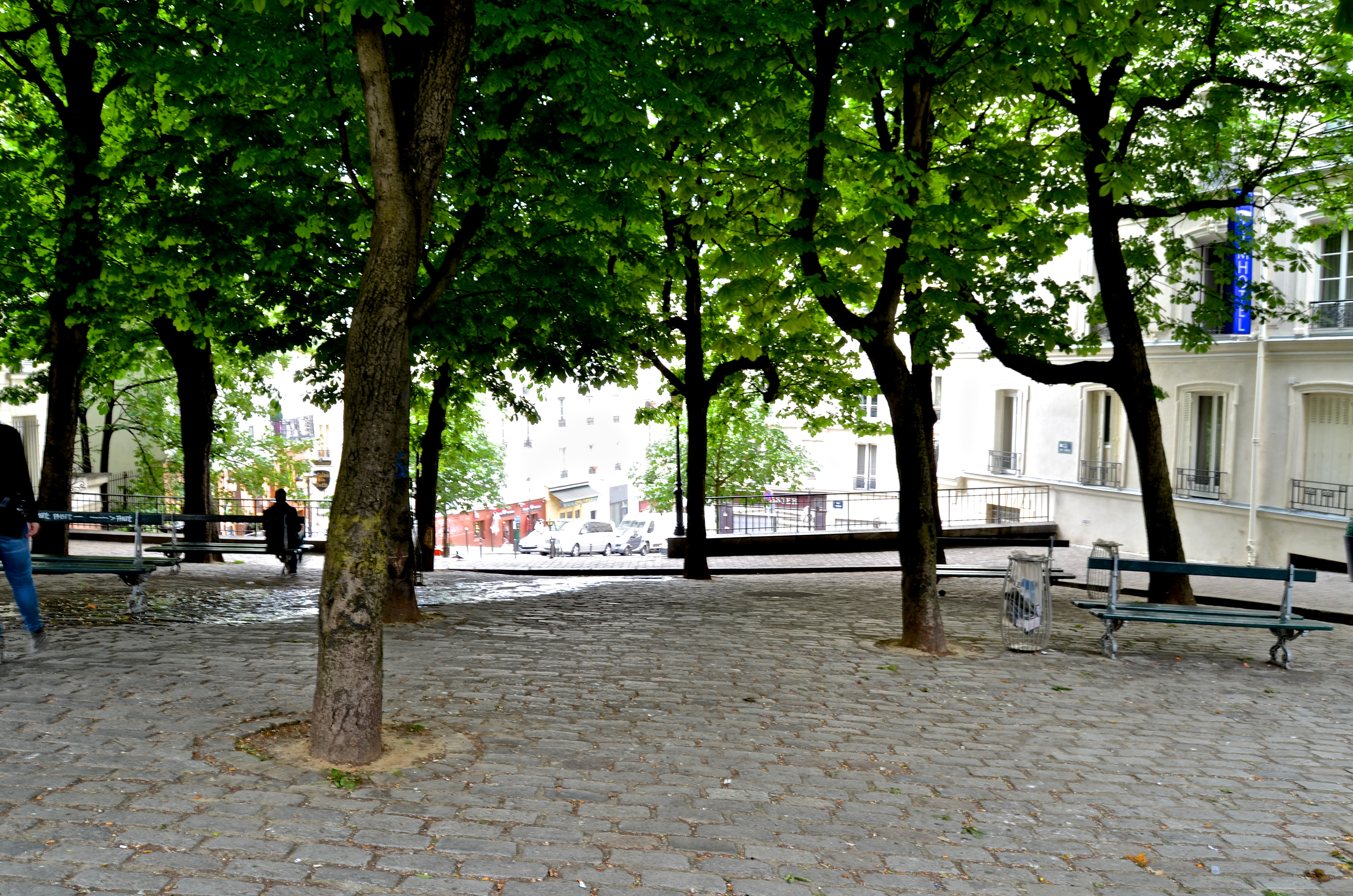
Place Émile Goudeau in the 18th arrondissement of Paris

It became an unofficial club that included artists Henri Matisse, Georges Braque, André Derain, Raoul Dufy, Marie Laurencin, Amedeo Modigliani, Jean-Paul Laurens, Maurice Utrillo, Jacques Lipchitz, María Blanchard, Jean Metzinger and Louis Marcoussis; writers Guillaume Apollinaire, Alfred Jarry, Jean Cocteau, Gustave Coquiot, Cremnitz (Maurice Chevrier), Paul Fort, André Warnod, Raymond Radiguet, and Gertrude Stein; actors Charles Dullin, Harry Baur, and Gaston Modot; and art dealers Ambroise Vollard, Clovis Sagot, Daniel-Henry Kahnweiler, and Berthe Weill.

While residing at the Bateau-Lavoir, Picasso painted works such as Young Girl with a Flower Basket, and Garçon à la pipe (Boy with a Pipe) in 1905, and one of his most noted works, Les Demoiselles d'Avignon in 1907, considered by art historians as a proto-Cubist painting (the precursor of a movement that became known as Cubism).

Following the outbreak of World War I in 1914, creative artists living at the Bateau-Lavoir and in the neighbourhood began moving elsewhere, mainly to Montparnasse.

== Notable residents ==
- Guillaume Apollinaire
- Georges Braque
- Jose De Creeft
- Luigi Corbellini
- Tibor Csernus
- Kees van Dongen
- Otto Freundlich
- Pablo Gargallo
- Juan Gris
- Auguste Herbin
- Max Jacob
- Marie Laurencin
- Pierre Mac Orlan
- Maxime Maufra
- Ksenia Milicevic
- Igor Mitoraj
- Amedeo Modigliani
- Fernande Olivier
- Pablo Picasso
- Augusta Preitinger
- Adya van Rees-Dutilh
- Otto van Rees
- Pierre Reverdy
- Endre Rozsda
- André Salmon
- Ardengo Soffici

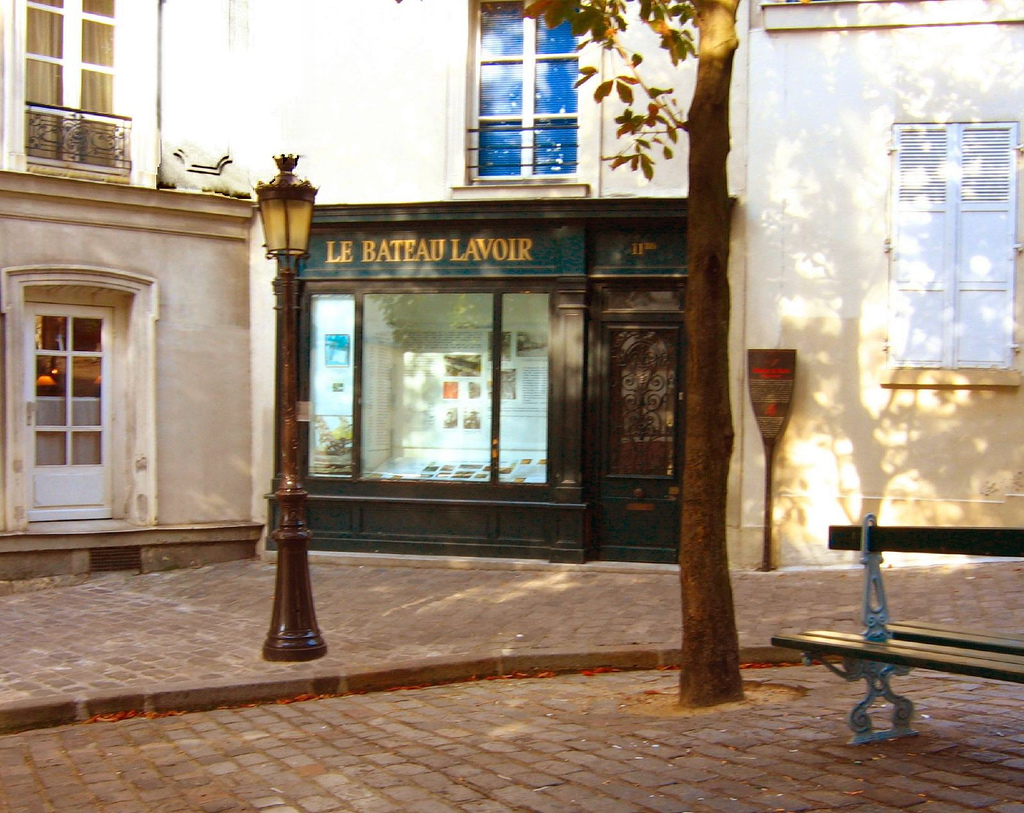
Bateau-Lavoir 2005

== Notable events ==
In 1908, a celebration banquet for Henri Rousseau was organised in Picasso's studio in the Bateau-Lavoir.

One night, Amedeo Modigliani destroyed a number of his friends' paintings while in an alcoholic rage in the Bateau-Lavoir, according to memoirs of his daughter, Jeanne.

== In popular culture ==
The Le Bateau-Lavoir is a featured setting in the 2018 season of Genius, which focuses on the life and art of Pablo Picasso.

It is also featured in the 1995 Éric Rohmer film Les Rendez-vous de Paris.

It also appears in episode 9 of season 5 of the series Emily in Paris.

== See also ==
- La Ruche, in Montparnasse, Paris
