= Endre Rozsda =

Hungarian-French painter

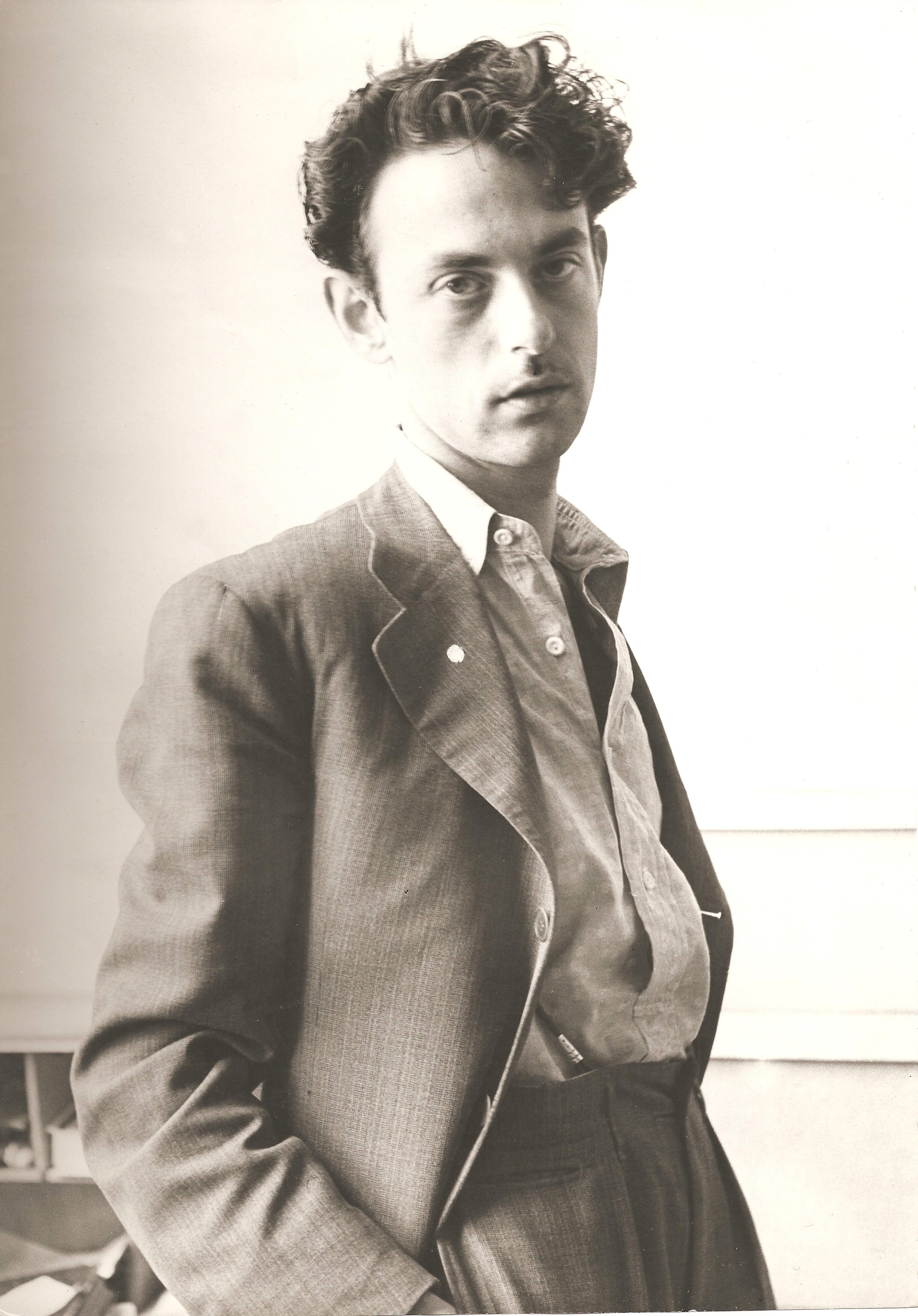
- Endre Rozsda
- Born: 18 November 1913; Mohács, Austria-Hungary
- Died: 16 September 1999 (aged 85); Paris, France
- Known for: Painting, drawing, photography
- Movement: Surrealism, lyrical abstraction
- Awards: Copley Prize, 1964

Endre Rozsda (Hungarian: Rozsda Endre; 18 November 1913, Mohács – 16 September 1999, Paris) was a Hungarian-French painter.

== Life ==
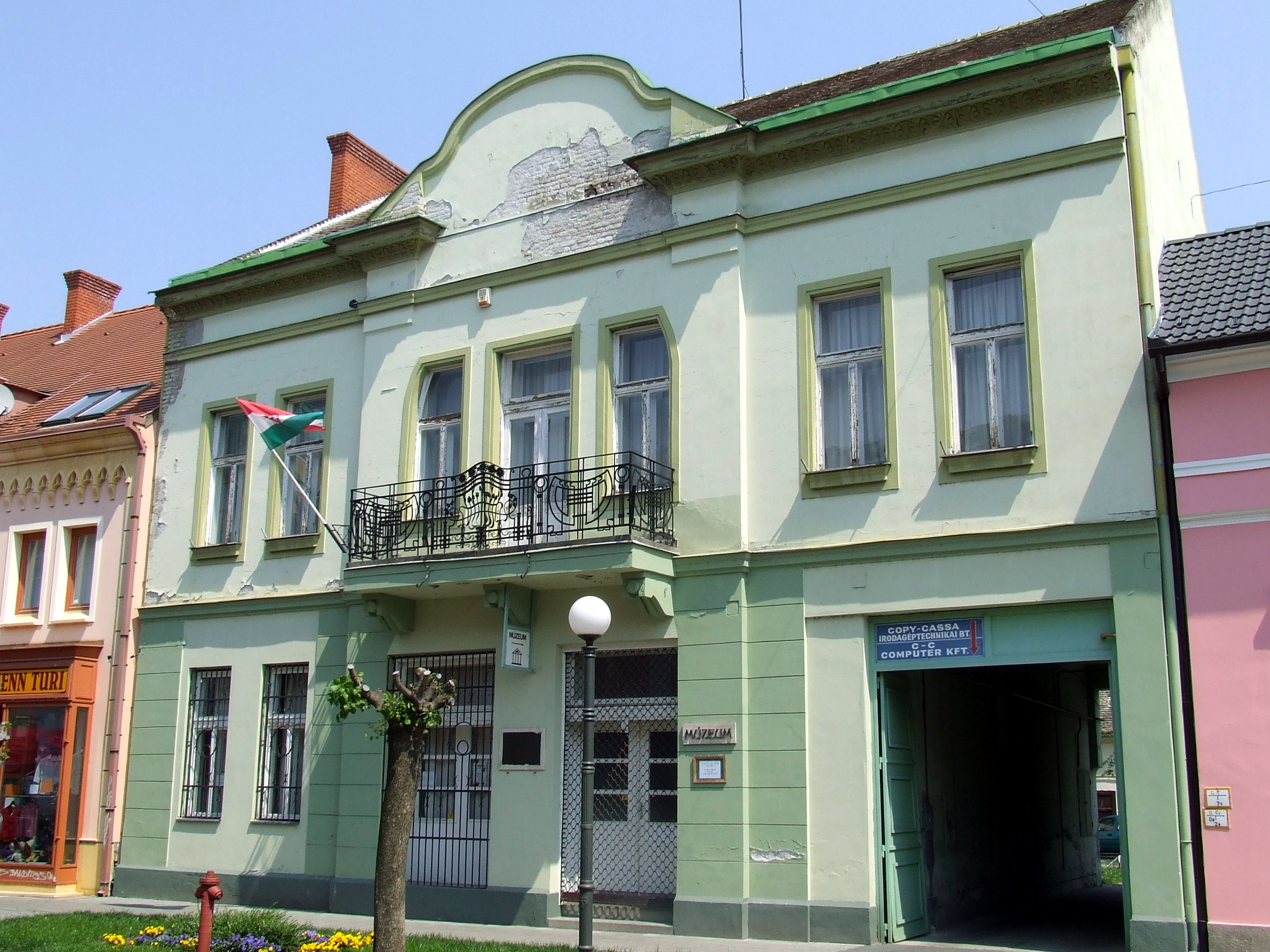
The family home in Mohács

Endre Rozsda was born in Mohács, a small city along the Danube in Hungary. His childhood memories marked his entire artistic work. The creative method he developed helped him to conjure a unique surrealistic world based on his memories:

Out of memory and light I weave a dense fabric. I look steadily at it until it comes to life and stares back at me, until it rises up in front of me. It's time that I want to get hold of, arrange and evaluate. Time is that bright, multi-colored oblivion where joys and sufferings turn into precious beads. Around time's beads I twist the ivy of my own memories. I don't want to assess or explain anything. I want to understand. I lay my head against time and listen to what it tells me.

Rejecting his family's plans for a career, he decided to become a painter at an early age. He acquired the basic skills of the trade in the school of Vilmos Aba-Novák. His first solo exhibition, held in the 'Tamás' gallery at age 23 (1936), was a great success. Critics praised his work and the Museum of Fine Arts, Budapest bought one of his paintings. "Rozsda is a stunning major talent. Few have ever painted old women and beggars the way he does. … In some of his beautiful images a veil of fog and light is woven, turning reality into a melodic chimera", a critic writing for Est praised the young painter.

His early artistic period, closely tied to Hungarian post-impressionism, came to an end after attending a Béla Bartók concert. His early successes notwithstanding, after listening to Bartók he came to understand that "I am not my own contemporary". With sculptor Lajos Barta, he moved to Paris (1938), where he continued his studies at the École de Louvre. There he befriended Árpád Szenes, Vieira da Silva and Françoise Gilot (later Picasso's companion for a decade) who became his student for a while. He also became acquainted with Max Ernst and Alberto Giacometti. His thinking underwent fundamental change and came closer to Surrealism. Following the German occupation, he was forced to return to Budapest (1943) where his unique surrealistic style fully matured (Sacred and Profane Love, 1947; Musée des Beaux-Arts de Dijon).

After the war, he played an active role in the establishment of the European School and showed his work regularly in group shows. According to art historian, Krisztina Passuth, Endre Rozsda was one of the most prominent figures of the European School. In 1948 the group disbanded because the new regime did not tolerate abstract surrealist art. In the next few years Rozsda worked on book illustrations, painted in secret and, obviously, could not show his work in public.

Following the suppression of the Hungarian Revolution of 1956 he permanently returned to France. He came into contact with Raymond Queneau and André Breton, who wrote an introduction for his exhibition at the ‘Furstenberg’ Gallery (1957). He participated in the International Exhibition of Surrealism in Milan (1961). A few years later he won the Copley-Prize (1964) from a jury composed of Hans Arp, Roberto Matta, Max Ernst, Man Ray, Roland Penrose, Sir Herbert Read and Marcel Duchamp.

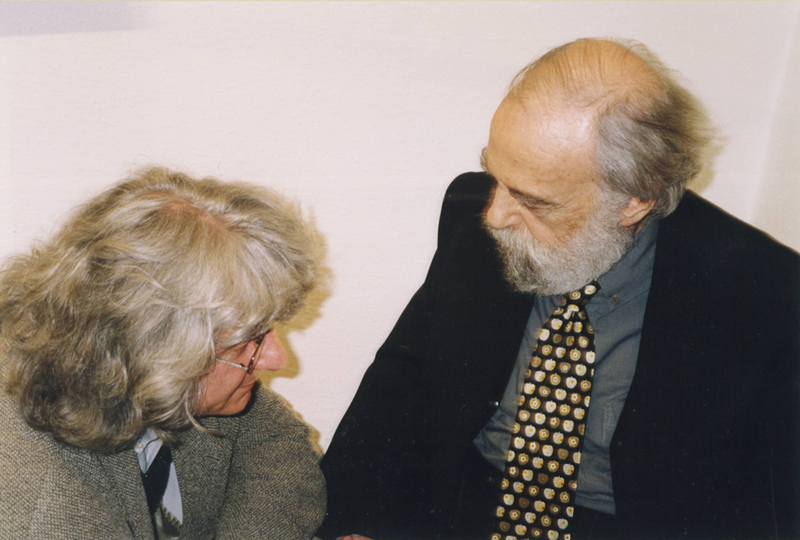
Endre Rozsda and Péter Esterházy at an opening in Várfok Gallery

From the start of the 1960s, Rozsda's work underwent another change: the tensions and harmonies of architectonic structures and swirling colors created a richly detailed microcosm. In his effort "to control time" and dissolve reality in his imagination he continued to rely on Surrealism, although his means of expression became increasingly characterized by lyrical abstraction.

In 1970 he became a French citizen. In 1979 he set up a studio in Le Bateau-Lavoir and continued to work there until the end of his life.

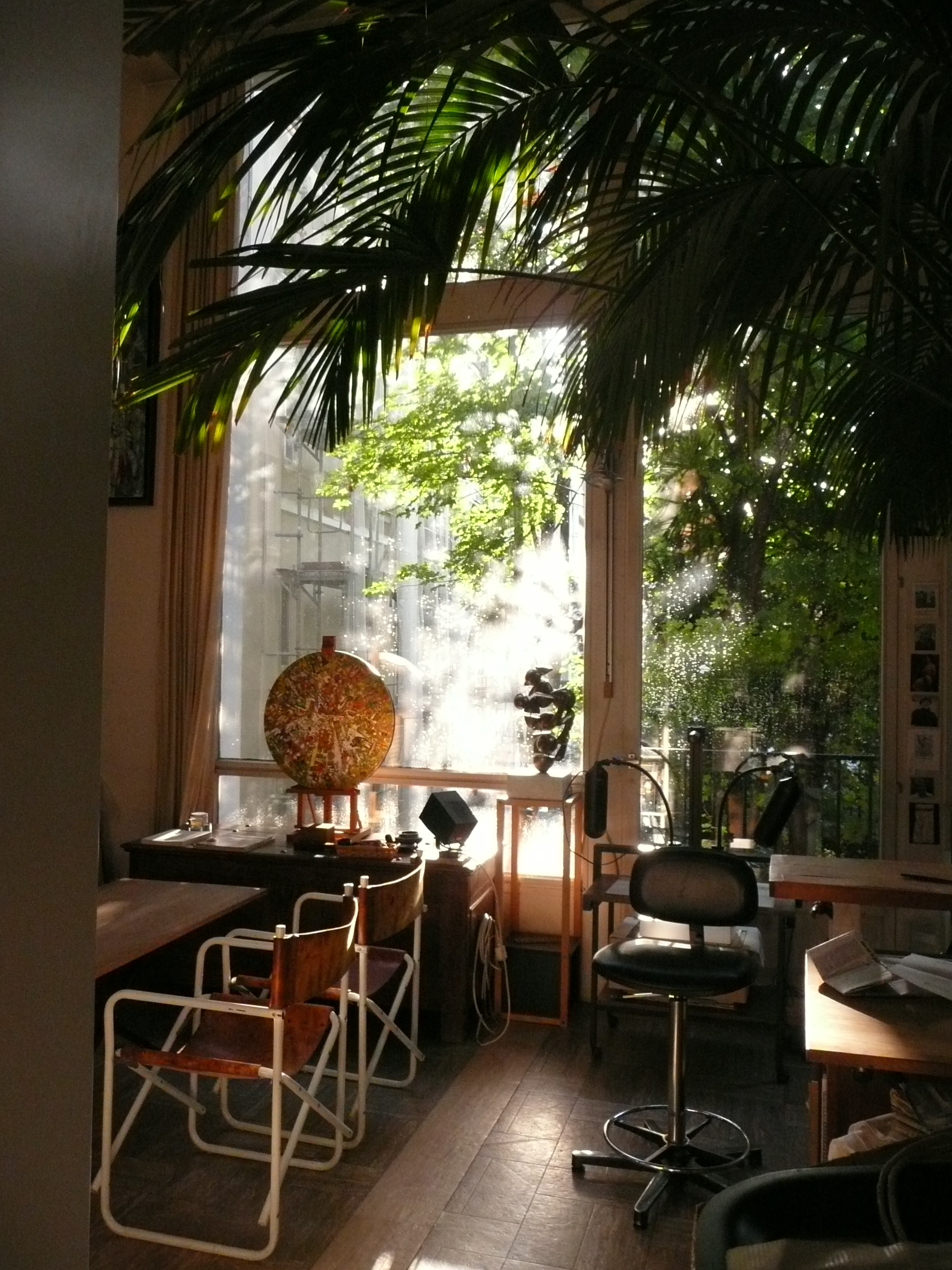
Endre Rozsda's studio at Bateau-Lavoir, a famous Parisian artists' commune.

The last exhibition he attended in person was held in Várfok Gallery and opened by the writer Péter Esterházy (1999):

Just like nature itself, these pictures are difficult to disclose. They necessitate absorbed looking, long and silent. (What doesn't…) And still, they speak at the first glance. They obviously don't say the same thing, but they seem to have a common melodic structure. And this common melodic structure – I may be wrong, and once more abusively speak only about myself – is rather anachronistic, does not conform with their time: it seems that Rozsda's pictures say that the world is beautiful. Maybe this is precisely surrealism. Surrealism as ethical attitude?" ... I'd like to wrap my books into these canvases, they would feel good in there.

Rozsda is buried in Montmartre Cemetery, Paris.

== From post-Impressionism to Surrealism (1932–1937) ==
Endre Rozsda recalled the beginnings as follows: "I started to learn painting in the Free School of Aba-Novák. I became his apprentice. This was the most important artistic and human experience in all my life. It was a great stroke of luck that I learned painting outside the Academy of Fine Arts were training was extremely academic at the time. Aba-Novák was a good painter, although far from revolutionary. He had a rich and free personality."

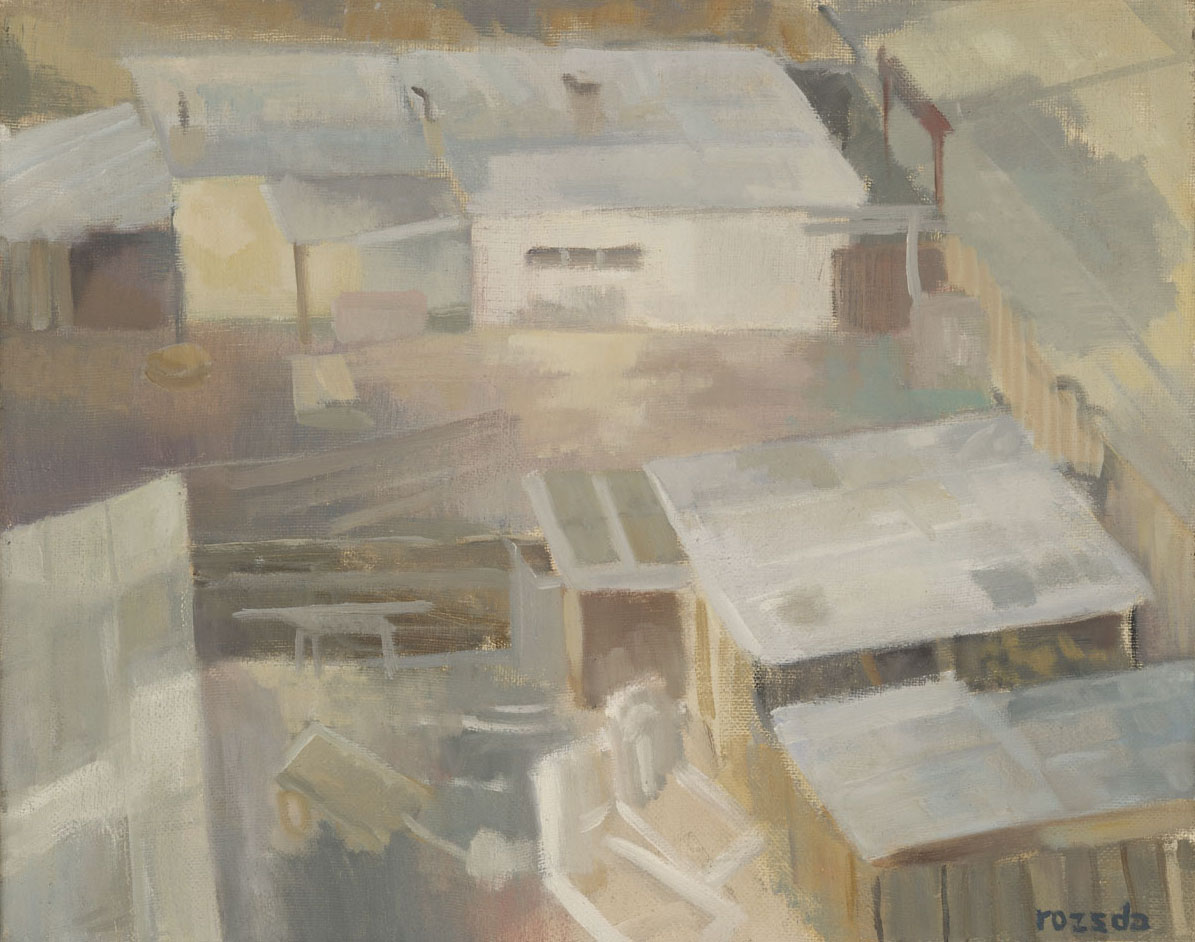
Playground – The Paul Street boys (1934)

Aba-Novák and Rozsda often painted in plein air. Next to his master, he also worked on frescoes decorating churches and public monuments.

His paintings from that time are defined by a sensibility informed by post-Impressionism. Initially, he painted landscapes bathed in mystical and subtle sunlight, as well as thinly painted portraits composed with large color patches. For some time, instead of distancing himself from naturalistic representation, he looked for the next stage of development and a personal vision by applying bold cropping and, after pastel-soft landscapes, by creating at times gloomy and melancholic, at times vigorous and vibrant still lives. Wispy colors were gradually taken over by expressive deep reds, yellows and purples to create tensions. A sensitive representation of everyday objects and people were replaced by suggestive forms painted with a broad brush.

He had his first solo show in the middle of this period in the Tamás Gallery, with a dedication written by Aba-Novák. The Budapest daily Pesti Napló said of Rozsda:

He's all but 22 years old and astonishingly talented. Full of energy, subtle tensions, a healthy dose of pride and a keen appetite for experimentation … Clearly, he had excellent schooling: under the tutelage of Aba-Novák he acquired professional skills of the highest order. He draws, paints, models and composes with supreme confidence and clears the initial obstacles of exhilarating and wild exploits with apparent ease. His master is right to claim that Rozsda's developed pictorial vision belies his age.

His style differed from contemporary academic trends and the avant-garde. During this period, he encountered artistic influences that affected his subsequent work and thematic approach.

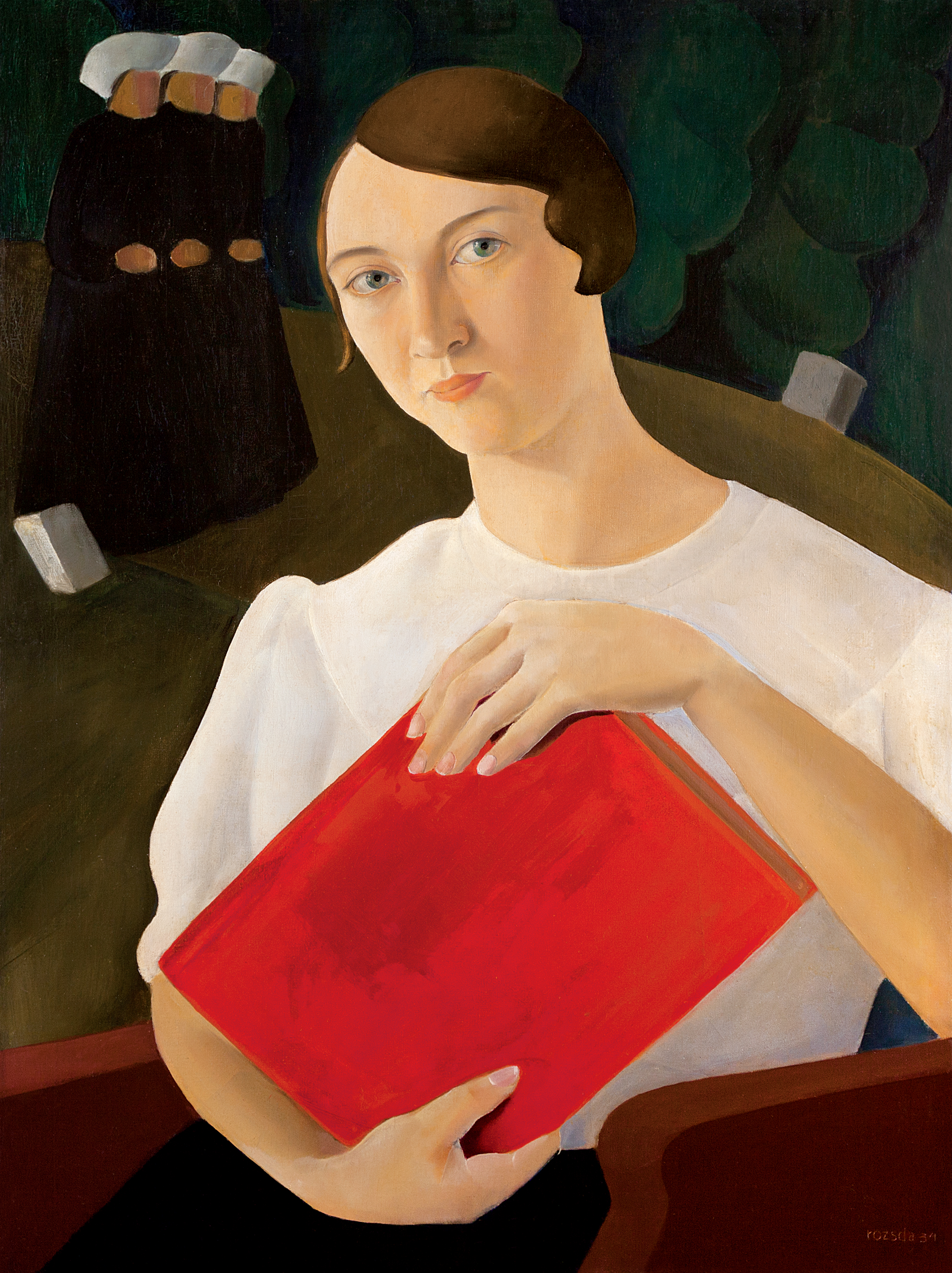
Marianne (1934)

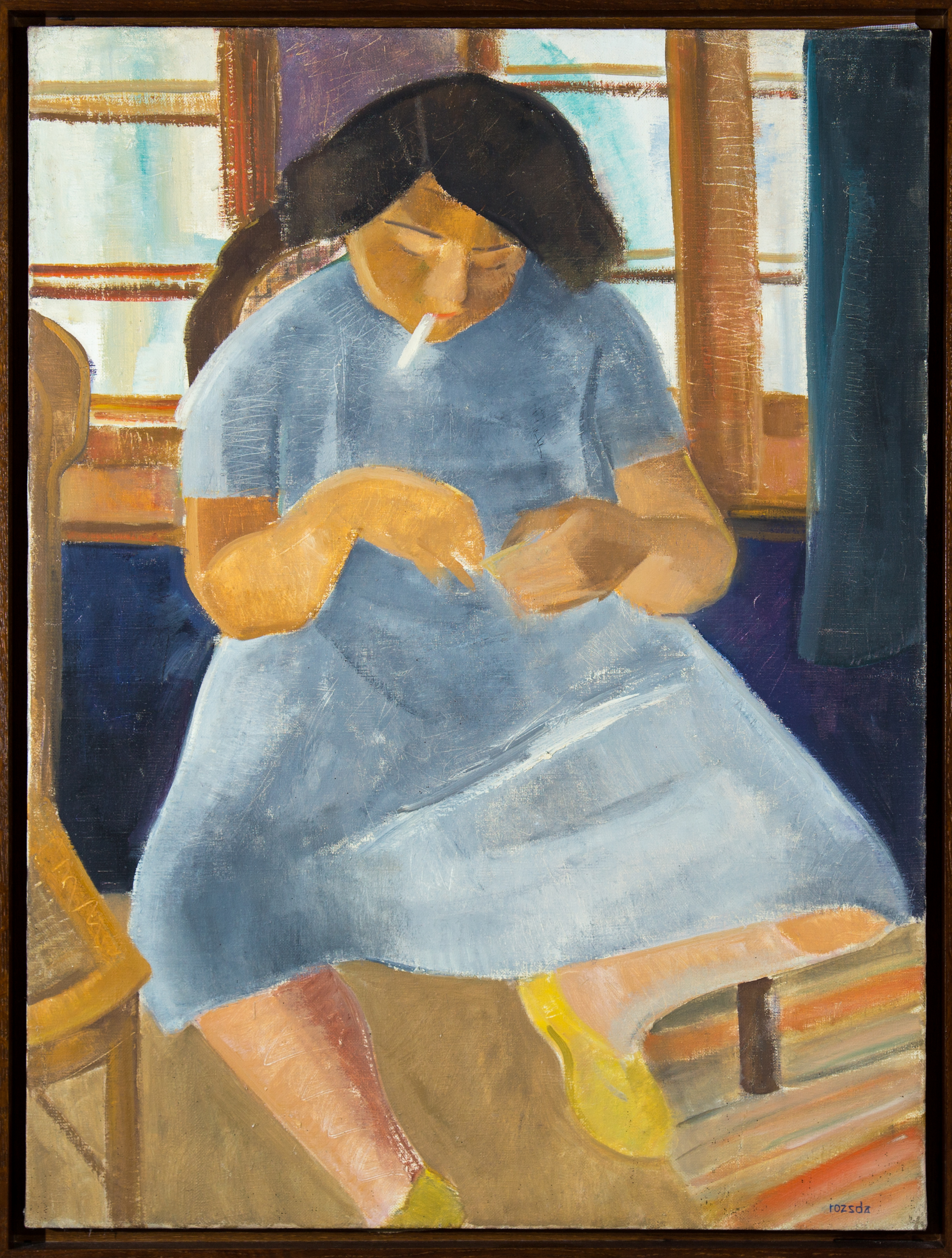
Girl smoking (around 1934)

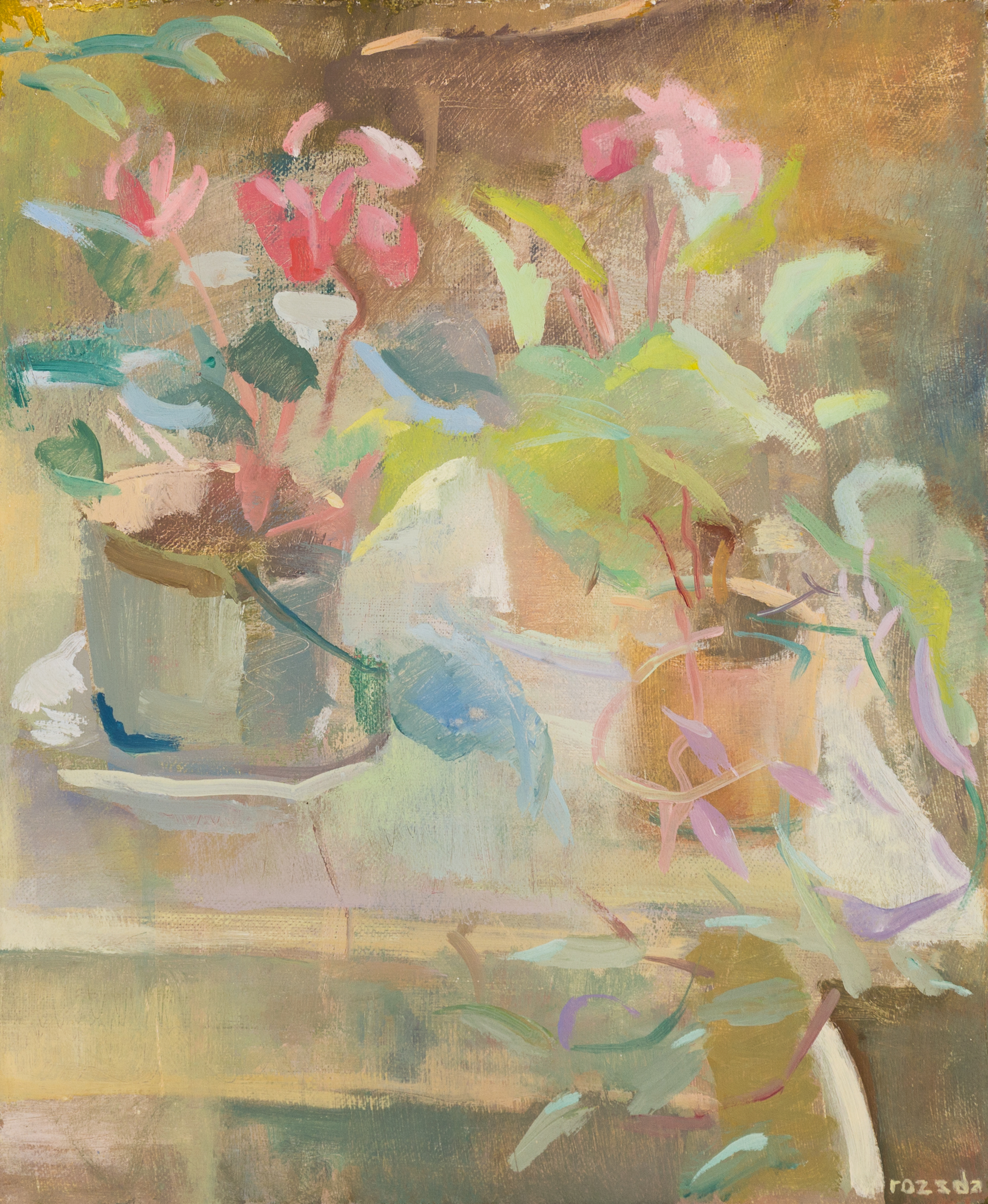
Cyclamen (1935)

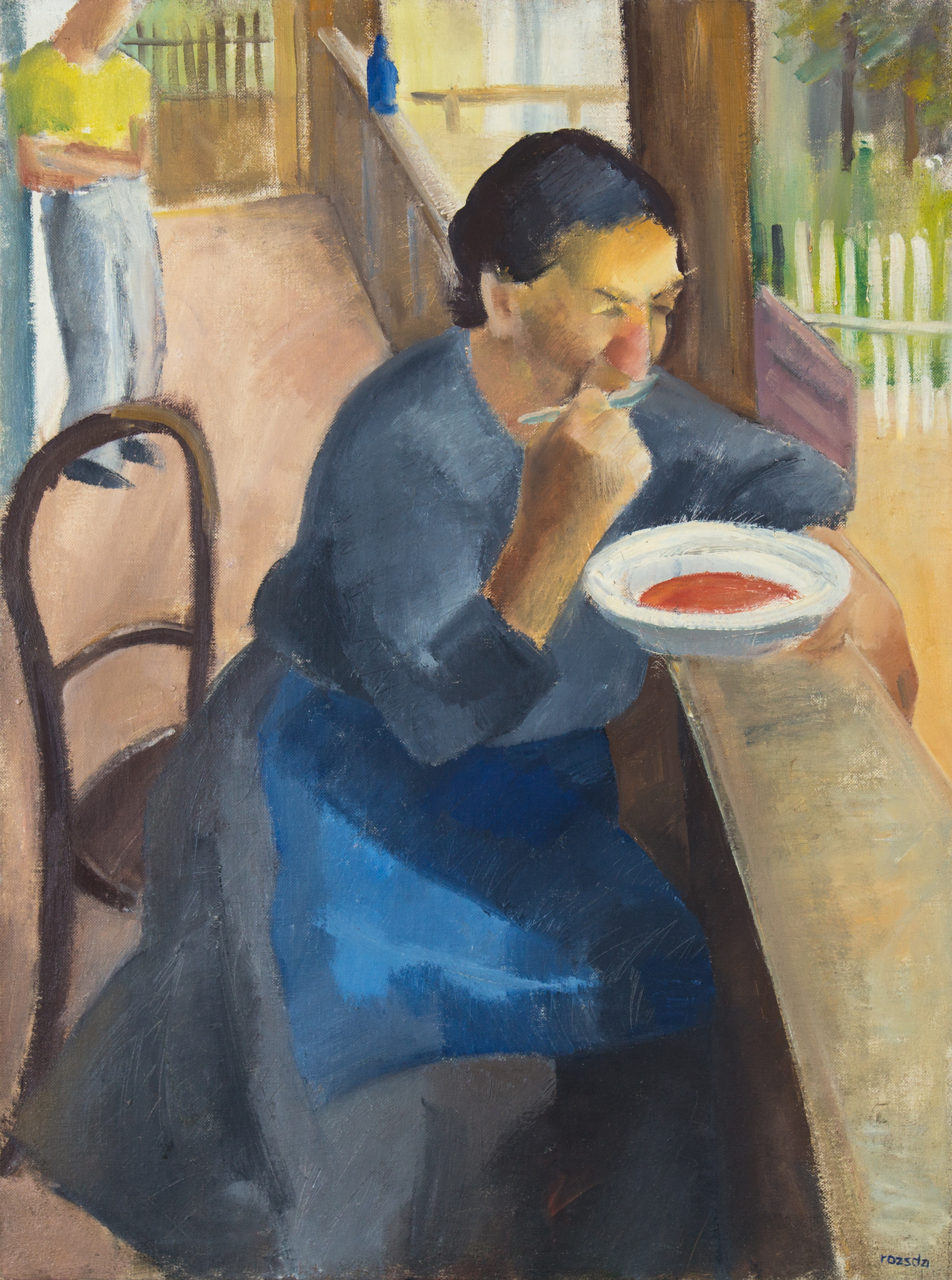
Lunch on the porch (1935)

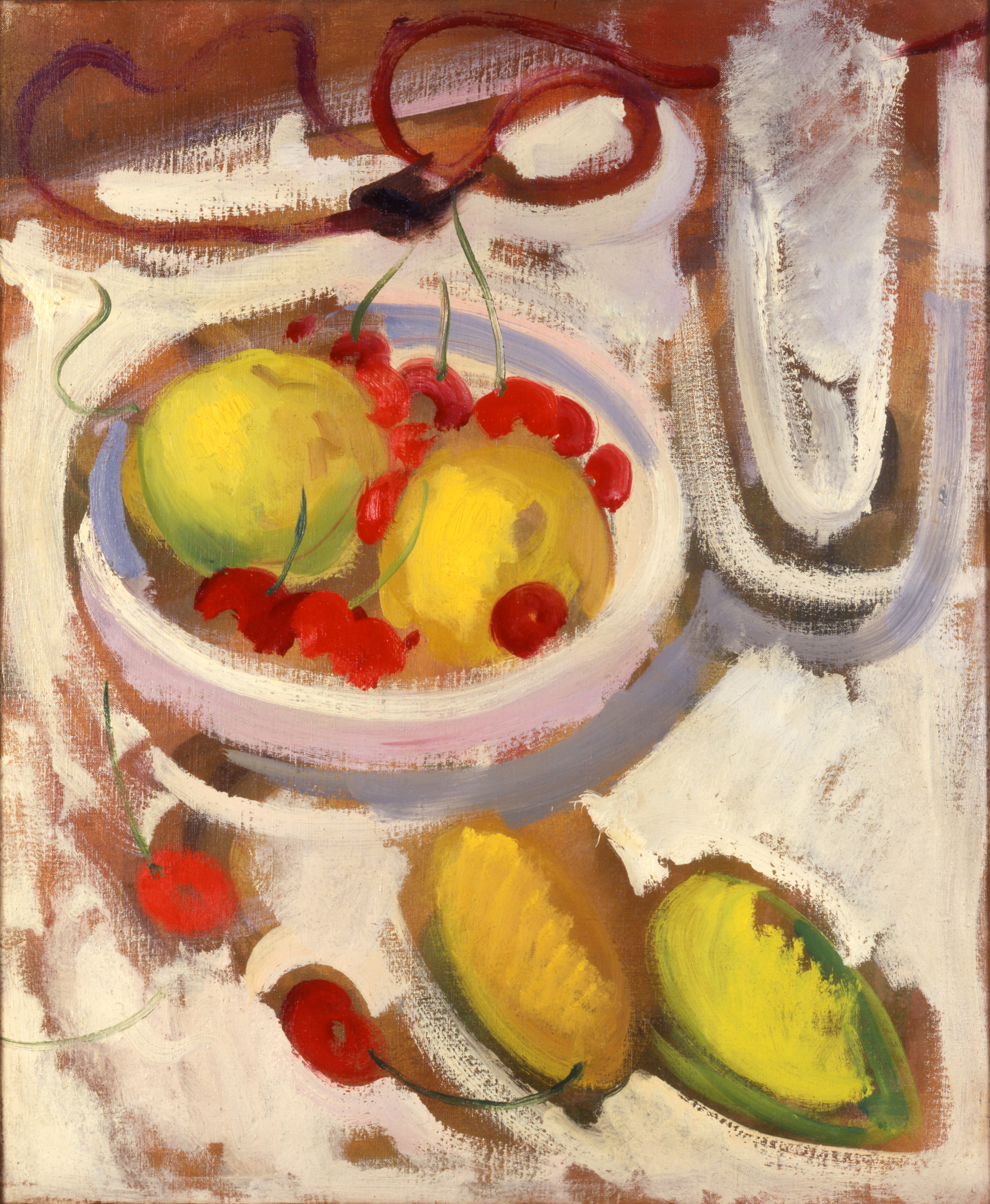
Apples and cherries (1938)

== The turn to surrealism (1938–1944) ==
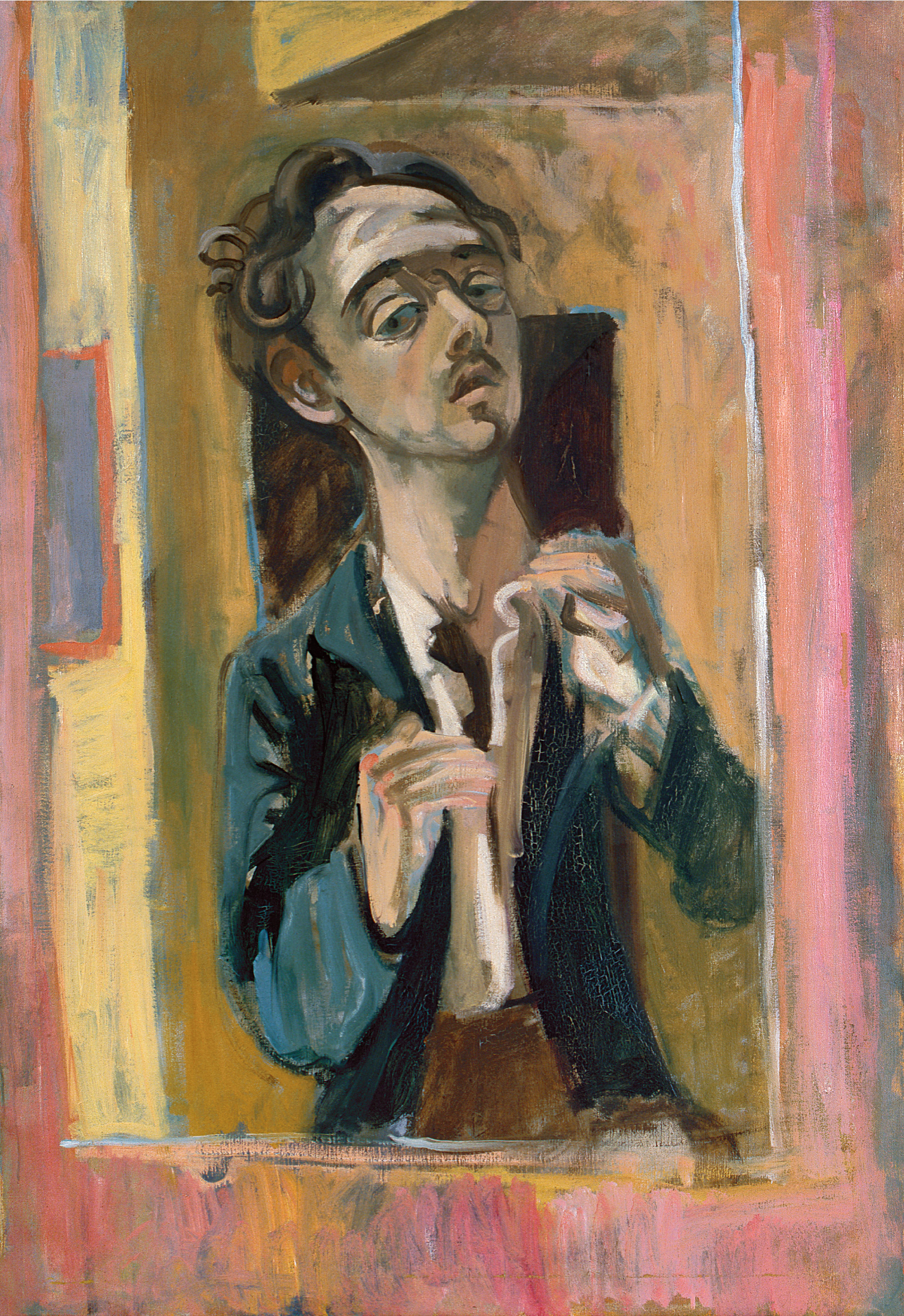

This is how Rozsda recalled this shift: "By pure coincidence, just before my trip to Paris I met two painters, a couple: Imre Ámos and Margit Anna. I had no program for the night. They invited me to a concert at the Academy of Music. ‘Bartók is performing tonight’, they said. Bartók was just a name for me. I had no idea who he was. (...) Bartók played one of his own pieces with his wife: Sonata composed for two pianos and percussions, I believe one of the most important works of the 20th century. It was a world premiere. Where I sat, I had an excellent view of Bartók's hands. I was mesmerized. I had never thought there was music outside of Bach, Mozart and Mussorgsky. I became completely drunk on that music. (...) I understood immediately that I am not my own contemporary."

Endre Rozsda encountered a number of new impulses in the French capital. "After arriving in Paris, I devoured everything that came my way", he said later. With the sculptor, Lajos Barta, he rented a studio on Montparnasse. Finding himself in the vibrant café culture of the late 1930s, soon he made the acquaintance of people who helped him become his "own contemporary". An experimental and self-searching period followed, and in just a few years he left post-Impressionism behind and adopted a nonfigurative style.

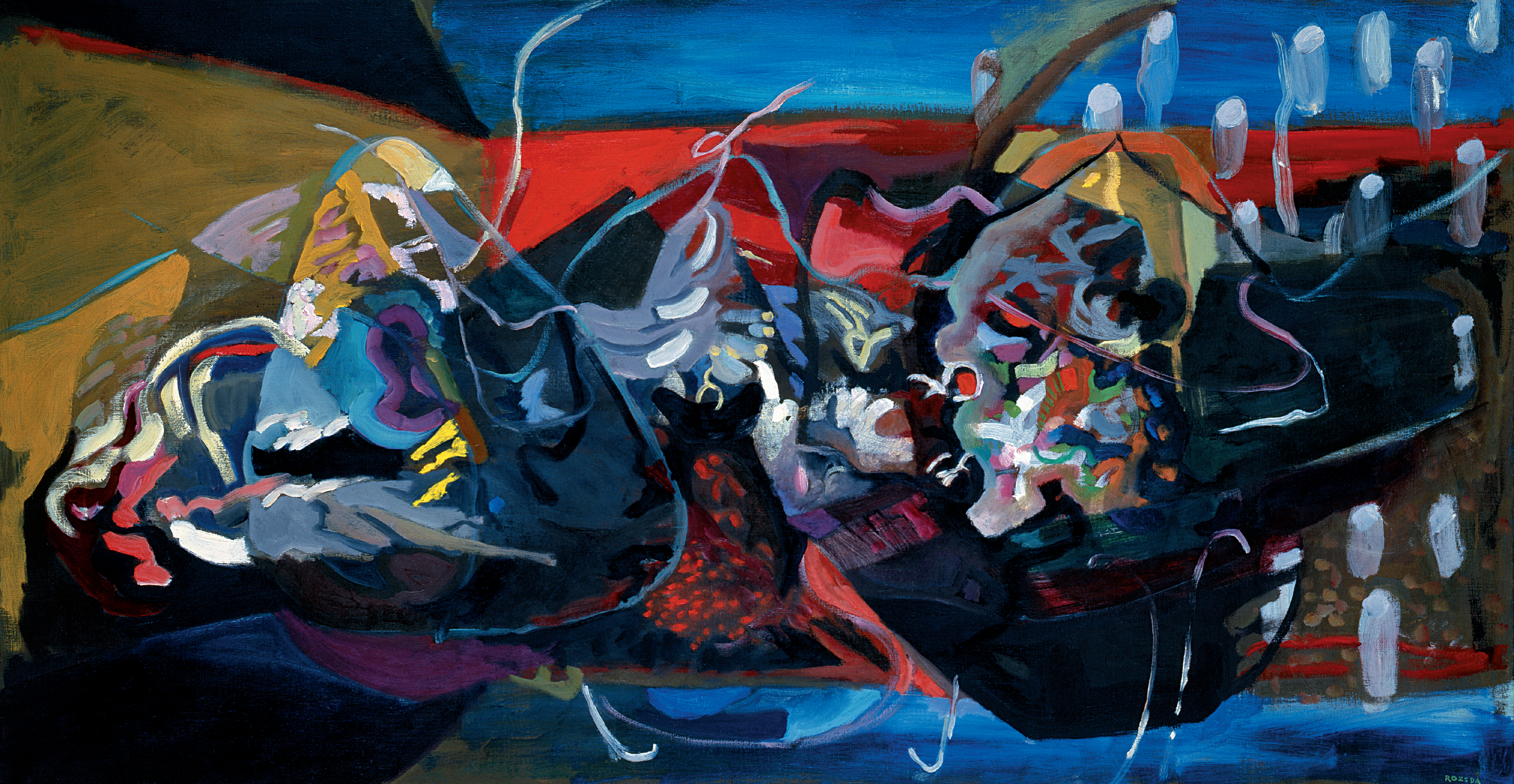
The King of truth (1942)

This process is well illustrated by his work from that time where figurative representation was gradually replaced by abstraction: Two persons alone (1939), Emperor on the throne (1939–40), Apple bed (1942), A glass of water watches over the birth of a caterpillar (1943), The King of truth (1942).

While he did not join any group of artists, his thinking and temperament drew him close to the surrealists. Rozsda's painting style, developed to bring memories back to the surface and show the hidden connections of the mind, had a strong affinity with the surrealist project and surrealist creative techniques.

After he was forced to leave France following the German occupation (1943) his surrealist painting became fully matured in Budapest. By that time Hungary was at war, new laws disenfranchised Hungarian Jews and the majority of society supported extremist political forces and ideologies. Endre Rozsda's mother was deported in 1944 and he went into hiding to escape persecution. Years earlier he already lost his adored father, who had committed suicide during the great depression.

Surely, personal tragedies and the experienced horrors hardened his resolve to discover worlds not dominated by historical forces and the laws of nature, but instead by the powers of imagination. In his pictures painted in those years time envelopes, as in a fabric teeming with life, the fossilized forms of reality transformed deep in the subconscious. The horrors of war also appeared on his canvases: Death dance (1946-1947), My first steps in hell (1947), Returning ghost (1951), Martyred children in paradise (1958). "Images saturated with incandescent and dark colors reflecting Rozsda’s existential anguish and the historical drama which surrounded him" Françoise Gilot said, who also believed that this period represented Endre Rozsda's “real descent to Hell”.

== European School (1945–1948) ==
In pre-war Hungary few people showed interest in abstract and surrealist art. When, after returning from Paris in 1943, Rozsda showed his work, critics were confused. "Yet another abstract show. Not long ago, involving an exhibition in ‘Alkotás Művészház’, we gave a cursory overview of abstraction, i.e., an art form devoid of any sense of reality and the pastime of a bygone generation", one of them wrote.

In this climate a few artists decided to establish a new grouping with the primary objective of adopting contemporary European artistic trends and presenting them to the Hungarian public. In the euphoria following liberation and the hope of a new start after the war they were free to give public lectures, create art and put on regular shows.

"Rozsda was one of the most prominent figures of the European School born in 1945", art historian, Krisztina Passuth wrote. Looking at his treatment of space and the picture plane, Passuth also drew a parallel between the creative approaches of Rozsda and Max Ernst. In her view that was all the more interesting as in those years they had not seen each other's work. "Rozsda's compositions appear to be covered by tiny fluffs, feathers or extremely thin veils. The swirling, disintegrating and then recombining motifs and particles work through their motion, there are no exact contours, there is no beginning or end", she wrote.

Other reviews also point out that in this period of his career Rozsda's paintings were characterized by a staggering proliferation of themes, bordering on the psychedelic. We may be witnessing the first moments of the birth of new universes or, conversely, the vanishing of ancient galaxies: Milky Way (1945), Flying (1946), My grandmother's lorgnette (1947).

The philosopher, Béla Hamvas may have referred to these visions when he pointed out: "Among our contemporary and young surrealist painters, Endre Rozsda's work offers the richest realization of this artistic movement. (...) To date, two hot spots have emerged in his works: one is an erotic dream fantasy and the other, closely related focal point is something that can only be described vaguely with a universal metaphor. It could be best characterized as a unique adventure/knight/troubadour world with mindboggling variability and dizzying rush of events".

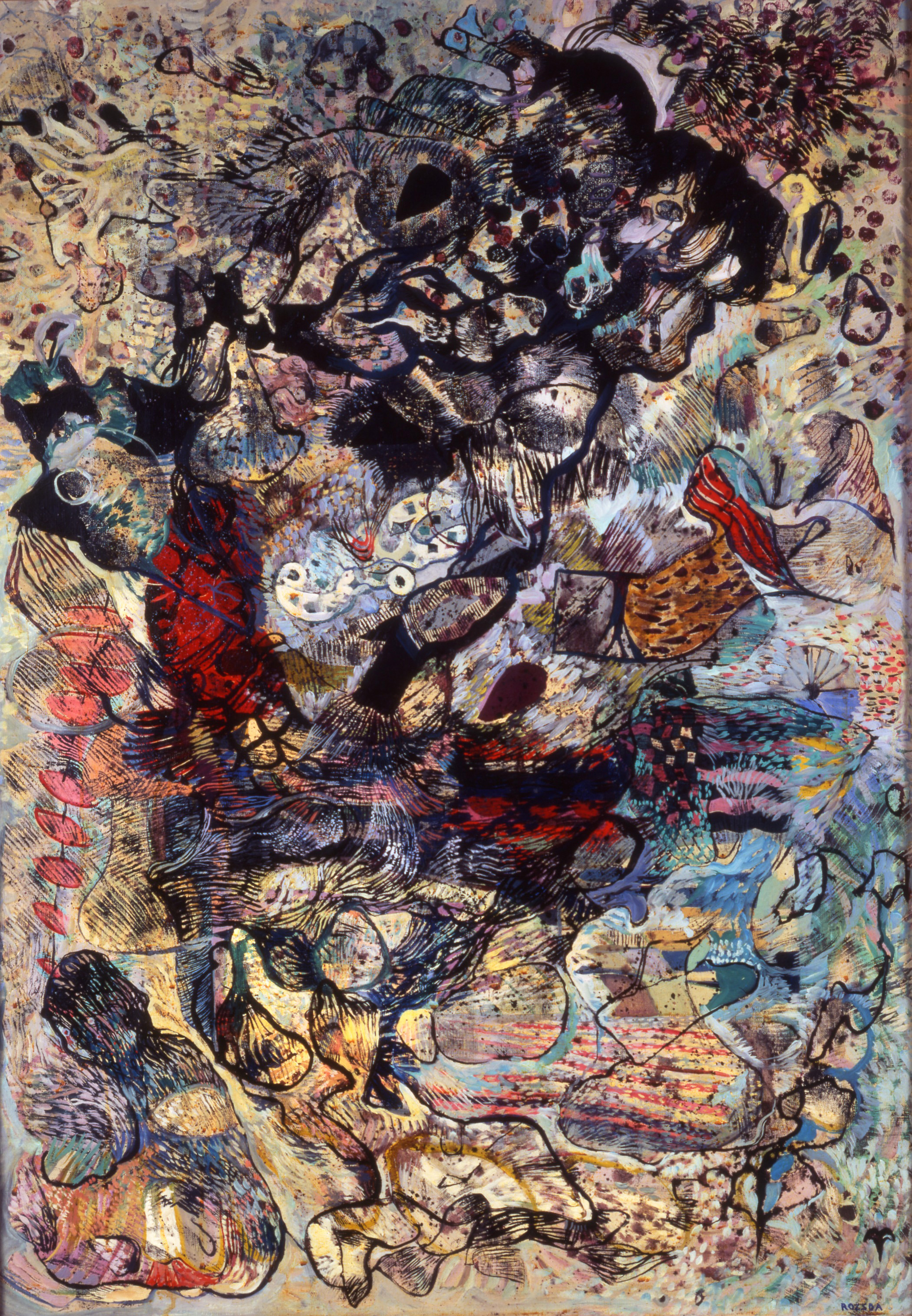
Flying (1946)

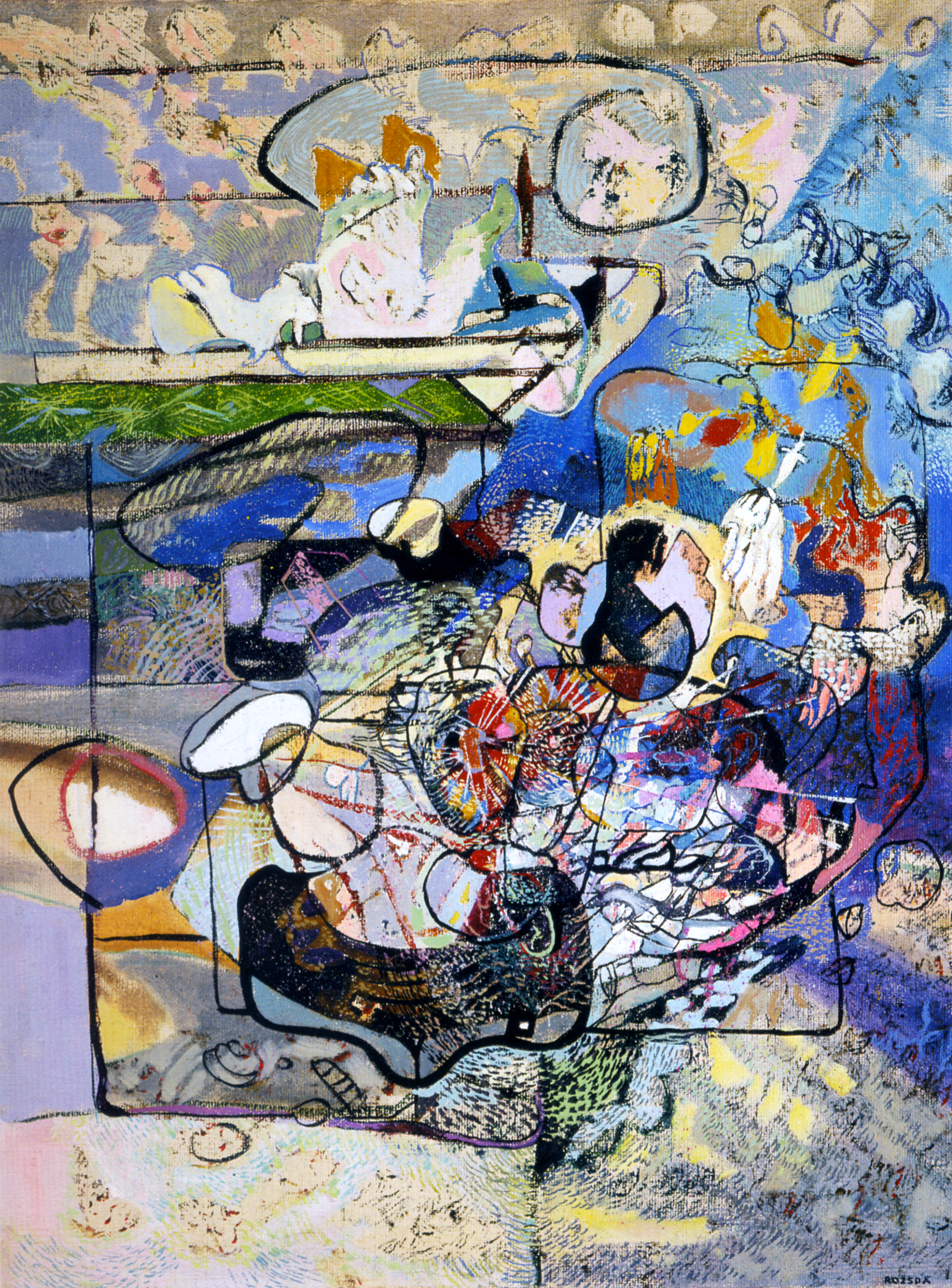
Sacred and Profane Love, 1947

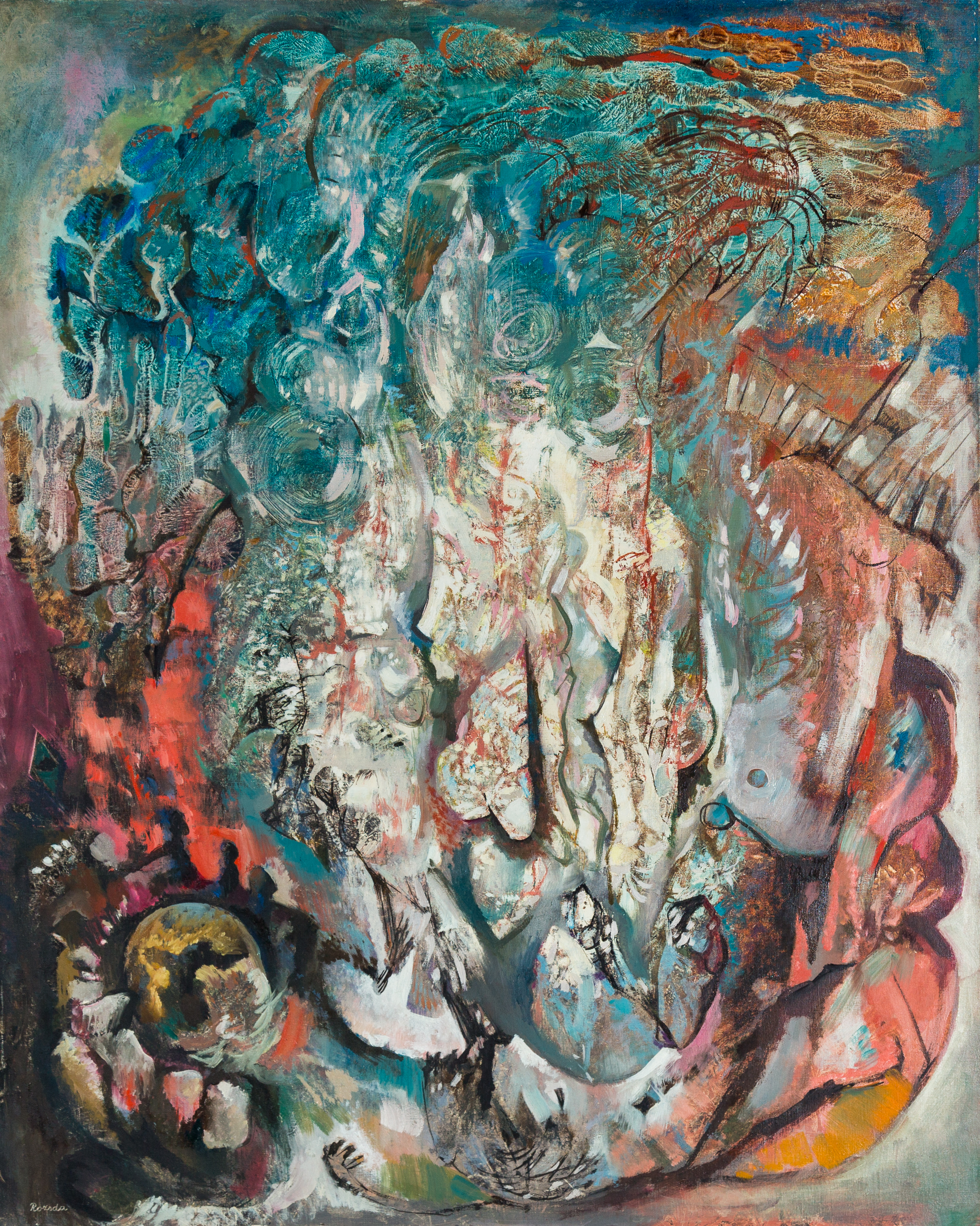
My first steps in the hell (1947)

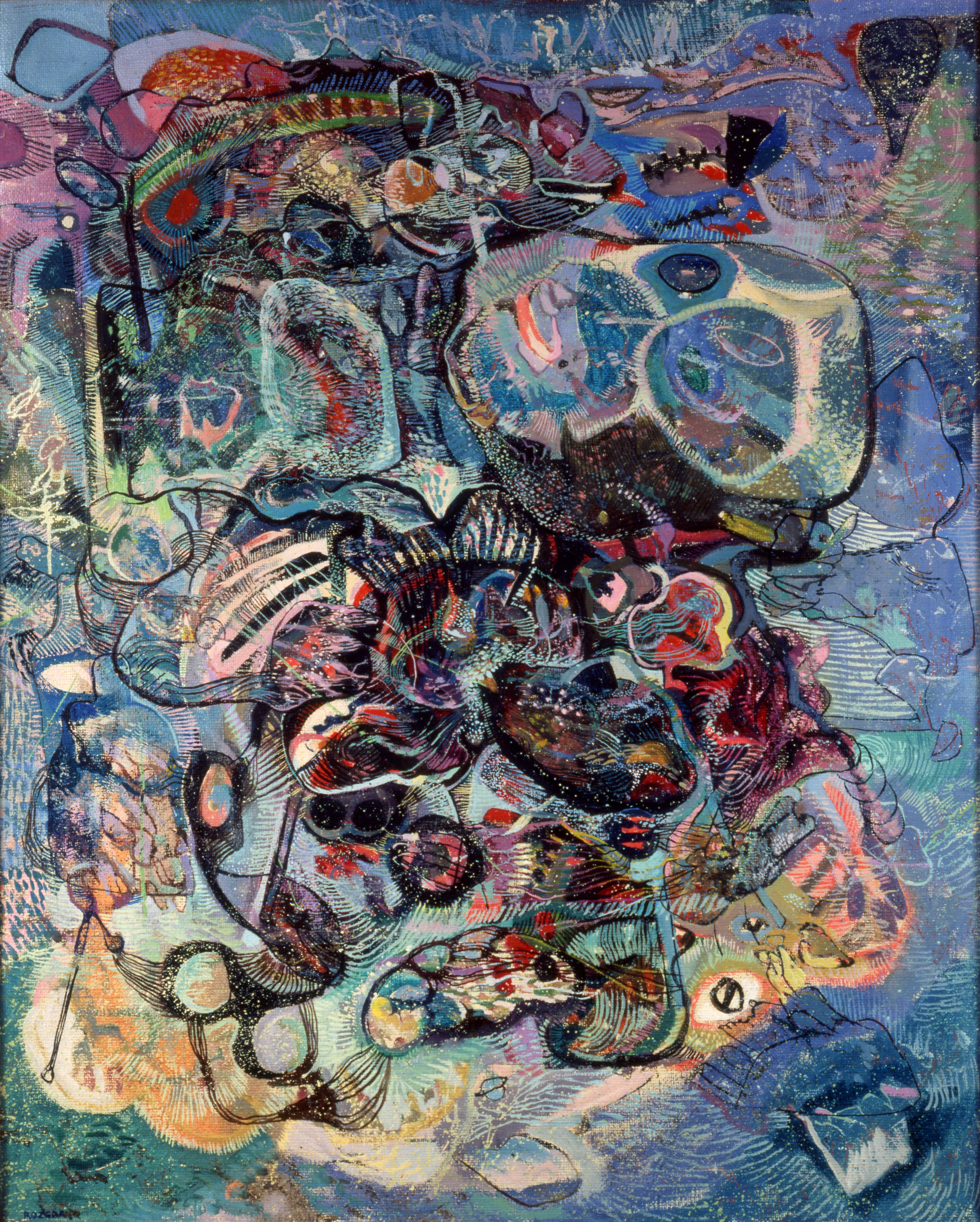
My grandmother's lorgnette (1947)

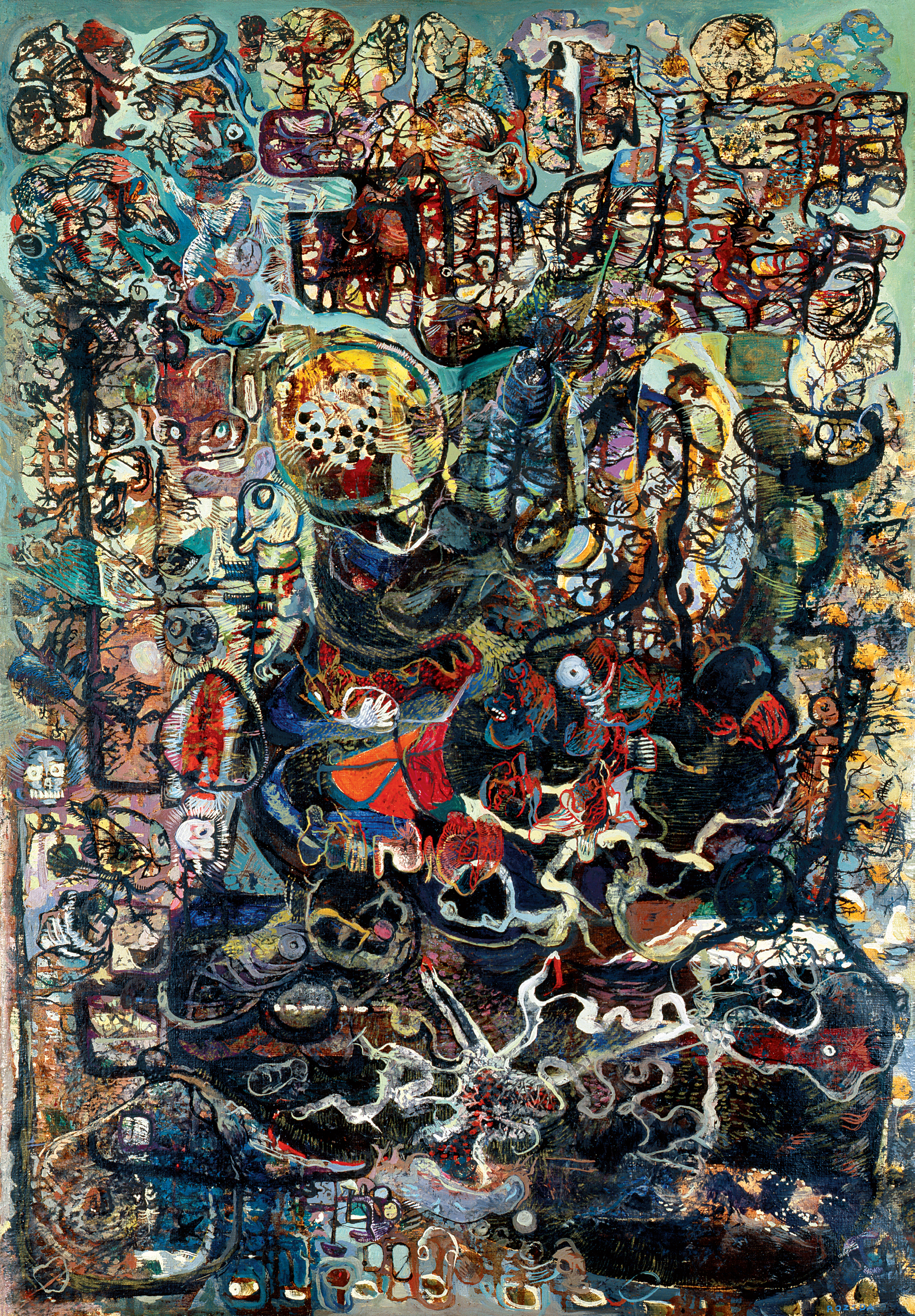
Danse Macabre (1946–47)

== Years of proscription (1949–1956) ==
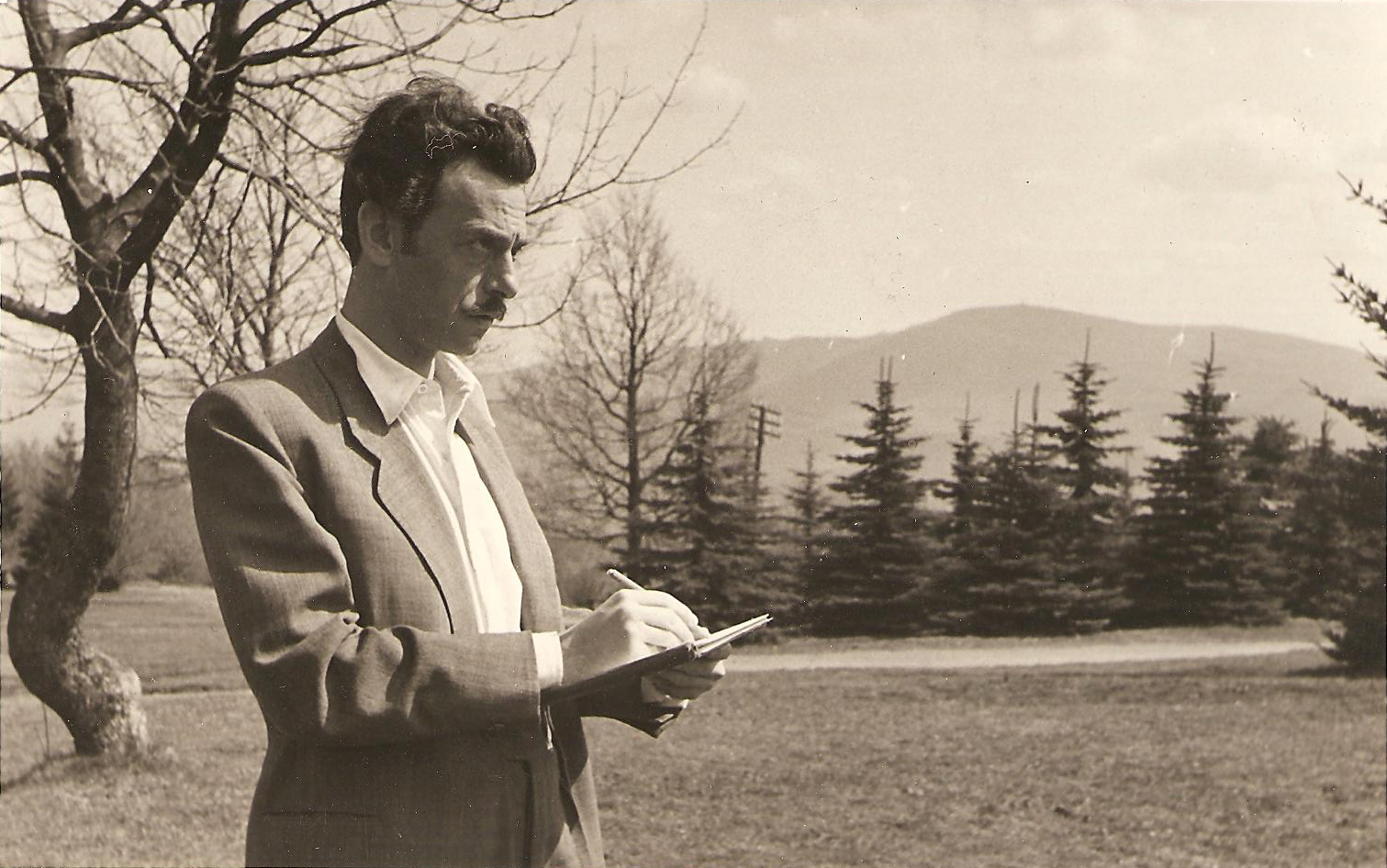

Following the establishment of the communist regime, nonfigurative and surrealist art was blacklisted. The European School was forced to end its activities.

This is how Rozsda remembers this period of his life: "With the establishment of the communist regime, events accelerated at a breakneck speed. In 1948 we simply had to disband the group. Our last meeting was held in the Japan Café. The next day we placed the following ad in the papers: A European was murdered in Japan. That was the end".

While abstract and surrealist artists could continue to work in secret and follow their calling, they could not exhibit their work. Endre Rozsda was forced to work on book illustrations. Denied the opportunity to paint freely, he took refuge in drawing. In sketchbooks he carried around, he celebrated the ordinary people of Hungary in the 1950s: intellectuals, peasants, and party people – iconic figures of the era. These elegant and sensitive drawings conjure the world of concert halls, bathhouses, courtrooms, farm cooperatives and hospitals, while they also express revulsion against the oppressive regime. The latter is illustrated by the faceless judge or the mocking tone of a self-portrait partly concealing a picture of Stalin.

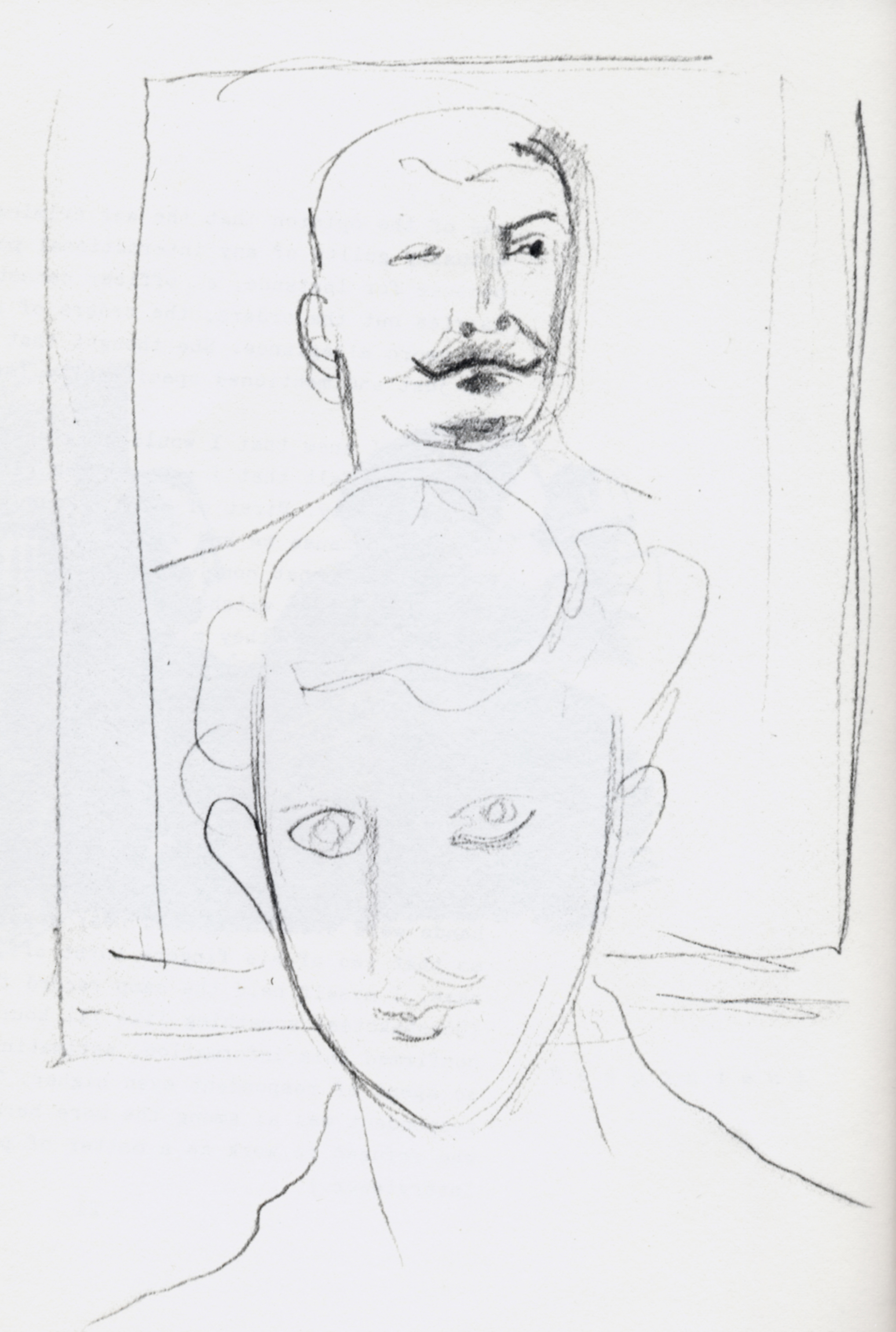
Self-portrait with Stalin (1950)

All through this time he never stopped making surrealistic drawings, the only opportunity to satisfy his urgent need to reinterpret reality (Surrealist tale, 1955). However, he found it increasingly difficult to accept the restrictions put on his artistic freedom. One month before the outbreak of the Revolution, on September 13, 1956 he signed a joint petition with five other artists: "There are a few of us in Hungary who had never given up our conviction that the art of the 20th century has a significant cultural mission. We have continued to work under the harshest conditions. (...) We define the modern artist as someone working in the spirit the 20th century, creating significant work in its style. Accordingly, we demand that the Federation change its policy regarding our work. (...) We demand the right to show our work at proper venues. We demand the right to express our views at all forums ending a situation where Hungary is artificially isolated from the development of art".

Subsequently, the signatories mounted an exhibition of their work at the Balassa Museum in Esztergom entitled Hetek (Weeks). The authorities (state censors) immediately closed the exhibition. Soon after, the revolution broke out.

== Surrealism as a research space (1957–1967) ==
After the suppression of the Hungarian Revolution in 1956, Endre Rozsda fled to Paris. The director of the French Institute in Budapest helped him to smuggle his paintings out of the country.

Within a few months he showed his work in Furstenberg Gallery, one of the most prominent exhibition spaces featuring surrealist artists. The foreword to the 1957 exhibition was written by André Breton, describing Rozsda's art in the following words: "We have the chance to find out in the paintings accomplished secretly by Rozsda during the last few years, and which good fortune allowed him to bring with him into exile. Here is the supreme example of what had to be kept hidden if one wanted to survive, and, equally, of the inner necessity that had to be snatched from the vilest coercion. Here the forces of death and love are pitted against each other; everywhere under the magma of blackened leaves and broken wings irresistible forces are seeking a way of escape so that nature and the human spirit may renew themselves through the most sumptuous of sacrifices, that which the spring demands in order that it may be born."

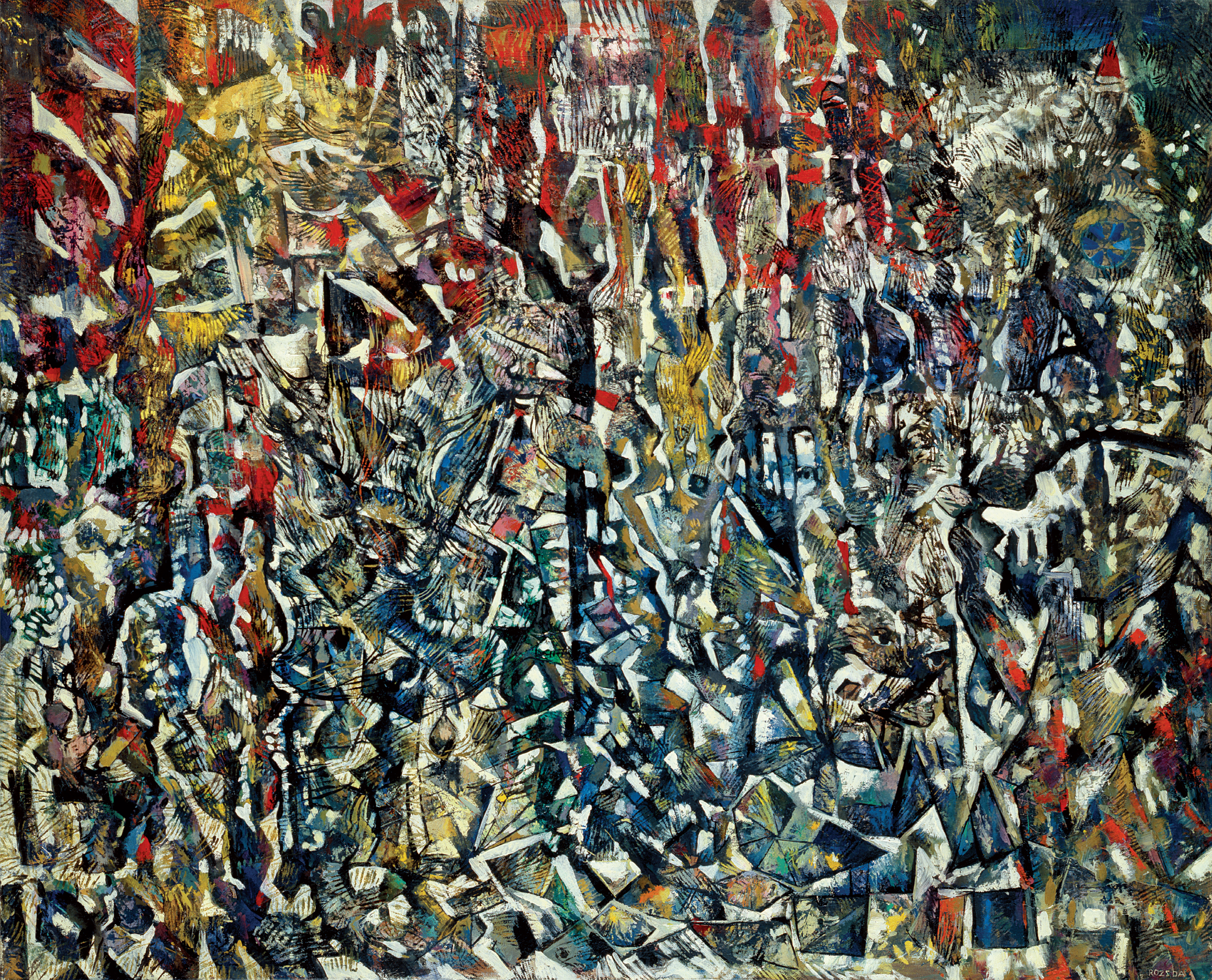
The Tower of Babel (1958-1961)

The exhibition earned the artist considerable recognition and in the images vibrating with dizzying details one of the critics celebrated that through them surrealism again demonstrates its most strident and powerful side. In 1960 he was invited to a group show, Antagonism, and the catalog foreword was written by Herbert Reed.

Around this time, Rozsda became acquainted with the art historian and perhaps the most respected collector of surrealist art, Arturo Schwarz, who remembered their meeting as follows: "André Breton advised me to discover 'this young man who has the keys to a marvelous world'. I remember his exact words, as the term 'marvelous' had a very special meaning for André.”

Thanks to this connection, one of Rozsda's works (Windows) was shown at the Galleria Schwarz in Milan in an international surrealist exhibition curated by André Breton in 1961.

In an interview he said that for him Surrealism represented primarily "a research space" and intellectual stimulation. His second show at the Furstenberg Gallery (1963) displayed the results of this exploratory work, although subsequently his painting took another turn and developed further in the direction of lyrical abstraction. Following the shift, he asked Breton whether his work could still be considered surrealist. “As it remains your perception of reality, you are a surrealist by necessity”, is how Rozsda recalled Breton's answer.

In the next few years the psychedelic swirling of motifs regularly morphed into architectonic structures in his paintings. While these structures were not geometric or systematic, they pointed in the direction of some kind of order. Rozsda's intention may have been to rearrange a shattered world into a system – built on the tensions and harmonies of color and form – where the rules of the conventional three-dimensional space no longer apply and where, as a result, the horizon of time may be represented as well. Examples include Headlong into a dream (1960), The Tower of Babel (1958–1961) and Saphirogramme (1969).

== Beyond surrealism (1968–1999) ==
By the evidence of his writings, Endre Rozsda was mainly preoccupied with the problem of capturing time through the medium of painting. Time that can be experienced and explored by the subjective mind.

"For Rozsda, subjectivity represented more than the depiction of emotions, he somehow wanted to capture consciousness itself through painting – the process during which the human being creates his or her own world. In accordance with this, the painterly representation of time – depicting time past and time unfathomable – rather than the representation of perspectival space, became the other guiding principle of Rozsda’s painting. Rozsda’s painting “technique” – the nonfigurative structure of the paintings and their rotation during the working process, which eliminates the illusion of real space while mysteriously also retaining it (in many pieces and in its details) – also points in this direction of surreal space and time”, art historian, Sándor Hornyik, explains.

From the start of the 1970s his paintings feature more detail than ever before. Recalling his first adventures with photography as a child, he revealed: “From age 15 or 16, I developed and printed my own images. Slowly by slowly, I started to feel a dual attraction: I took pictures in haste and rushed to develop the film. I realized that the camera acts as a magnifying glass, that with all the details it creates extremely beautiful images – at least for me. I believe this is the foundation of my painting. The desire to create details is still there."

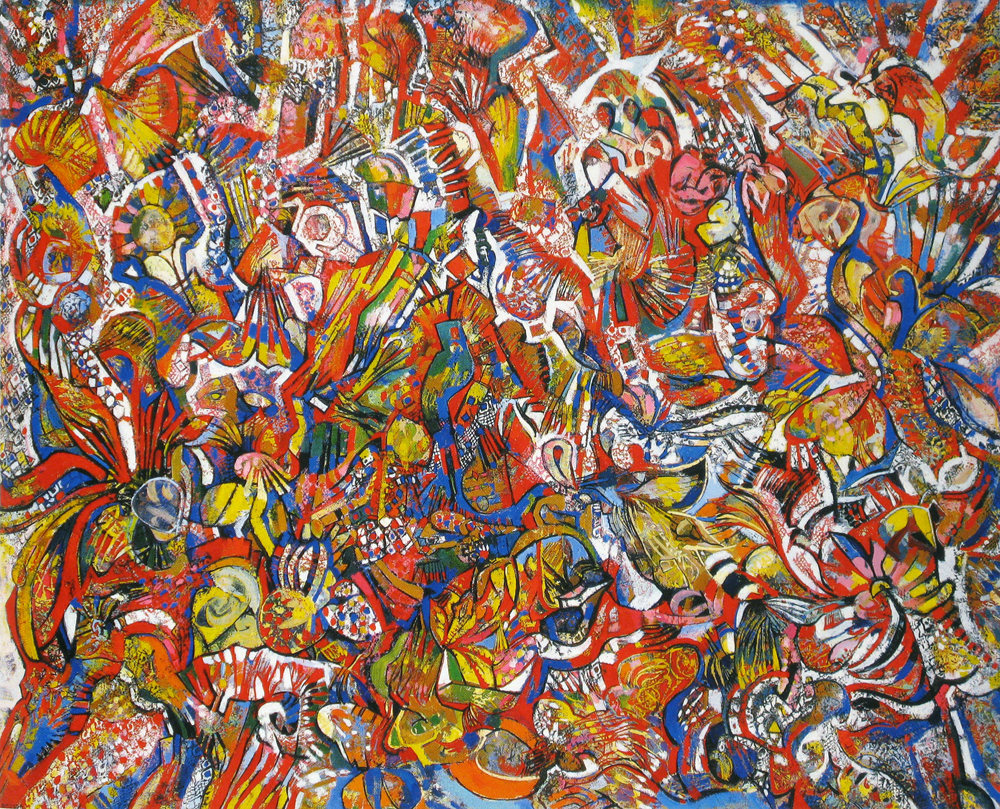
Hommage à Stravinsky (1976)

Accordingly, he built up images by allowing small details to rearrange themselves in random variations – in the mind of the beholder. Endre Rozsda had the ambition of making the viewer part of the creative process. To reach that end, he developed a method where first he breaks the world into an infinite variety of – some figurative, some abstract – component parts, then allows each viewer to use these as building blocks and construct a new totality along his/her vision, free association and imagination. Surrealism offered Rozsda the tool to give pictorial representation to his personal memories and fantasy, yet he aimed for something more: he wished to make the viewer his collaborator whose gaze helps to re-create an atomized and deconstructed world.

Apparently, this was when he also discovered a pictorial language that allowed him to represent fundamental ontological questions. From the start of the 1970s he painted a series of large, metaphysical images: The eternal secret of being (1971), Mystical symbol (1974), God (1976), Initiation (1976), You explain your God (1980). These pictures represent an ambitious effort to illustrate with pictorial means the realms of existence unavailable to reason and inexpressible by language.

"Little by little over the years, the visual language atomizes, stratifies, and develops itself. One can say that there is a fragmentation of sensorial space and its gradual replacement by an existential and personal space-time, which most certainly evokes Proust’s Remembrance of Things Past. In the later works the painter’s language becomes increasingly stylized. Colors and shapes exist more and more in themselves and for themselves. The subjective elements arising from personal memory are superseded by imperatives of an initiatory and metaphysical nature", Françoise Gilot wrote in her analysis, adding that these increasingly closed compositions require time and patience on the part of the viewer to reveal their profound richness.

Endre Rozsda had the following to say in this context: “To those who look at my work, I ask you to approach it with the kind of attention and contemplation I gave new things as a child, to take the time to find your way into the paintings I offer you and to wander about in them."

== Graphic works ==
In his study of Rozsda’s graphic work, a prominent student of Surrealism, Sarane Alexandrian started out with the premise that, in contrast to other artists where draftsmanship and painting are intertwined, Endre Rozsda "is an artist in a dual sense. In his case, the draftsman and the painter are almost two different persons. They work in parallel worlds, both creating distinct visual universes without the one connecting to the other ".

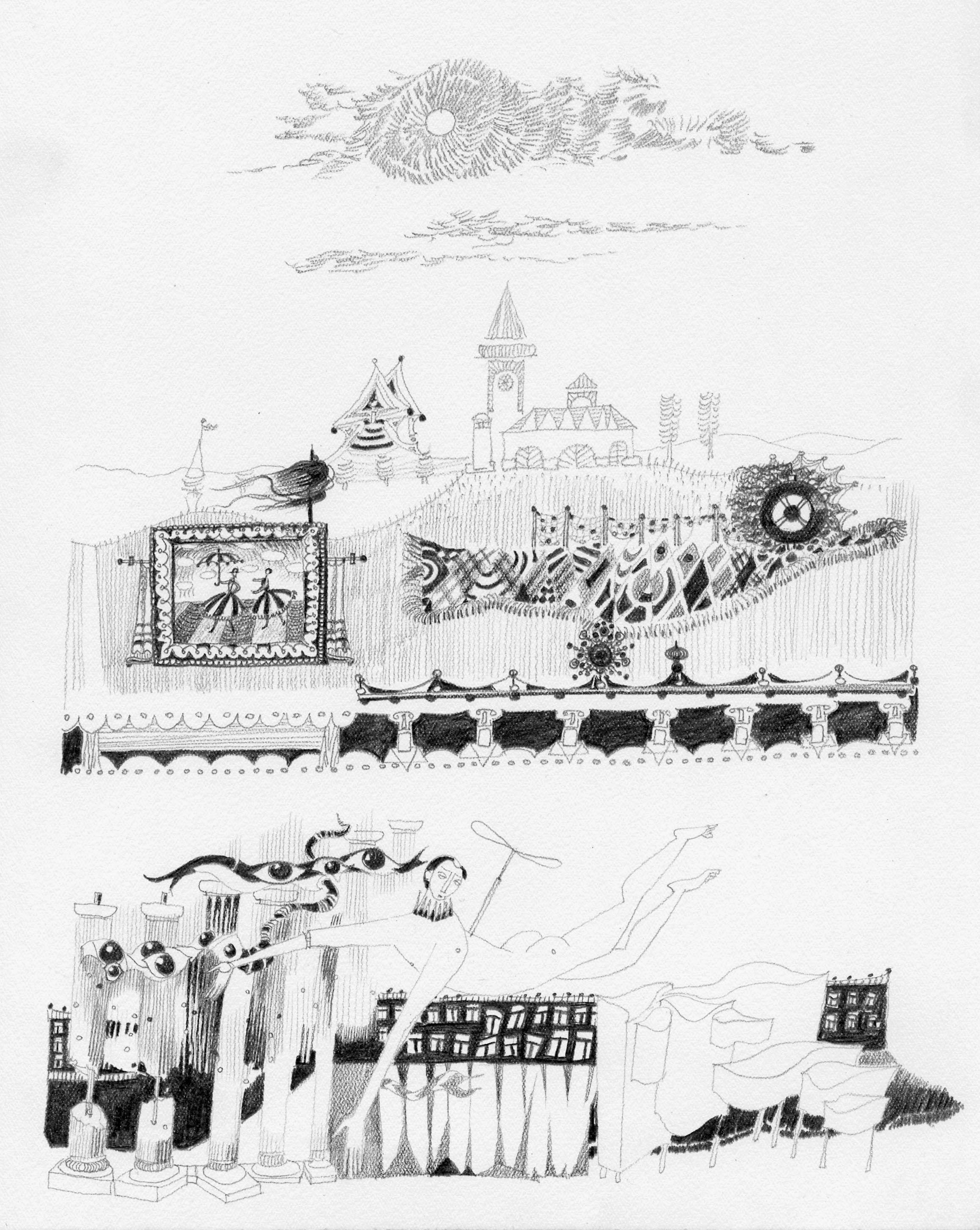
Surrealist tale (1955)

Indeed, this arc of transformation that led Rozsda's painting from post-Impressionism and Surrealism through lyrical abstraction is not found in his graphic work. This part of his oeuvres constitutes a separate realm created whole by a sensibility described as surrealist by Breton in that famous conversation. Throughout his career, Rozsda made figurative and abstract drawings and often a unique combination of the two, although this variability in subject matter and technique does not contradict the realization that this part of his oeuvres is inspired by the same surrealist ambition aimed at the liberation of the imagination and the representation of the hidden occupants of the mind. This is true even when he created with ease subtle drawings composed in a playful rhythm of simple forms and with sensual references, or when he brought to life ominously swirling fantasies populated by imaginary beings with extraordinary precision.

Studying the differences between Rozsda's paintings and drawings, Sarane Alexandrian discovered another intriguing feature. In some "of the drawings we find a quality not seen in his paintings, or hidden with such perfection as to make it invisible at first glance: humor. With a simple line of the pencil or pen, Rozsda is capable of mocking various aspects of observed reality. (...) In most cases, his sense of humor works in the world of imagination; he likes to create shocking human forms: a trumpet-mouthed figure whose chest and thighs are covered with female breasts. There is also a grotesque trapeze-shaped woman resembling Mama Ubu. His male portrait, showing a man with an open mouth yawning (or yelling?) with circle-shaped wrinkles around the chin, is simultaneously tragic and comic". Alexandrian draws the following conclusion: "This artist dares to be ambiguous and go out on a limb where pain and pleasure, laughter and terror converge".

== Photographic work ==
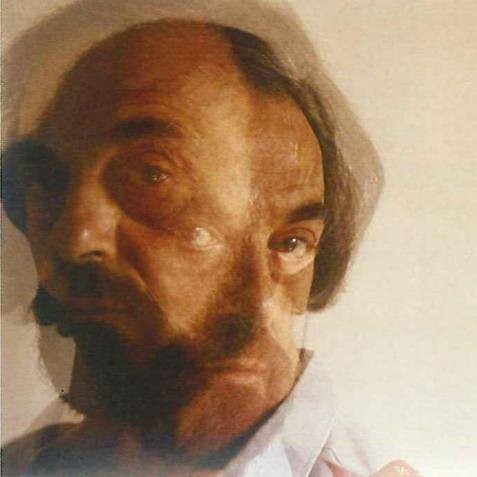
A 1978 superposition autoportrait

In addition to painting and graphic arts, Endre Rozsda made his mark in photography as well. One of his first extant prints is a self-portrait made at age 14, foreshadowing his future photographic work and painting style. In this surprisingly complex photograph taken in 1927 spatial depth disappears, distinct shapes appear on a single plane, including young Rozsda's portrait, captured through reflections.

As a young man, he made a large number of documentary photographs, and later he was primarily preoccupied with such mundane objects as wilting flowers filtered through unusual lighting or superimposed images. However, the most frequently photographed subject was himself; throughout his career he made self-portraits where he often depicted himself in multiple forms.

In contrast to his paintings, his photographs do not show dramatic stylistic shifts either. He was inspired by the same thing throughout his life: the creation of new images through a close observation of details and a combination of various visual components. Consequently, he often photographed reflections, storefronts and windows. Often, he exposed the same frame several times, in many cases turning the camera by 90 or 180 degrees. Of all his images with multiple exposures the ones combining one of his paintings with the trees and houses surrounding his studio are of particular interest.

These "vision-within-a-vision” type photographs appear to be attempts at capturing the fleeting moment of transfiguration between natural and pictorial reality.

In his will Rozsda left a large number of his photographs, photo negatives and transparencies to the Hungarian Photography Museum.
