= Maxime Maufra =

French painter

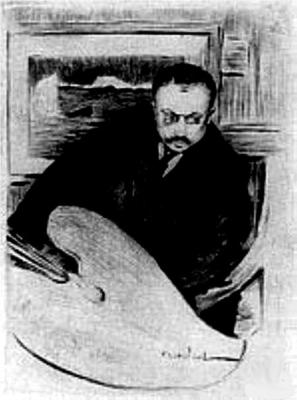
- Maxime Maufra (1910)
- Born: 17 May 1861; Nantes, France
- Died: 23 May 1918 (aged 57); Poncé-sur-le-Loir, France
- Occupation: Painter

Maxime Maufra (17 May 1861 – 23 May 1918) was a French landscape and marine painter, etcher and lithographer.

== Life ==
Maufra first began painting at 18. He was encouraged to do so by two artists from Nantes such as the brothers Charles Leduc and Alfred Leduc and the landscape painter Charles Le Roux.

However, he did not fully embrace his painting career right away. He remained in the first place a businessman and only painted in his spare time from 1884 to 1890. During this period, Maufra discovered the work of the Impressionists. He also displayed his works at the Paris Salon of 1886.

In 1890, Maufra decided to give up business and to become a full-time painter. He left Nantes for Pont-Aven in the Finistère department of Brittany, where he was met Paul Gauguin and Paul Sérusier. Maufra had his first solo exhibition in Paris in 1894, at Le Barc de Toutteville. He subsequently exhibited with Durand-Ruel, to whom he remained under contract for the rest of his life.

Returning from Brittany, Maufra was the first painter to take up residence in the Bateau-Lavoir in Montmartre, a famous Parisian residence for artists. He returned to Brittany each year, in particular to the Quiberon region. He found inspiration for his art in his travels which took him to the Dauphiné (1904), the Midi (1912), Algeria (1913) and Savoy (1914).

== Work ==
Maufra was mainly an artist of landscapes and marine views. In his compositions, Maufra sometimes quoted the pointillist technique of Camille Pissarro or Alfred Sisley, and also took from the strong colors and powerful drawing of the Pont-Aven School.

Maufra remained an independent artist his whole life through and dedicated his art to recording the beauty of nature. He also explored etching and lithography.

== Gallery ==
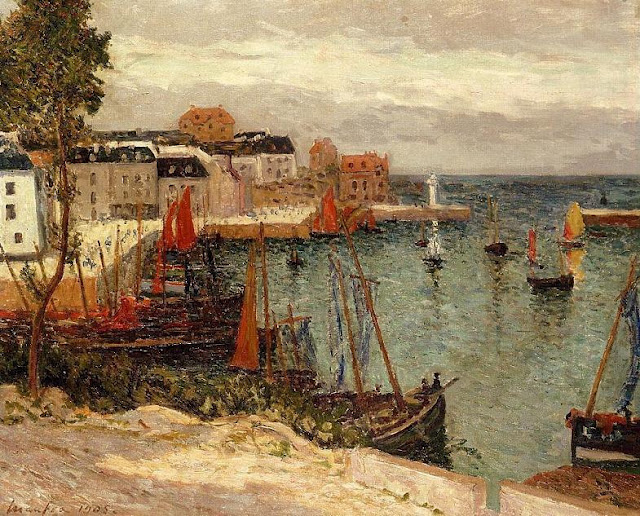
The Port of Sauzon-Belle-Isle-en-Mer (1910)

The Loir at Poncé, Sarthe, 1918. Clark Art Institute

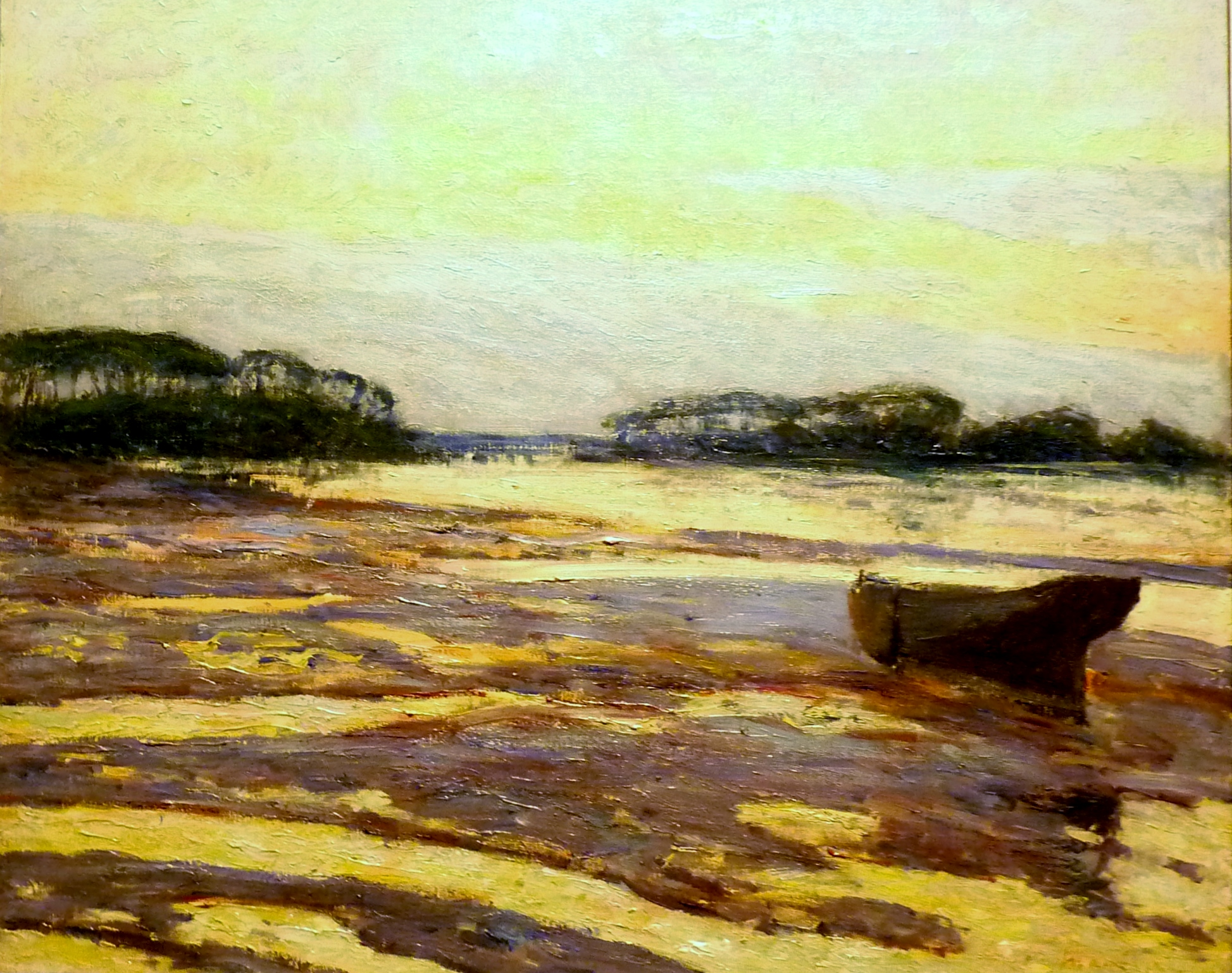
Yellow dusk on the mudflats, Loctudy (1898)

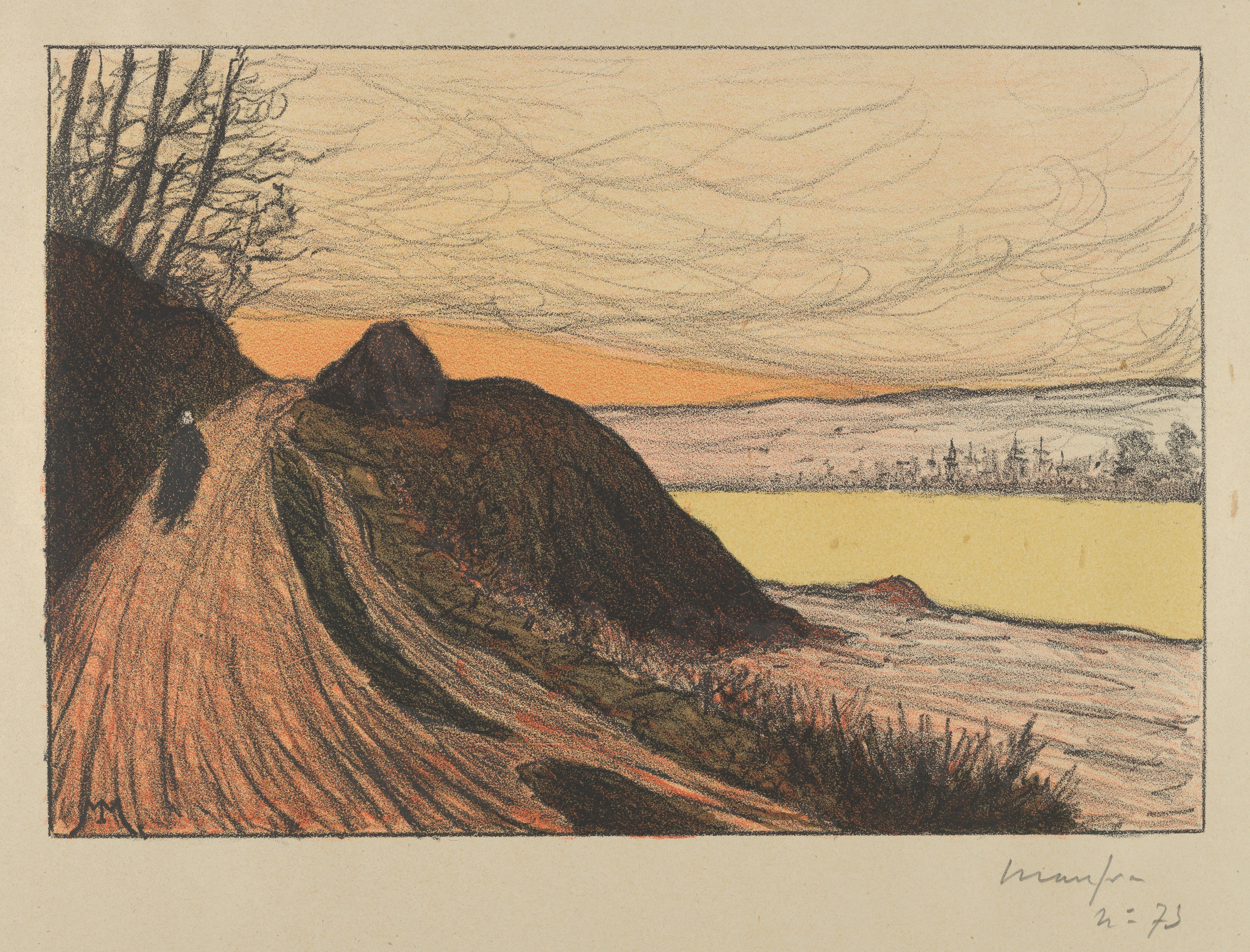
The Road from Gaud, lithograph (1893)
