= Fernande Olivier =

French painter (1881-1966)

- Fernande Olivier, photographed by Pablo Picasso in 1906
- Born: Amélie Lang; 6 June 1881; Paris, France
- Died: 29 January 1966 (aged 84)
- Occupations: Artist, model

Fernande Olivier (born Amélie Lang; 6 June 1881 – 29 January 1966) was a French artist and model known primarily for having been the model and first muse of painter Pablo Picasso, and for her written accounts of her relationship with him. Picasso painted over 60 portraits of Olivier.

== Early years ==
Pablo Picasso, Les Demoiselles d'Avignon, 1907

Olivier was born in Paris on 6 June 1881 of an out-of-wedlock relationship between her mother and a married man. She was raised by an aunt and uncle, who attempted to arrange a marriage for her. Instead, Olivier ran away and married a man who abused her. In 1900, when she was 19 years old, she left her husband without a formal divorce and moved to Paris. She changed her name so that her husband could not find her.

Olivier quickly found work modeling for artists and was known in Montmartre as "La Belle Fernande". She was a fixture in the circle of friends of writer Guillaume Apollinaire, where she also became friends with Paul Léautaud, Kees van Dongen and Edmond-Marie Poullain. Van Dongen in particular painted her several times.

== Relationship with Picasso ==
She met Picasso at the Bateau-Lavoir, 13 Rue de Ravignan in 1904, and by the next year they were living together. Their relationship lasted seven years and was characterized by its tempestuousness. Both Olivier and Picasso were jealous lovers, and their passions sometimes exploded into violence. Picasso would often lock Olivier in their apartment when he went out due to his jealousy. Olivier wrote in her diary, "Picasso, due to a sort of morbid jealousy, kept me as a recluse. But with tea, books, a divan and little cleaning to do, I was happy, very happy."

Pablo Picasso, 1909–10, Head of a Woman (Fernande), modeled on Fernande Olivier

Olivier was Picasso's first muse. In the spring and summer of 1906, following some sales of artwork, the couple were able to finance a trip to Barcelona and to the remote village of Gósol in the Spanish Pyrenees. In Barcelona Fernande was introduced to Picasso's family and local friends. In Gósol Picasso worked prolifically including executing several portraits of Fernande. Later, among his most notable works of his Cubist period from 1907 to 1909, several were inspired by Olivier. These include Head of a Woman (Fernande). He later admitted that one of the Demoiselles d'Avignon was modeled after her.

In April 1907, Olivier went to a local orphanage and adopted a 13-year-old girl, Raymonde. The small family did not last, however, and upon discovering explicit drawings of Raymonde made by Picasso, Olivier sent the girl back to the orphanage. Olivier made no mention of Raymonde in her memoirs.

The couple briefly stayed in Barcelona and then, in 1909, spent the summer in Horta de Sant Joan, where Olivier learned some Catalan. They returned to Paris, but moved to 11 Boulevard de Clichy. In 1910, they returned to Catalonia for a holiday and also spent time in Barcelona and Cadaqués.

When Picasso finally achieved success as an artist, he began to lose interest in Fernande, as she reminded him of more difficult times. In the summer of 1911, Picasso went to Ceret. In the autumn, he met Eva Gouel, who became his lover. Picasso and Olivier separated in 1912, leaving Olivier without a way to carry on living in the style to which she had become accustomed. She had no legal right to expect anything from the painter, since she was still technically married to her first husband. To survive, she took various odd jobs, including cashier, butcher and antiques saleswoman. She also supplemented her income by giving drawing lessons.

== Writing career ==
Twenty years after her relationship with Picasso, she wrote memoirs of their life together. By that time, Picasso was the most famous artist of the age and the publication of Olivier's memoirs carried commercial potential. The memoir, entitled Picasso et ses amis (Picasso and his Friends), was published in 1930 in serialized form in the Belgian daily Le Soir, despite Picasso's strong opposition. He hired lawyers to prevent the publication of the series (only six articles were published). The remainder of her story eventually appeared in 1988 in Loving Picasso.

== Later years ==
In 1956, when Olivier had become deaf and was suffering from arthritis, she persuaded Picasso to pay her a small pension in exchange for her promise not to publish anything further about their relationship as long as either of them was alive. She died on 29 January 1966 in Paris at the age of 84.
