= Kees van Dongen =

Dutch painter (1877–1968)

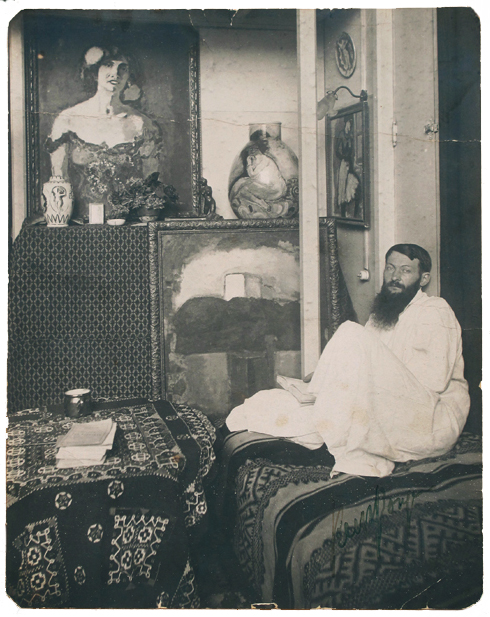
- Van Dongen in his studio, c. 1910
- Born: Cornelis Theodorus Maria van Dongen; 26 January 1877; Rotterdam, Netherlands
- Died: 28 May 1968 (aged 91); Monte Carlo, Monaco
- Known for: Painting
- Movement: Fauvism

Cornelis Theodorus Maria "Kees" van Dongen (26 January 1877 – 28 May 1968) was a Dutch-French painter who was one of the leading Fauves. Van Dongen's early work was influenced by the Hague School and symbolism and it evolved gradually into a rough pointillist style. From 1905 onwards – when he took part at the controversial 1905 Salon d'Automne exhibition – his style became more and more radical in its use of form and colour. The paintings he made in the period of 1905–1910 are considered by some to be his most important works. The themes of his work from that period are predominantly centered on the nightlife. He painted dancers, singers, masquerades, and theatre. Van Dongen gained a reputation for his sensuous – at times garish – portraits, especially of women.

== Life and work ==
Kees van Dongen was born in Delfshaven, then on the outskirts, and today a borough, of Rotterdam. He was the second of four children in a middle-class family. In 1892, at age 16, Kees van Dongen started his studies at the Royal Academy of Fine Arts in Rotterdam, working with J. Striening and J.G. Heyberg. During this period (1892–97), Van Dongen frequented the Red Quarter seaport area, where he drew scenes of sailors and prostitutes. He met Augusta Preitinger at the Academy, a fellow painter.

Woman with Large Hat (Femme au grand chapeau), 1906, oil on canvas, 100 cm × 81 cm (39 in × 32 in)

In 1897, Van Dongen lived in Paris for several months, where there was a large emigre community. In December 1899, he returned from Rotterdam to Paris, where Preitinger had moved before him and found work.

== Marriage and family ==
He returned to join Augusta Preitinger ("Guus"), whom he had met at the Academy. They married on 11 July 1901. They had two children together: a son died a couple of days after birth in December 1901; their daughter Augusta, called "Dolly", was born 18 April 1905. Around that time, Van Dongen produced a painting of Fernande Olivier, which was the reason why — according to Gertrude Stein in her 1933 book The Autobiography of Alice B. Toklas — he broke into notoriety. Apparently, according to Stein:

Van Dongen did not admit that this picture was a portrait of Fernande, although she had sat for it and there was in consequence much bitterness. Van Dongen in these days was poor, he had a dutch wife who was a vegetarian and they lived on spinach. Van Dongen frequently escaped from the spinach to a joint in Montmartre where the girls paid for his dinner and his drinks.

Guus took Dolly to see their families in Rotterdam in the summer of 1914, where they were caught by the outbreak of World War I. They were not able to return to Paris until 1918. Preitinger and Van Dongen divorced in 1921.

In 1917, Van Dongen had become involved with a married socialite, the fashion director Léa Alvin, also known as Jasmy Jacob. Their relationship lasted until 1927.

== Career ==
Portrait of Daniel-Henry Kahnweiler (Portrait de Kahnweiler), c. 1907–08, oil on canvas, 65 cm × 54 cm (26 in × 21 in), Musée du Petit Palais, Geneva

Kees van Dongen exhibition at the Museum Boijmans Van Beuningen in 1967

Van Dongen began to exhibit in Paris, and participated in the controversial 1905 Salon d'Automne exhibition along with Henri Matisse, André Derain, Albert Marquet, Maurice de Vlaminck, Charles Camoin, and Jean Puy. The bright colours of this group of artists led to them being called Fauves ('Wild Beasts') by art critic Louis Vauxcelles. Van Dongen was also briefly a member of the German Expressionist group Die Brücke.

In these years, he was part of an avant-garde wave of painters, including Maurice de Vlaminck, Othon Friesz, Henri Rousseau, Robert Delaunay, Albert Marquet, Édouard Vuillard, who aspired to a renewal of painting which they thought was stuck in neo-impressionism.

In 1906, Preitinger and Van Dongen moved to the Bateau Lavoir at 13 rue Ravignan in Montmartre, where they were friends with the circle surrounding Pablo Picasso and his girlfriend Fernande Olivier. He taught at the Académie Vitti in 1912.

In addition to selling his paintings, Van Dongen also gained an income by selling satirical sketches to the newspaper Revue Blanche. He also organised very successful costume balls in Montparnasse, to which people paid admission, to gain extra income.

After the First World War, under the influence of his companion, the fashion director Lea Alvin (Jasmy Jacob), among others, Van Dongen developed the lush colours of his Fauvist style. This earned him a solid reputation with the French bourgeoisie and upper class, where he was in demand for his portraits. As a fashionable portraitist, he was commissioned for subjects including Arletty, Louis Barthou, Sacha Guitry, Leopold III of Belgium, Anna de Noailles, Madame Grès and Maurice Chevalier.

With a playful cynicism he remarked of his popularity as a portraitist with high society women, "The essential thing is to elongate the women and especially to make them slim. After that it just remains to enlarge their jewels. They are ravished." This remark is reminiscent of another of his sayings: "Painting is the most beautiful of lies".

In 1957, Kay Thompson featured one of his paintings in her book Eloise in Paris.

The social and commercial appeal of his later work (such as a 1959 portrait of Brigitte Bardot in a little black dress, with her hair tousled) did not match the artistic promise or the bohemian eroticism of his first three decades of work.

From 1959, Kees van Dongen lived in Monaco. He died in his home in Monte Carlo in 1968. An extensive collection of van Dongen's work is held by the New National Museum of Monaco. His work was also part of the painting event in the art competition at the 1932 Summer Olympics.

From 24 March – 31 May 2026, the Helene Bailly Marcilhac Gallery, Paris exhibited Kees van Dongen, a monographic exhibit.

== Selected works ==
Femme aux bas noirs (Woman with Black Stockings), c. 1907, oil on canvas, 129.5 cm × 195.5 cm (51.0 in × 77.0 in)

Les lutteuses (Lutteuses du Tabarin), 1907–08, oil on canvas, 105.5 cm × 164 cm (41.5 in × 64.6 in), Nouveau Musée National de Monaco

Lucie and her Dance-Partner, 1911, oil on canvas, 130 cm × 96.5 cm (51.2 in × 38.0 in), Hermitage Museum

Le lévrier bleu (Le chien bleu, Portrait de Mlle Dumarest), 1919, oil on canvas, 195 cm × 97 cm (77 in × 38 in)

The Dancer Anita, c. 1907–08, oil on canvas, 130.5 cm × 97 cm (51.4 in × 38.2 in), National Gallery of Denmark

La Femme au Jabot (Woman with Frill), c. 1911, oil on canvas, 98 cm × 79 cm (39 in × 31 in)

La robe rose (Ève Francis), c. 1919, oil on canvas, 146.5 cm × 114.3 cm (57.7 in × 45.0 in)

La femme au foulard, before 1920, oil on canvas, 92.5 cm × 73.5 cm (36.4 in × 28.9 in)

Mme Jasmy Alvin, before 1920, oil on canvas, 195 cm × 131.5 cm (76.8 in × 51.8 in), Musée national d'art moderne

The Sphinx, 1920, oil on canvas, 146 cm × 113 cm (57 in × 44 in), Musée d'Art Moderne de Paris

La Baigneuse, Deauville, 1920, oil on canvas, 195 cm × 129 cm (77 in × 51 in)

== Honours ==
- 1926, Knight of the Legion of Honour
- 1927, Order of the Crown of Belgium
- 1929, the French government awarded him citizenship
- 1954, Officer of the Legion of Honour

== References and sources ==
Sources

- Engers, Rudolf (2002). Het kleurrijke leven van Kees van Dongen. Scriptum Art. ISBN 978-90-5594-266-4.
- Gaston, Diehl. Van Dongen. New York, NY: Crown Publishers, Inc.
