= List of Picasso artworks 1931–1940 =

Artworks by Pablo Picasso from 1931 to 1940:

- Still Life on Pedestal Table – 1931
- The Sculptor – 1931
- Figures by the Sea – 1931
- Woman with Yellow Hair – 1931
- Woman in a Red Armchair (1931), displayed in public for the first time in 2016 at the Met Breuer; not to be confused with Woman in a Red Armchair (1929)
- Bust of a Woman (Marie-Thérèse) (1931)
- Girl before a Mirror – 1932
- Young Woman with Mandolin – 1932, likely a portrait of Picasso's young mistress Marie-Thérèse Walter, University of Michigan Museum of Art
- Woman with Book – 1932
- La Lecture – 1932
- Le Repos – 1932
- Le Rêve – 1932
- Nude, Green Leaves and Bust – 1932
- Nude in a Black Armchair – 1932
- Nude Woman in a Red Armchair (Femme nue dans un fauteuil rouge, Marie-Thérèse Walter, 1932), Tate
- Femme à la montre, Oil on canvas, 51 1/8 by 38 1/8 in (130 by 97 cm), former collection of Emily Fisher Landau
- The Red Armchair – 1933
- The Rooster – 1933
- Woman with a Vase – 1933
- Seated Model & Sculptor Studying Sculptured Head (Sculpteur, Modèle couché et sculpture, 1933) from the Vollard Suite
- Minotaur Kneeling over Sleeping Girl – 1933
- The Bullfight (Courses de taureaux) – 1934, oil on canvas, University of Michigan Museum of Art
- Dying Bull – 1934
- Girl Reading at a Table – 1934
- The Painter – 1934, Wadsworth Atheneum
- The Studio – 1934 (oil and enamel on canvas, 5' 1/3" x 4' 1/4", collection of the Metropolitan Museum of Art)
- Two Girls Reading (Deux Enfants Lisant) – 1934, oil on canvas, University of Michigan Museum of Art
- Jeune Fille Endormie – 1935
- The Muse – 1935
- Minotauromachy – 1935
- Minotaur Moving – 1936
- Faun Revealing a Sleeping Woman (Jupiter and Antiope, after Rembrandt) (Faune dévoilant une dormeuse (Jupiter et Antiope, d'après Rembrandt, 1936), Tate
- The Vollard Suite of 100 etchings was completed in 1937. Commissioned in 1930, Picasso had begun work on the suite in 1933. Over 300 sets were created.
- Seated Woman (Portrait of Marie-Thérèse Walter) – 1937
- Lee Miller (of Lee Miller, 1937)
- The Dream and Lie of Franco – 1937
- Guernica – 1937
- Portrait of Dora Maar – 1937
- The Weeping Woman (Femme en pleurs, 1937), Tate Modern
- The Bathers – 1937
- Woman in Hat and Fur Collar – 1937
- Girl with a Red Beret and Pompom – 1937
- Femme au béret et à la robe quadrillée (Marie-Thérèse Walter) – 1937
- The Artist Before His Canvas – 1938
- Girl With A Boat – 1938
- Man with a Lollipop −1938
- Woman with a Hairnet – 1938
- Maya in a Sailor Suit – 1938
- Maya with Doll – 1938 (owned by Diana Widmaier Picasso)
- Dora Maar Seated (Dora Maar assise, 1938), Tate
- Woman with Cockerel – 1938
- Una mujer – 1939
- Woman's Head – 1939
