= La Lecture =

1932 painting by Pablo Picasso

- Artist: Pablo Picasso
- Year: 1932
- Medium: Oil on panel
- Dimensions: 65.5 cm × 51 cm (25.8 in × 20 in)
- Location: Private collection

La Lecture (or Reading) is a painting by Spanish artist Pablo Picasso completed in January 1932. The oil painting depicts Picasso's mistress and muse, Marie-Thérèse Walter, asleep with a book upon her lap. The painting led to the breakup of Picasso's marriage to Olga Khokhlova after she saw it at a retrospective exhibition and realised that the facial features were not her own. The painting went to auction in 1989 and in 1996, where it failed to sell. In January 2011, it was announced that La Lecture would be going to auction on 8 February. The painting, which had not been seen in Europe since the exhibition, was then displayed at Sotheby's in Paris.

== Background ==
Picasso met Marie-Thérèse Walter in 1927 as she exited the Paris Metro and they later began a relationship, which they kept secret because she was only seventeen and Picasso was married to Olga Khokhlova. Until he painted La Lecture, Picasso often embedded some of Walter's features in the backgrounds of his other works. When La Lecture was exhibited at a Picasso retrospective, Khokhlova realised that her husband was in a relationship with another woman after noticing that the facial features in the painting were not hers. She ended her marriage to Picasso shortly afterward. Walter later inspired other Picasso works including Le Rêve, which Picasso painted in the same month as La Lecture, and Nude, Green Leaves and Bust. On Walter's influence on Picasso and his work, The Art Wolf said "Marie-Thérès's potent mix of physical attractiveness and sexual naivety had an intoxicating effect on Picasso, and his rapturous desire for her brought about a number of images that are among the most sought after of his long career."

== Description ==
Picasso painted La Lecture from December 1931 to its completion in January 1932 during, what art experts have named, his "lovestruck period." The painting is oil on panel and is 65.5 by 51 centimeters. Picasso has used bright colours, including yellow and green, to depict a nude Walter asleep in a chair with a book in her lap. Mark Brown of The Guardian said the book in Walter's lap is a "sexual symbol" and the painting has been described as being sensual, erotic and happy. Of the painting and Picasso, Philip Hook from Sotheby's said "In the early 1930s he was very lyrically in love and reflected that in these gorgeous colors, and lovely compositions. This period is just about the most desirable of all Picasso's (periods), certainly in market terms." As Picasso painted La Lecture just days apart from La Rêve, the two paintings are very similar in composition.

== Auctions ==
The painting was auctioned in 1989 and it sold for $5.8 million. In 1996, La Lecture went to auction again at Christie's in New York. It was estimated to sell between $6–8 million, but it failed to sell after bidding stopped at $4.8 million. The Independent reported that many people had judged the painting to be "over-valued." Over the years, the painting has been owned by American art collectors Keith Warner, David Lloyd Kreeger and James W. Alsdorf.

In January 2011, it was announced that La Lecture would be included in an Impressionist and Modern art sale by Sotheby's in London on 8 February 2011. The work was being sold by an American collector. Ahead of the auction, La Lecture, which had not been seen in Europe since the Picasso retrospective, went on display in Paris. The painting was estimated to fetch between £12–18 million and Helena Newman from Sotheby's said that the painting will "excite a lot of interest." On 8 February, La Lecture was sold in six minutes to an anonymous telephone bidder for £25.2 million ($40.7 million).

== See also ==
- Woman in a Red Armchair
- Portrait of Dora Maar
- The Weeping Woman
