= Femme au béret et à la robe quadrillée (Marie-Thérèse Walter) =

Painting by Pablo Picasso

- Artist: Pablo Picasso
- Year: 1937
- Medium: oil on canvas
- Dimensions: 55 cm × 46 cm (21 5/8 in × 18 1/8 in)
- Location: Private collection

Femme au béret et à la robe quadrillée (Marie-Thérèse Walter) (Woman wearing a beret and checkered dress) is an oil-on-canvas painting by Pablo Picasso, which he created in 1937. It is a portrait of Marie-Thérèse Walter, Picasso's lover and muse during this period and was created with elements of Cubism. The painting signifies a transition in their relationship by combining Walter's profile with that of Picasso's new lover, the Surrealist photographer Dora Maar, with whom he began a relationship in 1936. This portrait was produced in the same year as Guernica and The Weeping Woman, a significant phase in Picasso's artistic career. On 28 February 2018, it was sold at Sotheby's auction for £49.8 million, making it one of the most expensive paintings ever sold at an auction in Europe.

== Background ==
This portrait reflects the artist's evolving relationship with Marie-Thérèse Walter during this period of their relationship. Prior to producing this work, Picasso had depicted his relationship with Walter as a blissful partnership, illustrated by the many sensual portraits that he created of her in 1932, which has led to her being described as Picasso's "Golden Muse". However, this painting reveals a change in their relationship over the course of five years. By 1937, Walter was the mother of Picasso's daughter, Maya, and her status as his mistress was under threat with the introduction of Dora Maar as a new love in the artist's life.

The painting was produced in 1937, a particularly significant year in Picasso's artistic career, in which he also produced Guernica and The Weeping Woman. These significant works were the result of a turbulent year defined by political unrest in Spain and the bombing of the town of Guernica. Produced in December 1937, this portrait has been viewed as a continuation of The Weeping Woman theme. Neil Cox remarked on the perceived connection between Picasso's turbulent personal life and the political upheaval of the period, stating, "For Picasso the question of 'modernity' was acute in the 1930s and 1940s, since modernity in this period meant a personal life, a nation, a Europe and indeed a world in crisis. This period in Picasso's art is marked by a succession of shattering events in his personal life that no doubt appeared to him mirrored by the disasters in the world at large." Picasso's response to these turbulent events was to focus all of his attention on the monumental work of Guernica at the beginning of 1937. Both Walter and Maar played a significant role in the creation of Guernica, with Walter appearing at least twice in the composition. Maar played a more practical role in the development of the work, as she not only documented its progress, but also assisted with its painting.

=== Marie-Thérèse Walter ===
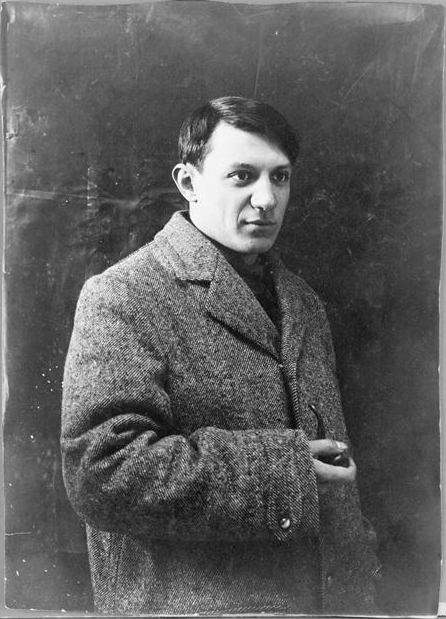
Portrait photograph of Pablo Picasso, 1908

Picasso first met 17-year-old Walter on the street outside Galeries Lafayette in 1927. She was a respectable girl who lived with her mother and sisters in Maisons-Alfort, a suburb of Paris. At the time, Picasso was aged 47 and unhappily married to Olga Khoklova, a Russian ballerina. Picasso approached Walter and asked to paint her portrait. He said, "You have an interesting face, I would like to do a portrait of you. I am Picasso". Walter had no knowledge of who Picasso was, but was flattered by his attention. Within two weeks they had begun a secret affair that was reflected by a change in Picasso's artistic approach. During this period, he created many portraits of Walter, such as Le Repos, which were characterised by sinuous curves that convey her voluptuous form and his great passion for her as his mistress and muse. For Picasso, this new romance offered a kind of rebirth in his personal life, illustrated by symbolic bowls of fruit and flowers, which contrasted with the staid portraits of his wife that he rendered in a formal, neoclassical style. Walter described their relationship, stating, "My life with him was always secret, calm and peaceful. We said nothing to anyone. We were happy like that, and we did not ask anything more." John Richardson, Picasso's friend and biographer opined that, "Picasso was more in love than he had ever been". By 1928, images produced of Picasso's wife were now characterised by tortured forms and jagged lines that display her increasing rage and aggression. In 1934 Khoklova left Picasso and moved out of their apartment following an exhibition that revealed the secret relationship in a series of nude portraits of Walter. On Christmas Eve of 1934, Walter told Picasso that she was pregnant and he promised to get a divorce from Khoklova, which was filed six months later. On 5 September 1935, Walter gave birth to a daughter, Maya, which led to Picasso creating several works depicting his new family. They remained together for over ten years but never married. In the autumn of 1937, Picasso and his family moved to Le Tremblay-sur-Mauldre, but this year also marked the beginning of a new love in his life, in the person of Dora Maar.

=== Dora Maar ===
Two months after the birth of Maya in 1935, Picasso attended the opening of a movie, where he was introduced to Dora Maar, by the French poet Paul Éluard. Born Henriette Théodora Markovitch, she was a talented photographer, an intellectual, and involved in the Surrealist movement. Maar initially trained as a painter in the 1920s but became interested in photography. By 1931, she had opened a studio and renamed herself Dora Maar. Maar and Picasso began a relationship and, in August 1936, Picasso spent time apart from Walter by taking a trip to Mougins with Maar alongside Paul Éluard and his wife, Roland Penrose and his wife, and Man Ray and his mistress. In September 1936, Walter was offered Picasso's home at Le Tremblay-sur-Mauldre, located 28 miles from Paris. This provided Picasso with the freedom to maintain both relationships over a period of three years. Over the course of their relationship, Picasso's portrayals of his mistress changed. Initially he depicted her as a nymph or a bird, but by 1937, his paintings had begun to portray her in tears, most notably in The Weeping Woman. As well as being emotionally fractious, Maar's relationship with Picasso was influential in terms of his artwork and political outlook. Frances Morris, Director of Tate Modern commented, "He trusted her. As much as being a sexual or emotional relationship, it was a collaborative one".

Picasso made efforts to ensure that Walter and Maar would not meet, but eventually they did. According to Picasso, the tension between his two mistresses reached a crisis point in 1937, while he was in the process of finishing Guernica. Picasso related a story to Françoise Gilot of a day when both women had arrived at his studio at the same time and had begun arguing. In her memoir titled Life with Picasso, Gilot recalled that Picasso had said, "I kept on painting and they kept on arguing". Walter had demanded that Picasso should choose between them. Picasso stated, "I was satisfied with things as they were. I told them they'd have to fight it out for themselves. So they began to wrestle. It's one of my choicest memories". Picasso continued to maintain both relationships with his mistresses after the outbreak of World War II. Picasso spent the war in occupied Paris. By 1945, his relationship with Maar had come to an end. Picasso had subjected her to physical and emotional abuse and she consequently suffered a nervous breakdown. After the war, Picasso relocated to the South of France with Françoise Gilot, his new partner, with whom he had two children.

== Description ==
Femme au béret et à la robe quadrillée (Marie-Thérèse Walter) is an oil-on-canvas portrait of Picasso's mistress, which he created on 4 December 1937. It measures 55 x 46 cm and is dated 4 D 37 on the upper right. The painting depicts Walter using a palette of bright colours, bold, black outlines and geometric shapes. She is shown to be wearing a beret and a check dress. Walter's face is portrayed in profile, yet her features are depicted from the front, in a cubist style that is similar to other portraits that Picasso created.

Although Walter's features can clearly be identified as the subject of the painting, there are other elements within the portrait that suggest the presence of Picasso's new lover, Dora Maar, with whom he became involved in 1936. In this portrait, Walter is portrayed as a grown woman, who has matured since meeting Picasso outside Galeries Lafayette in 1927. The portrait illustrates a change in Picasso's feelings towards Walter, in the form of an additional dark silhouette that represents the profile of Maar. The portrait appears to merge the profiles of both women, illustrating that Picasso's affections were moving from one to the other. James Mackie, Sotheby's head of Impressionist & Modern Art noted that, "While substantially this is a portrait of Walter, it’s also a painting about duality." Picasso had previously employed the use of a shadowy silhouette in an earlier painting titled Buste de femme et autoportrait, which he created in 1929 at a time when his marriage to Olga Khokhlova was disintegrating. The painting illustrated the conflict between Picasso and his wife by merging her features with his own. This duality is also evident in a 1937 painting of Walter titled Marie-Thérèse with Red Beret with Pompom, in which the features of Walter and Maar are both present. Maya Ruiz-Picasso commented on this merging of the two women, stating, "My father…never tired of drawing [my mother], painting her, sculpting her, engraving her. But in this painting, it's a combination of my mother and Dora Maar. It's my mother's hair and eyes, but the nose and tones recall Dora Maar, who entered his life in 1936, shortly after I was born".

The combined presence of the two women in Femme au béret et à la robe quadrillée (Marie-Thérèse Walter) is further illustrated by the blurring of artistic styles within the painting. Until this point, Picasso had typically depicted Walter using soft, voluptuous curved lines, while Maar was usually portrayed using sharp, angular shapes. This merging of styles has been considered to be a means for the artist to explore his emotions towards both women. Sotheby's notes that the work displays Picasso's unresolved feelings towards both mistresses, stating, "A vividly realised portrait, it combines his two central muses during this critical period, and achieves the remarkable in encompassing the complexities of real life and revealing simultaneously the artist's contrary emotions".

Palau i Fabre suggests that this painting is one of several portraits of Walter in which she is "entirely reduced to inner tears", and displays "a resigned sadness, and nonetheless suffused with love". He further opines that this is part of a continued theme in which Picasso "had devoted almost all of his activity as a painter to woman, her troubles, her sadness, her loneliness. And, in the course of the past ten years, life had led him to depict two women crying. People speak of Dora Maar but too often forget that Marie-Thérèse has also been seen very often, and earlier, as a weeping woman".

== Provenance ==
The painting was originally in the estate of the artist. It was then held in a private collection. On 28 February 2018, the painting was sold at Sotheby's auction for £49,827,000 to Harry Smith, the chairman of the art appraisal and advisory firm Gurr Johns. It was the most expensive painting ever sold at auction in Europe, and the second most expensive work of art, after Alberto Giacometti's 1861 sculpture The Walking Man.

== See also ==
- Portrait of Dora Maar
- Le Repos
- Girl before a Mirror
