= Le Repos (Picasso) =

1932 painting by Pablo Picasso

Le repos
- Artist: Pablo Picasso
- Year: 1932
- Medium: oil on canvas
- Dimensions: 46 cm × 46 cm (18 1/8 in × 18 1/8 in)

Le Repos (French, 'Rest') is an oil-on-canvas painting created by Pablo Picasso in 1932. It depicts a portrait of Marie-Thérèse Walter, the artist's lover and muse, in a sleeping pose. The painting was produced in the midst of their relationship and is a demonstration of Picasso's love for his mistress. Le Repos was one of a series of sleeping portraits of Walter that Picasso created in 1932. On 14 May 2018, the painting achieved a value of $36.9 million when it was sold at Sotheby's auction.

== Background ==
Picasso first met Marie-Therese Walter on the streets of Paris in 1927, when she was just 17 years of age. Walter would recall the event years later. "I knew nothing - either of life or of Picasso... I had gone to do some shopping at the Galeries Lafayette, and Picasso saw me leaving the Metro. He simply took me by the arm and said, 'I am Picasso! You and I are going to do great things together." At the time, Picasso was aged 46 and unhappily married to Olga Khokhlova, so the relationship with Walter remained a secret. Simon Shaw, co-head of Sotheby's Worldwide Impressionist & Modern Art Department, described Walter as Picasso's "golden muse" and opined that Walter was "arguably the love of his life".

In 1932, Picasso and Walter spent a blissful period of time together at Picasso's recently purchased Château de Boisgeloup. This marked a change in their relationship, as it moved from a clandestine affair to a tranquil and relaxed home life away from Khokhlova. This turning point can also be seen reflected in Picasso's artwork, as it was during this time that his paintings moved away from depicting violent Surrealist distortions to a more gentle depiction of the female form in his portraits of Walter.

Walter was painted by Picasso on numerous occasions in a variety of poses, particularly in notable works like Girl before a Mirror, Le Rêve and Nude, Green Leaves and Bust.

== Description ==
Le Repos was one of several paintings that Picasso created of Walter in the first half of 1932. It is a small canvas, measuring 46 cm x 46 cm. It demonstrates the formidable influence of Walter on Picasso's personal life and art during this period. Walter is depicted asleep, with her head facing upwards and resting on her hands, which are clasped together. This sleeping state would become her signature image. In contrast to other full portraits that Picasso produced of his model, he chose to focus this painting on her facial features, providing an incredibly intimate portrait. By depicting his subject asleep, Picasso conveys both her physical attractiveness and her innocence, a combination which he found particularly alluring.

The sleeping woman was a theme that Picasso explored in numerous works of this period. He said, "When a man watches a woman asleep, he tries to understand". This theme explored the depiction of Walter lost in her subconscious, drawing connections with Picasso's Surrealist works. Picasso was intrigued by dreams and the subconscious, and depicted Walter free of constraint, as an image of serenity and calm.

This set of paintings that focus on Le Repos are differentiated from other portraits by their extreme close ups of the subject's face. The rest of Walter's body has been completely removed from the composition. Picasso filled these paintings entirely with Walter's face, conveying the intimacy of the portraits from the close proximity of her lover's gaze.

During this period, Picasso enjoyed experimenting with a much freer composition to his previous work, categorised by rich colours and sweeping brushwork. This new style represents the renewed energy and romance within his personal life. Picasso particularly made use of yellow and violet hues to convey Walter's hair and skin, and placed her head between complimentary shades of red and green. In an exhibition catalogue for the National Gallery of Victoria, Melbourne & Art Gallery of New South Wales, Patrick McCaughey noted the evolution of Picasso's art in terms of form.

Marie-Thérèse embodied for Picasso an ideal type – love, model and goddess. She offered him a release into sensuality and inspired the series of reclining, sleeping nudes of the early 1930s. Through Marie-Thérèse, Picasso discovered a new amplitude of form; less solemn than the monumental neo-classical nudes of the 1920s and with a promise of abundance and pleasure.

== Exhibition ==
1932 was the year of Picasso's first retrospective exhibition, which was held at Galerie Georges Petit in Paris and Kunsthaus in Zurich. It was as a result of this exhibition that Khokhlova realised that her husband had been having a long-term affair, after witnessing the many canvases that Picasso chose to exhibit featuring intimate portraits of Walter. This marked a transition in Picasso's artwork, which now openly showcased Walter as his muse. In an exhibition catalogue, Robert Rosenblum wrote about the importance of this event in Picasso's artwork.

Marie-Thérèse, now firmly entrenched in both the city and country life of a lover twenty-eight years her senior, could at last emerge from the wings to center stage, where she could preside as a radiant deity, in new roles that changed from Madonna to sphinx, from odalisque to earth mother. At times her master seems to worship humbly at her shrine, capturing a fixed, confrontational stare of almost supernatural power; but more often, he becomes an ecstatic voyeur, who quietly captures his beloved, reading, meditating, catnapping, or surrendering to the deepest abandon of sleep.

== Provenance ==
Galerie Georges Petit, Paris

Zwemmer Gallery, London (acquired by 1948)

Marlborough Fine Art, Ltd., London

Illa Kodicek, London - sold at Christie's, London, 23 June 1993

Private Collection, London - sold at Sotheby's, New York, 9 November 2000

On 14 May 2018, the painting, which was owned by Bill Gross, sold at Sotheby's auction for $36.9 million.

== Significance and legacy ==
John Richardson referred to the period in which Picasso focused his artwork on Walter as, "his most innovative period since cubism".

Christie's comments on the significance of these sleeping portraits of Walter. "Picasso's frequent portrayals of Marie-Thérèse sleeping provided the ideal platform for his eloquent, sensual, romantic visions of her, hinting at the languid eroticism of their lifestyle in the secluded château, while also tapping into her character."

Sotheby's described the painting as, "a stunning and intimate depiction of Picasso’s 'golden muse'."

This classic, dreamy example from his critical year of 1932 is immediately recognizable, and captures the key elements of his work inspired by Marie Therese. Its lush, painterly quality and vibrant colors stand in stark contrast to Picasso's final portraits of his first wife, Olga Khokhlova, which immediately precede this extraordinary period – generally considered the strongest in Picasso's entire career."

== See also ==
- Woman in a Red Armchair
- Girl before a Mirror
- Le Rêve
