= Femme au Chien =

Painting by Pablo Picasso

- Artist: Pablo Picasso
- Year: 1962
- Medium: oil on canvas
- Dimensions: 162 cm × 130 cm (63.75 in × 51.25 in)
- Location: Wynn Fine Art, Florida

Femme au Chien (English: Woman with dog) is an oil-on-canvas painting by Pablo Picasso, which he painted in 1962. It is a portrait of Picasso's second wife, Jacqueline Roque, and their dog Kaboul, an Afghan Greyhound. The painting is an illustration of the great affection that Picasso displayed for both of the subjects in the portrait and has elements of the cubist style that he pioneered. It was produced in Picasso's later years when the couple was living at Notre-Dame-de-Vie, near Mougins, France. On 14 May 2019, it was sold at Sotheby's auction for almost $55 million and is now housed in the collection of Wynn Fine Art in Florida.

== Background ==
Femme au Chien is one of six paintings that Picasso created depicting his second wife, Jacqueline Roque and his dog Kaboul. Picasso was particularly fond of dogs, a subject which dated back to his early artistic career and featured in many of his artworks. Picasso's affection for dogs is evident in artworks as early as Garçon au chien, which he produced in 1905. In his later years, he was perpetually surrounded by a menagerie of animals either at home or in his studio, including his dachshund Lump, his Afghan hounds Kasbek and Kaboul and his boxer Jan.

=== Jacqueline Roque ===
Picasso met Roque in Madoura in 1952, after she started working at Madoura Pottery in Vallauris. She became his model and they eventually began a relationship. At the time, Picasso was still in a relationship with Françoise Gilot, with whom he had two children, Paloma and Claude. Gilot soon left Picasso, allowing Roque and Picasso to move in together in 1954. Picasso was by this point in his early seventies, while Roque was in her late twenties. Despite the age gap, they were devoted to each other and married in 1961. William Rubin remarked that, "Jacqueline’s understated, gentle, and loving personality combined with her unconditional commitment to [Picasso] provided an emotionally stable life and a dependable foyer over a longer period of time than he had ever before enjoyed". Three months after their wedding, in June 1961, the couple moved into Notre-Dame-de-Vie, a farmhouse near Mougins, where Picasso spent the remaining years of his life. Picasso's love for Roque is reflected in the numerous paintings that he produced of her, which exceeded the number of portraits that he produced of his other lovers. Roque remained Picasso's wife until his death in 1973. She eventually committed suicide in 1986 following the death of her husband.

=== Kaboul ===
Kaboul entered Picasso's life in October 1961 as a gift from Jean Leymarie for Picasso's 80th birthday. After just a few weeks Picasso began to include the dog in his artwork. Kaboul was both a fierce guard dog and a faithful, affectionate companion. He outlived Picasso and remained with Roque at Notre-Dame-de-Vie until his death in 1975.

Picasso produced a number of portraits of Roque alongside their dog Kaboul, including Femme et Chien Sous un Arbre, which he painted from 1961 to 1962. In his portraits he often merged the features of woman and hound. He once remarked on Kaboul's influence on his work stating, "often, if he comes into my mind when I am working, it alters what I do. The nose on the face I am drawing gets longer and sharper. The hair of the woman I am sketching gets longer and fluffy, resting against her cheeks just as his ears rest against his head".

Roque adored Kaboul and shared a close relationship with the dog. Boris Friedwald noted that, "As of 1960, Lump [Picasso's dachshund] had a new companion, Kaboul, named after the Afghan capital—and rightly so, because he was an Afghan Greyhound. Jacqueline Roque, whom Picasso had married in 1961, was in love with Kaboul. And soon the animal, which was to accompany Picasso up to the end of his life, was appearing in several portraits of Jacqueline Roque. No wonder the features of Kaboul can be subtly traced in her visage".

== Description ==
Femme au Chien is a large oil-on-canvas painting measuring 162 x 130 cm. It was signed by Picasso on the upper left and dated on the reverse. The painting depicts Roque seated next to Kaboul and displays Picasso's affection for both subjects. It also reflects the influence that Roque had on Picasso's life during this period. Picasso produced the painting from November 1962 and completed it in the following month.

Picasso's rendering of Roque is indicative of her significance and status as his wife and muse. In this portrait she is depicted enthroned on an armchair in a regal manner, enhanced by the placement of Kaboul at her side. Hélène Parmelin often visited Mougins and remarked on Picasso's portraits of Roque and Kaboul, "Picasso had just been showing us serious faces with huge close-set eyes, sort of Mona Lisas with elongated hands, a multiplication of women seated in their dresses with the Afghan hound Kaboul close against the folds of their skirts... 'They are the Dames de Mougins,' [he said]. 'The queens, the beloved ones, the Jacquelines, all watching us at once with an incomparable serenity".

The painting is an example of Picasso's many portraits that he produced of the women in his life seated in an armchair. This recurring motif exists in numerous portraits of his lovers throughout his artistic career painted in a variety of artistic styles and serves as a reflection of his relationship with each of his muses. Marie-Laure Bernadac commented on Picasso's treatment of women in his portraits.

It is characteristic of Picasso that he takes as his model—or as his Muse—the woman he loves and who loves with him, not a professional model. So what his paintings show is never a 'model' of a woman, but woman as model. This has its consequences for his emotional as well as his artistic life: for the beloved woman stands for 'painting', and the painted woman is the beloved: detachment is an impossibility. Picasso never paints from life: Jacqueline never poses for him; but she is there always, everywhere. All the women of these years are Jacqueline, and yet they are rarely portraits. The image of the woman he loves is a model imprinted deep within him, and it emerges every time he paints a woman.

== Provenance ==
The painting was previously owned by Galerie Louise Leiris, Paris, Galerie Beyeler, Basel, and a private collector in Japan who acquired it on 6 April 1990. On 14 May 2019, the painting was sold at Sotheby's auction for $54,936,000 to Wynn Fine Art, the art venture of Steve Wynn.

== Significance and legacy ==
Sotheby's commented on the significance of the painting stating, "Femme au chien, in its bold use of color, complexity and completeness of composition and monumental scale ensure that his canvas is one of Picasso's most evocative portraits of his wife during their years at Notre Dame de Vie and a masterpiece of the artist's late period".

== Other works ==
Another painting of Roque and Kaboul titled Femme au Chien was painted by Picasso on 13 November 1962. It was sold at Christie's auction for $6.3 million on 7 November 2012.

== See also ==
- Dora Maar au Chat
- The Weeping Woman
- Woman in a Red Armchair
- 1962 in art
