= Woman in Hat and Fur Collar =

Painting by Pablo Picasso

Woman in Hat and Fur Collar (Marie-Therese Walter)
- Artist: Pablo Picasso
- Year: 1937
- Medium: Oil on Canvas
- Dimensions: 61 cm × 50 cm (24 in × 20 in)
- Location: Museu Nacional d'Art de Catalunya; Barcelona

The Woman in Hat and Fur Collar (Marie-Thérèse Walter) is a painting by Pablo Picasso executed in 1937 and exhibited at the National Art Museum of Catalonia (Museu Nacional d'Art de Catalunya) in Barcelona, Spain.

== History ==
It was painted in Paris in 1937, and is one of the numerous portraits Picasso did of Marie-Thérèse Walter, his lover between 1927 and 1935, approximately, and the mother of his daughter Maya.

In these portraits, Picasso carries out an exhaustive analytic exercise in which the youth and personality of Marie-Thérèse are subjected to a thousand metamorphic transfigurations. The artist merges the frontal view of the face and the profile into a single image and turns the model into an icon of sensuality by means of a rich pictorial language in which the distorted forms marked the consolidation of the so-called 'Picasso style'. The portrait is at the same time epilogue to the confrontation between the two essential models of the moment, Marie-Thérèse and Dora Maar. Despite the distorted forms, the diverging eyes and the angular features, this portrait is easily identifiable because, like the ones he did at the same time of Nusch, Paul Éluard's second wife, and of Dora Maar, it preserves the sitter's essential features.

The clear connection of Picasso's works and his love life is taken for granted today, and when his art of the early 1930s is discussed, the growing phrased used is "the Marie-Therese period." Picasso's affair with Marie-Therese was a secret, and she would gradually usurp the throne then occupied by Olga Khokhlova, the artist's legal wife. Marie-Therese will be subject to constant transformations. Some range from portraits that are instantly recognizable to transcendent universal symbols. Fantastic reinventions of the human body were always at the core of Picasso's genius. In Woman in Hat and Fur Collar, the artist shows her facial profile and frontal view in the same painting. She is looking to viewers both left and right.

In his work, woman is the vehicle for the expression of intense emotion, but the feelings expressed are those of humanity at large: far from being the other, she is the self.

== Collection history ==
When the MNAC opened in 2004, there were some gaps in content especially with respect to modern artists. One of the most absent was Picasso. The work entered the museum in 2007, one of a set of 8 pieces that are part of a group and fills many gaps in the artist's career.

Details of the work: Oil on canvas Painted in Paris, on December 4, 1937. The painting is not signed but dated as "4D37" in the upper right corner. It is a deposit of State since 2007, the company Albertis Foundation joined the museum MNAC reference number 214090.

== Exhibits ==
In addition to being in the museum's collection, the picture was shown in the following exhibitions:

- Picasso. De la caricatura a les metamorfosis d'estil (From caricature to metamorphosis), Barcelona, Museu Picasso 2003.

== See also ==
- List of Picasso artworks 1931–1940
- Dora Maar au Chat
