= Woman's Head (Picasso) =

1939 painting by Pablo Picasso

Woman's Head (1939)

Woman's Head is a 1939 oil-on-canvas painting by Pablo Picasso. It is a depiction of Dora Maar, Picasso's companion at the time. Picasso donated the work to the people of Greece in recognition of their resistance against the Axis during the Second World War. Woman's Head was first exhibited in 1949, alongside other donated works, at the Institut Français in Athens. It was not shown again until an exhibition starting in 1980 at the National Gallery and was on continuous show from 2011 until the gallery closed for renovation in 2012. In January 2012 Woman's Head was stolen from the closed gallery, alongside a painting by Piet Mondrian. It was recovered from a gorge near Athens in June 2021 and the alleged thief was arrested.

== Painting ==
The painting is a cubist abstract depiction of the bust of a woman and was completed in 1939. The subject is the French photographer Dora Maar, a companion of Picasso between 1936 and 1943. Maar was also depicted by Picasso in The Weeping Woman and Portrait of Dora Maar. Woman's Head appears in a 1940 photograph taken by Maar at Picasso's studio in Rouen, Picasso having moved from his Paris studio during the German occupation.

After the war Picasso gave the work to the people of Greece in recognition of their country's fight against the Axis from 1940 to 1945. Picasso wrote on the back of the painting: "Pour le people Grec. Hommage de Picasso 14/10/1939" (French: "for the Greek people. A tribute by Picasso"). The work was first exhibited at the Institut Français in Athens in 1949. It appeared alongside works donated by other French artists, including Henri Matisse, Pierre Bonnard and Francis Picabia, amounting to 28 paintings, 6 drawings, 6 engravings, 4 sculptures and 2 books.

The works were not exhibited again until they appeared at the National Gallery in Athens in 1980. After a long exhibition Woman's Head returned to storage until summer 2007 when it was exhibited as part of a celebration of the centenary of the Institut Français. The work was last shown as part of the exhibition In the Sanctuary of the National Gallery, being on display from October 2011 until 2012 when the museum closed for extensive renovation and extension. In 2021 the work was valued at 16.5 million euros.

== 2012 theft ==
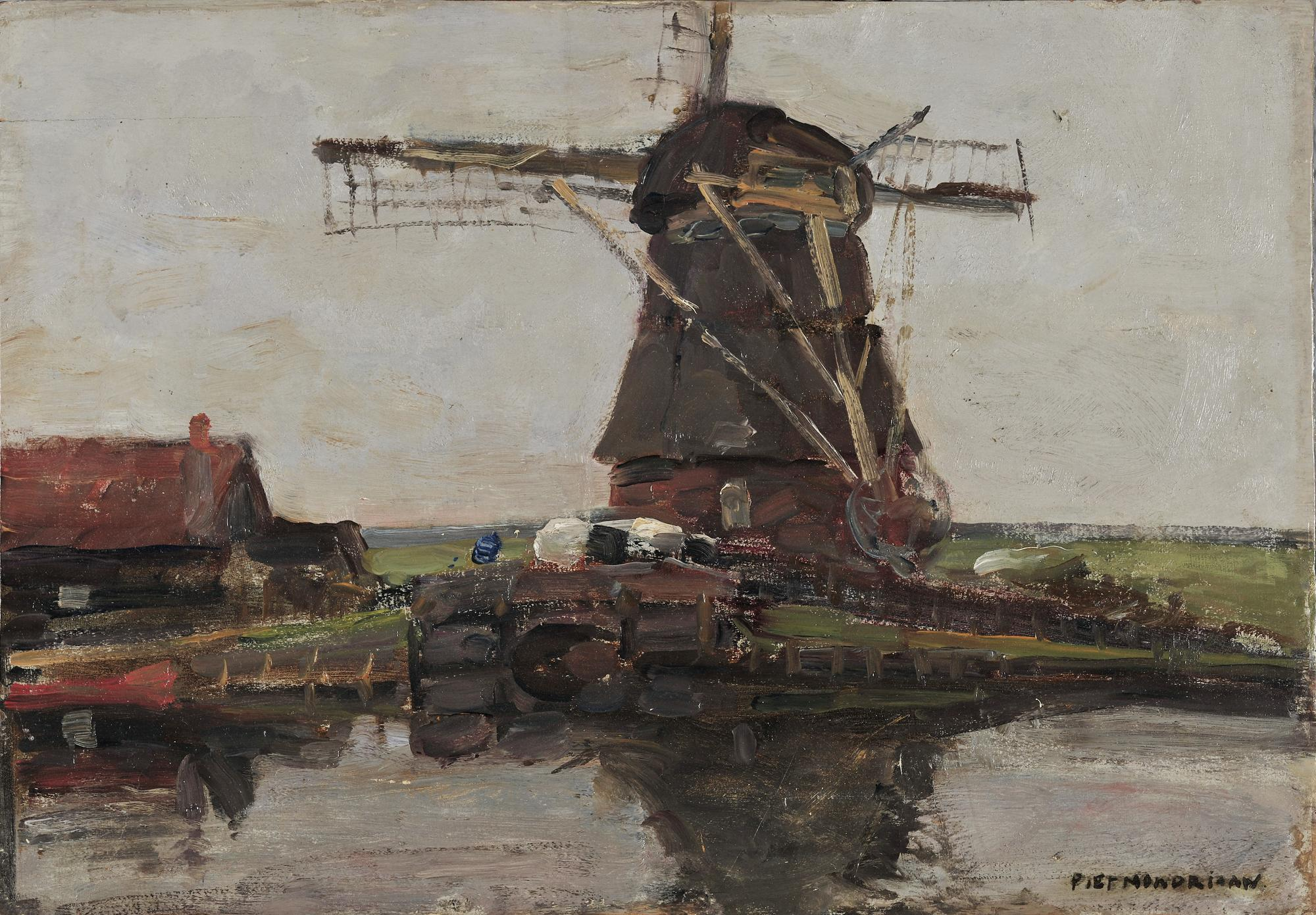
Piet Mondriaan, Stammer Mill With Summer House, National Gallery of Athens

Woman's Head was one of two paintings stolen during a 9 January 2012 theft from the closed National Gallery, that was referred to as the "theft of the century". Police allege that a thief entered the gallery via an unlocked balcony door whilst an accomplice kept watch outside (the man later arrested for the theft claimed to have worked alone). Police stated that the thief triggered a number of security alarms as a means of distracting the guard before taking Woman's Head and Piet Mondrian’s Stammer Mill With Summer House. A third painting, another Mondrian, was dropped by the thief during his escape. The thief took the paintings to a basement where he removed them from their frames with a pocket knife. A 16th-century sketch by Guglielmo Caccia was also lost during the raid, the arrested man claiming to have used it to wipe blood from his cut hand during the raid and then flushing it down a toilet. Police claimed that the thief had watched the Gallery carefully for six months prior to the theft. Woman's Head was the most significant of those stolen for its value and historical significance.

In June 2021 Greek police arrested a man for the theft. He was said to be a painter working in construction but also at warehouses who was a Picasso enthusiast. He had been accused of shoplifting as a youth but had no art-related criminal record. Police had been tracking him for two months before his June 2021 arrest. Police alleged that the thief kept the artworks at his home before, suspecting that the police were following him, moving them to a warehouse and then a gorge. The Mondrian painting and Woman's Head were recovered together from the gorge, some 28 miles (45 km) south-east of Athens.

Police held a news conference after the arrest at which the two paintings were shown to the press. The paintings were displayed on a thin ledge and Woman's Head slipped and fell to the ground, before being replaced. It appeared, superficially, to have suffered no damage from the incident. The Caccia sketch remains missing, though a similar sketch, attributed to Caccia, was shown in the online catalog of a Florence auction house in September 2019 but was removed from listing when its provenance was questioned.
