= Girl with a Red Beret and Pompom =

Painting by Pablo Picasso

Girl with a Red Beret and Pompom. Pablo Picasso, oil on canvas, 1937.

Girl with a Red Beret and Pompom is a 1937 painting by Pablo Picasso. It hangs in the main reception area of the private member's club Annabel's in Berkeley Square in London's Mayfair district.

The painting depicts Picasso's lover Marie-Thérèse Walter. It was one of a series of Thérèse Walter painted by Picasso in December 1937. A portrait of Thérèse Walter painted the previous day to the Girl with a Red Beret and Pompom sold in 2013 for £7.5 million at Christie's auction house in New York. Picasso's daughter by Thérèse Walter, Maya Ruiz-Picasso, feels that Girl with a Red Beret and Pompom depicts both her mother and the woman that Picasso left her for, Dora Maar. Ruiz-Picasso said that "My father...never tired of drawing [my mother], painting her, sculpting her, engraving her. But in this painting, it's a combination of my mother and Dora Maar. It's my mother's hair and eyes, but the nose and tones recall Dora Maar, who entered his life in 1936, shortly after I was born".

It was bought by the British businessman Richard Caring in 2017 for a price believed to be between £20-30 million. Caring "renamed" the painting Annabel after Annabel's, the private member's club in Berkeley Square. The club itself was established by Mark Birley in 1963 and was named for Birley's wife, Annabel Goldsmith. Caring bought the club in 2007. The art critic Jonathan Jones, writing in The Guardian, felt that what "[Caring] has done, with laughable arrogance, is to try to short-circuit the complex, elusive processes by which works of art pick up their nicknames over the centuries. But we should not be so religious about the names we pin on art. They distract us from looking at the image. As acts of idiocy go, this is therefore enlightening. A Picasso by any other name still has wonky eyes and a nose going off for a walk". The Times reported that it was staff at Annabel's who had given the painting its new nickname in February 2018.

== See also ==
- List of Picasso artworks 1931–1940
- 1937 in art
