= Girl before a Mirror =

1932 painting by Pablo Picasso

- Artist: Pablo Picasso
- Year: 1932
- Catalogue: 78311
- Medium: Oil on canvas
- Dimensions: 162.3 cm × 130.2 cm (63.9 in × 51.3 in)
- Location: Museum of Modern Art, New York City
- Accession: 2.1938

Girl before a Mirror (French: Jeune fille devant un miroir) is an oil on canvas painting by Pablo Picasso, which he created in 1932. The painting is a portrait of Picasso's mistress and muse, Marie-Thérèse Walter, who is depicted standing in front of a mirror looking at her reflection. It has been in the permanent collection of the Museum of Modern Art in New York City since 1938.

== Background ==
This painting was produced in 1932, a significant year in Picasso's artistic career. By this point in his life, Picasso had already reached the age of 51 and had established his reputation as an important artist. In 1932, Galerie Georges Petit presented a retrospective exhibition of his work, which was an unusual event for an artist, with Picasso taking control of the curation. This was also a highly productive year for Picasso, in which he focused many of his works on his 22-year-old mistress and muse Marie-Thérèse Walter. His 1932 portraits of her were the first public display of their secret affair during his marriage to Olga Khokhlova.

Several months after completing this portrait, Picasso stated, "The body of work one creates is a form of diary", alluding to the autobiographical nature of the work. Alfred H. Barr Jr., Director of The Museum of Modern Art, reported that Picasso had said that he "preferred this painting to any of the others in the long series he had completed that spring".

=== Marie-Thérèse Walter ===
Walter was Picasso's mistress from January 1927 until 1941. Their first meeting occurred outside Galeries Lafayette in Paris, when Walter was aged 17 and Picasso was 45. He introduced himself by saying, "You have an interesting face, I would like to do a portrait of you. I am Picasso". His marriage to Olga Khokhlova was strained, due to his infidelities. As a result, Picasso's affair with Walter had to initially remain a secret.

Françoise Gilot, Picasso's partner from 1944 to 1953, commented, "I could see that she was certainly the woman who had inspired Pablo plastically more than any other. She had a very arresting face with a Grecian profile. The whole series of portraits of blonde women Pablo painted between 1927 and 1935 are almost exact replicas of her".

In 1930, Picasso decided to purchase Château de Boisgeloup, a country house 45 miles northwest of Paris. This allowed him to spend time with Walter away from his wife on weekends. Despite being unaware of Picasso's relationship with Walter, Olga eventually uncovered the truth in a series of nude portraits that Picasso showcased at the retrospective exhibition at Galerie Georges Petit in October 1932. Many of Picasso's portraits of his mistress contained symbolism which was sexually charged, most notably in Le Rêve. By 1934, Olga's rage reached a crisis point and she left the apartment in Paris. In the same year on Christmas Eve, Walter informed Picasso that she was pregnant and he promised that he would file for divorce. She eventually gave birth to a daughter, Maya, on 5 September 1935. The couple stayed in a relationship for more than ten years, but never married.

== Description ==
Girl Before a Mirror is portrait of Picasso's mistress, Marie-Thérèse Walter, which he created on 14 March 1932. It is signed by Picasso in white paint in the top left corner and dated on the reverse. The painting measures 162.3 cm x 130.2 cm and was created using oils on canvas. It is an image of a woman looking at her reflection in a mirror, which reveals a darker version of herself. The woman's face has been divided into two halves, one of which is presented in a calm, lilac hue, while the other is painted roughly in bright, yellow paint. The reflection offers another representation of the subject, in which she appears to be older and her face sunken, perhaps as an image of her mortality. In the background a vivid diamond pattern completes the scene, which is reminiscent of the harlequin with which Picasso so often identified in previous works.

The composition is a complex arrangement of luminous colours and lines, compartmentalised into sections, which has resulted in the painting being likened to a stained-glass window or cloisonné enamel. Multiple layers in the paint show that it was reworked by Picasso to produce the final dense and compressed image. In this composition, Picasso used elements of Cubism to break apart the form of the woman. She is portrayed from the side, yet her reflection depicts her from the front. The organic nature of this portrait also displays a Surrealist style dating from the 1920s and 1930s.

Picasso's use of bright colours in this painting is reminiscent of the work of other artists. This period in his artistic career is often referred to as his "Gauguin phase", due to the use of the harmonising tones of lavender and yellow used in the woman's face, which can be seen in Paul Gauguin's artwork. The patterns and bright colours present in this painting have also been likened to the work of Henri Matisse.

Girl Before a Mirror is an illustration of Picasso's departure from traditional painting techniques, such as texture and tonality in the representation of the subject. In contrast to these traditions, Picasso depicted his muse with flat blocks of colour covering an entire spectrum. There is little use of light and dark that would normally be used to convey the volume of objects and no representation of texture, such as the woman's hair or skin. Picasso instead emphasised the two-dimensional nature of the canvas and paint. The image is abstract, as it depicts the woman's form unrealistically, using curvilinear lines and circular shapes to convey the fullness of her anatomy and her fertility. The composition has been carefully constructed to offset the curvilinear forms of the woman's figure with the geometric diamond pattern that frames her.

== Interpretations ==
Girl Before a Mirror has been noted for its complex symbolism. The art historian Robert Rosenblum drew attention to the duality of the subject's face, which on one side has been painted smoothly in a delicate tone and, on the other side, with a garish, bright colour. This has been considered as contrasting references to youth and old age or light and darkness. Rosenblum states that Picasso is "merging... one of the most pervasive cultural myths about women inherited from the nineteenth century, the polarity between virgin and whore, archetypes that haunted Picasso from his earliest years."

Anne Umland comments on the relationship between the woman and her reflection, remarking that the image "reinvents the time-honored artistic theme of a woman before her mirror in radically modern terms, tinged by the mortal associations of traditional Vanity images and by powerful psychic overtones".

Picasso's rendering of the reflection in the mirror has been described by Debbie Goldberg at the Museum of Modern Art as a depiction of Death. Picasso made reference to other artworks within his compositions and may have been influenced by a painting belonging to a friend which was an image of Death holding up a mirror to a woman. The prevailing theme of this is memento mori or "remember that life is brief". Picasso also combined the elements of sex and death in his works, most notably in Les Demoiselles d’Avignon. To illustrate this theme, Picasso depicted the subject reflected in the mirror as both somber and voluptuous, indicating a transformation of the traditional subject of vanitas by combining sensuality and death.

== See also ==
- Le Rêve
- Nude, Green Leaves and Bust
- Femme au béret et à la robe quadrillée (Marie-Thérèse Walter)
