= Femme à la montre =

1932 painting by Pablo Picasso

- Artist: Pablo Picasso
- Year: 1932
- Medium: Oil on canvas
- Subject: Marie-Thérèse Walter
- Dimensions: 130 cm × 97 cm (51 in × 38 in)

Femme à la montre ('Woman with a Watch') is a 1932 oil-on-canvas portrait by Pablo Picasso of his muse Marie-Thérèse Walter. Painted during Picasso's annus mirabilis, the work depicts Walter sitting upright in an armchair.

In 2023, the painting was sold by Sotheby's for a price of 139.4 million USD, the second-highest paid at an auction for a work by Picasso.

== Background ==
In 1927, when he was still married to the ballerina Olga Khokhlova, Picasso met the 17-year-old Marie-Thérèse Walter outside the Galeries Lafayette in Paris. (Note: Khokhlova was born in Nizhyn in modern-day Ukraine. Some sources describe Khokhlova as Ukrainian, some describe her as Russian, and some describe her as Russian-Ukrainian.) The two began an affair within a week, and Walter became what many sources called his "golden muse". Because of the age disparity – Picasso was 51 years old at the time – and the fact that Picasso was still married, the couple was secretive about the relationship and had kept it hidden even from some of Picasso's closest associates. (Note: Initially, Walter told her mother that she had found a job, but her mother and sisters eventually learned of the relationship, and Walter's mother became friendly with Picasso.) Covert references to Walter began to appear in Picasso's work, such as a musical instrument, a shadowy presence, or even her initials – "MT".

The year that Picasso painted Femme à la montre, 1932, is considered his annus mirabilis, or "year of wonders". That year, a retrospective exhibition of Picasso's works was held at the Galerie Georges Petit in Paris. Likely one of the most important exhibitions of his life, the show was also the first time Picasso revealed to the public the nature of his affair with Walter, with many of the more recent works being portraits of Walter in a state of undress. The exhibition was hugely successful and firmly established Picasso's reputation as a famous – and controversial – artist. Not long after the end of the exhibition, Picasso painted Femme à la montre.

== Description ==
Femme à la montre is an oil-on-canvas painting that depicts Walter sitting upright in an armchair in front of a brilliant blue background. Walter is wearing a green dress and a wristwatch in the painting. Compared to Picasso's earlier works from his Cubist period, there is an emphasis on curves.

Picasso's signature can be found at the top left of the work. On the painting's stretcher, he wrote the date "17 Août XXXII" ('17 August 1932').

== Provenance ==
The Swiss art dealer and collector Ernst Beyeler first purchased Femme à la montre from Picasso in 1966, when he was invited to Picasso's studio in Mougins on the French Riviera to personally select what he wished to purchase from Picasso's collection. The work was then briefly in the hands of the Pace Gallery in New York when they acquired it in 1968 from the Galerie Beyeler in Basel, Switzerland. It was bought from Pace by the art patron and philanthropist Emily Fisher Landau in November of that year. The painting was one of the first significant works of art that Landau acquired, and she hung it above the mantel in her apartment in Manhattan. (Note: Sotheby's states that the work remained above her mantel until 2023, while CBS News reports that Landau eventually placed it on display at the Fisher Landau Center in Long Island City, Queens.)

After Landau died in 2023 at the age of 102, the painting was placed on auction at Sotheby's in New York City, where it was sold on 8 November 2023 for 139.4 million USD, to an anonymous party that had bid over the phone. The price was the second-highest paid at an auction for a work by Picasso, following the price of US$179.4 million paid for his 1955 Les Femmes d'Alger (Version O) when it was sold in 2015 by Christie's in New York. (Note: At the time, the 2015 sale set a world record for the highest price paid at an auction for a work of art.) The sale was part of an auction of several works in Landau's estate, which fetched a total of US$424.7 million, setting a record for the most valuable collection of art from a female collector ever sold. (Note: Earlier sources report the value of 406.4 million USD for the collection, which only covered the 31 lots sold during the first night and not the 80 lots sold the following day for 18.3 million USD.)

== See also ==
- List of most expensive paintings
