= Woman in a Red Armchair =

1929 painting by Pablo Picasso

- Artist: Pablo Picasso
- Year: 1929
- Medium: Oil on canvas
- Movement: Surrealism; Cubism
- Dimensions: 65.1 cm × 54 cm (25 in × 21 in)
- Location: Menil Collection

Woman in a Red Armchair (French: Femme au fauteuil rouge) is an oil on canvas painting by artist Pablo Picasso. It was painted in 1929 and is housed at the Menil Collection in Houston, Texas. The painting was influenced by Surrealism and may be a portrait of Picasso's first wife, Olga Khokhlova, whom he married in 1918. It was vandalised while on display in 2012, but quickly restored.

== Background ==
Throughout his life, Picasso had seven serious relationships with women, which are clearly reflected in his artwork as a form of visual diary. Several of these relationships resulted in psychological trauma for the women involved, including his first wife, Olga Khokhlova, who developed a hatred for the artist after their relationship ended. Picasso appeared to be aware of the psychological impact caused by his relationships, as he told his biographer John Richardson, "It must be painful for a girl to see in a painting that she's on the way out." This process of documenting the deterioration of his relationships can be seen in his works, such as Head of a Woman (1927), Head on a Red Background (1928) and The Kiss (1931). Picasso's ambivalence towards women has been the subject of debate. However, Curator Judi Freeman at Los Angeles County Museum opined that "no way did Picasso hate women - he couldn't live without them".

Picasso married Khokhlova, a Russian ballerina, in 1918, but quickly grew bored of her lifestyle. In the early stages of their marriage, he depicted her with elegance and sentimentality in works like Olga Koklova in an Armchair (1917) and Mother and Child (1922). However, this changed over time as their love waned, as can be seen in her portrayal in Seated Woman (1927). From this point, Picasso changed his palette from muted tones to intense, saturated colour, and his sharp, angular lines were transformed to round, soft forms. Picasso's dramatic change in style can be attributed to his meeting of 17-year-old Marie-Thérèse Walter, who was to become his mistress for the next nine years.

== Description ==
This painting resembles a traditional portrait of a woman sitting in an armchair, but Picasso has deconstructed the subject so that she is unrecognisable. The woman is considered to bear a likeness to Picasso's wife, Olga Khokhlova, but she may be an unnamed model. After marrying in 1918, the couple separated about ten years later, roughly two years before this painting was created. Picasso changed his depictions of Khokhlova over the course of their relationship, moving from an affectionate to a more sinister portrayal. During the 1920s, Picasso was influenced by the Surrealist movement, which can be seen by the distortion in this portrait.

== Vandalism ==
On 13 June 2012, Woman in a Red Armchair was vandalised while on display at the Menil Collection by a 22-year-old man named Uriel Landeros, who stencilled a small image of a bullfighter killing a bull and the word "conquista" on the work, which means "conquer" or "conquest". Landeros was sentenced to two years in prison for felony graffiti and criminal mischief, and the painting was restored. The vandal claimed that he had not intended to damage the painting, but did it "to turn heads, to raise awareness". This act of vandalism was similar to the defacing of Guernica in 1974.

== See also ==
- Nude in a Black Armchair
- Portrait of Dora Maar
- The Weeping Woman
