= Jacqueline (painting) =

Painting by Pablo Picasso

- Artist: Pablo Picasso
- Year: 1961
- Medium: Oil paint on canvas
- Movement: Cubist
- Subject: Jacqueline Roque
- Location: Private collection, Paris

Jacqueline is an oil painting by Pablo Picasso, created in 1961. The New York Times described it as "a black, gray and white Cubist oil of Jacqueline Roque, Picasso’s second wife."

On February 28, 2007, the painting was one of two stolen from the home of Picasso's granddaughter Diana Widmaier-Picasso. The other was Maya with Doll. On August 7, 2007, French officials announced that both paintings had been recovered. The paintings were found in Paris and the thieves, who were known to the police for previous cases of art theft, were arrested.
