= Minotauromachy =

Etching by Pablo Picasso

Minotauromachy (La Minotauromachie) is a 19.5 by 27.4” etching and engraving created by Spanish artist Pablo Picasso in Paris in 1935. The etching and resulting prints, literally entitled Minotaur Battle, feature many compositional aspects and themes seen often in Picasso’s art throughout the 1930s. These include the Minotaur, an unconscious or dying female matador on an injured horse, a young girl holding a candle and flowers, a man scaling a ladder, and two women watching with doves from a window. Created during a time of personal turmoil within which Picasso created little artwork, Minotauromachy stands out as a seminal and striking piece with no shortage of artistic interpretations.

== Creation ==
Minotauromachy was created in a series of seven plates from March to May 1935. Each engraved plate represents a different stage in Picasso’s artistic process. The entire edition of prints numbers at least 50, and only eight of these prints are known to come from the final edition. Even the artist himself did not know how many prints of the final edition were made.

== Composition ==
The painting is vertically divided in half by the corner of the house in the background. The lighter colored right side, features the Minotaur in front of an open sea with a sunburst cloud and a lone sailboat on the far horizon. The left side contains more somber tones, with the only source of light coming from the candle held by the young girl. The girl is viewed from above by two women on a balcony and framed on the left by a lightly colored, almost naked man climbing a ladder. The wounded female bullfighter lying across her injured horse divides the scene. The scene appears to have its own movement of action departing from the minotaur with his outstretched arm, passing over the wounded horse and female bullfighter, toward the child, and turning upward toward the man on the ladder, and closing with the two women and doves on the balcony.

== Context ==
=== Personal life ===
1935 was a year that Picasso would later describe as, “the worst time in my life.” His mistress Marie-Thérèse Walter was pregnant and his first wife Olga Khokhlova had just moved away amid their floundering marriage. Picasso’s work from 1935 only includes 26 catalogued paintings and drawings, scant by his standard. Most of these pieces come from earlier in the year, especially around when Marie-Thérèse received confirmation of her pregnancy in February, and seem to contain recurring themes of pregnancy and figures bearing resemblance to Marie-Thérèse. After February, Picasso could hardly bring himself to paint and instead turned increasingly toward poetry as an outlet. Aside from some angry drawings in April, Picasso created no other notable works. Minotauromachy is the only exception.

=== Relation to other works ===
The Minotaur made many appearances in Picasso’s work throughout the 1930s, such as in The Minotaur (1933), Dying Minotaur (1933), and Blind Minotaur, a 1934 drawing of a sightless and suffering minotaur being led along by a flower carrying young girl resembling the one in Minotauromachy. The profile of Marie-Thérèse also appeared often during these years as a gentle onlooker over scenes of crisis. Her features can be seen in the women in the balcony, and also unmistakably in the wounded matador.

=== Guernica ===
Minotauromachy is also often referenced as an important precursor to Picasso’s famous 1937 painting Guernica, which was created in response to the bombing of Guernica in the Spanish Civil War. The two images share a number of similar elements and symbols. Both contain depictions of aggression in the right side of the composition. They also both depict a lightbearer, though Minotauromachy’s is a little girl and Guernica’s is larger, almost superhuman, and bursts into the image. Additionally, the bull in Guernica, though it resembles the Minotaur, is just a head and not a Minotaur at all. The wounded horse is also depicted in both Minotauromachy and Guernica.

== Symbolism and interpretations ==
The scene in Minotauromachy, often described as distinctly allegorical, has no shortage of interpretations. In fact so many different interpretations are offered that art historian William Rubin gives this distinct warning: “As a kind of private allegory the Minotauromachy tempts the interpreter. But explanation, whether poetic or pseudo-psychoanalytical, would necessarily be subjective.”

In his 1983 book Guernica by Picasso, Eberhard Fisch describes the piece as giving a general impression of “darkness, appalling menace, suffering, and hope.” To him, the scene isn’t simply a series of actions but rather an allegorical portrayal of the various stages of response to an inhuman and ominous threat. Each figure depicts a different reaction such as suffering, defeat, numb waiting, safety, or discreet retreat in the face of peril.

The aesthetic realist Chaim Koppelman interprets it through the lens of Aesthetic Realism which claims that the only thing that satisfies humans is good will. The Minotaur reaching toward the light depicts the wrestling of self between savage brutality and the goodwill he strives toward, illustrating the duality of power and tenderness in man.

Another point of interpretation addresses the rapier, the wounded matador’s weapon. Mary Gedo, in her book Picasso, Art as Autobiography explains that the rapier’s angle makes it at first appear to be held by the Minotaur, a symbol that might denote the Minotaur’s hostile intentions, which are implied by the injuries to the horse and the matador.

There are a number of interpretations surrounding the young girl. Koppelman suggests that the way her feet are firmly planted toward the beast depicts her power to meet him, as she wants him to find the light. Gedo suggests that the Minotaur represents the artist himself and the girl represents the human ideal, holding the shining light of innocence and confident that the artist’s goodness will win out. She also suggests that the Minotaur, who is no longer blind as in previous depictions, represents the artist’s pride in having broken with Olga and reclaimed his own destiny and that the man climbing the ladder might represent aspects of his own timidity.

== Sources ==
- Martin Ries. "Picasso and the Myth of the Minautor". Art Journal, winter, 1972/1973, XXXII/2. Archived from the original on 2019-03-13.

== Books ==
- Françoise Gilot, Carlton Lake (1989). Life with Picasso. Anchor Books, Doubleday. ISBN 0385261861.
