= Helena Fourment with a Carriage =

1639 painting by Peter Paul Rubens

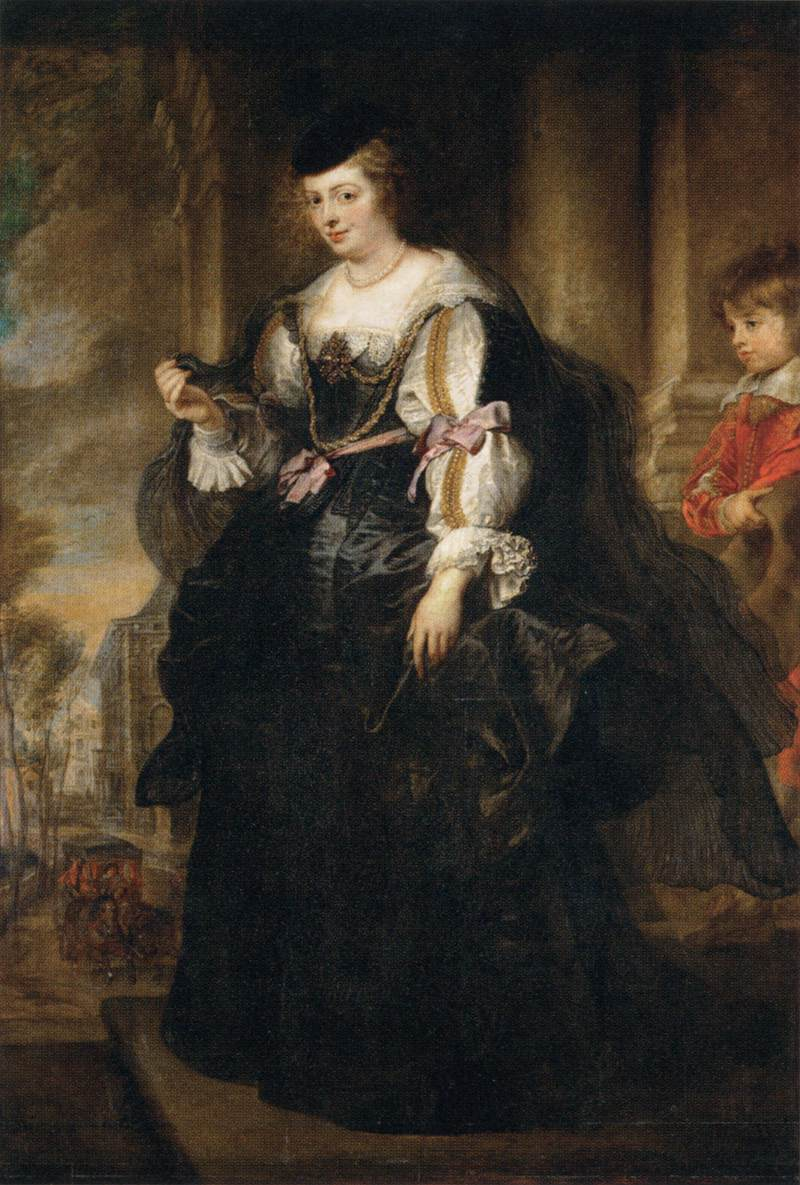
- Artist: Peter Paul Rubens
- Year: 1639
- Medium: oil paint, panel
- Dimensions: 195 cm (77 in) × 132 cm (52 in)
- Location: Room 855
- Accession: RF 1977 13

Helena Fourment with a carriage is a 1639 painting by Peter Paul Rubens, showing his second wife Helena Fourment, their son Frans and a carriage.

It was given to John Churchill, 1st Duke of Marlborough in 1706, possibly by the city of Brussels. Afterwards, it was located at Blenheim Palace along with other works by Rubens for the rest of the 18th century. It entered the Paris collection of Alphonse de Rotschild in 1884 and remained with his heirs until it was transferred to the French state in 1977 in lieu of inheritance tax. It is now in the Louvre Museum.
