= Two Girls Reading =

1934 painting by Pablo Picasso

- Deux enfants lisant (French)
- Artist: Pablo Picasso
- Year: 1934
- Medium: oil on canvas
- Movement: Cubism
- Dimensions: 91 cm × 70 cm (36 in × 27.5 in)
- Location: University of Michigan Museum of Art, Ann Arbor

Two Girls Reading (French: Deux enfants lisant) is a 1934 painting by Pablo Picasso. Since 1994, it has been at the University of Michigan Museum of Art.

In 2002, UMMA included it in an exhibition called Picasso: Masterworks of the Collection.

== Subject matter ==
The figure on the left is thought to be Marie-Thérèse Walter, the twenty-three-year-old woman who gave birth to Picasso's daughter Maïa in 1935. The figure on the right is thought to be either Walter's sister, or Picasso's first wife Olga Koklova.

The painting shows Picasso's "fascination with the subject of women engaged in everyday activities who are united in their ability to convey intensity and peaceful contemplation simultaneously."

== See also ==
- Pierre-Auguste Renoir, Two Girls Reading (Jeunes Filles Lisant), 1891
- Pierre-Auguste Renoir, The Two Sisters (Les Deux Soeurs), 1889
- Robert Reid (American painter), Two Girls Reading, No Date
- Henri Lebasque, Reading in the Park (Jeunes filles lisant dans le parc), No Date
- Jenny Montigny, Two Girls Reading (Deux Filles Lisant), No Date
- Ludvig Find, Two girls reading a book (To små piger læser i en bog), No Date
