= Château de Vie, Mougins =

Final residence of Pablo Picasso

Château de Vie/Mas Notre-Dame-de-Vie de Mougins
- "L'Antre du Minotaure"
- Mougins in France
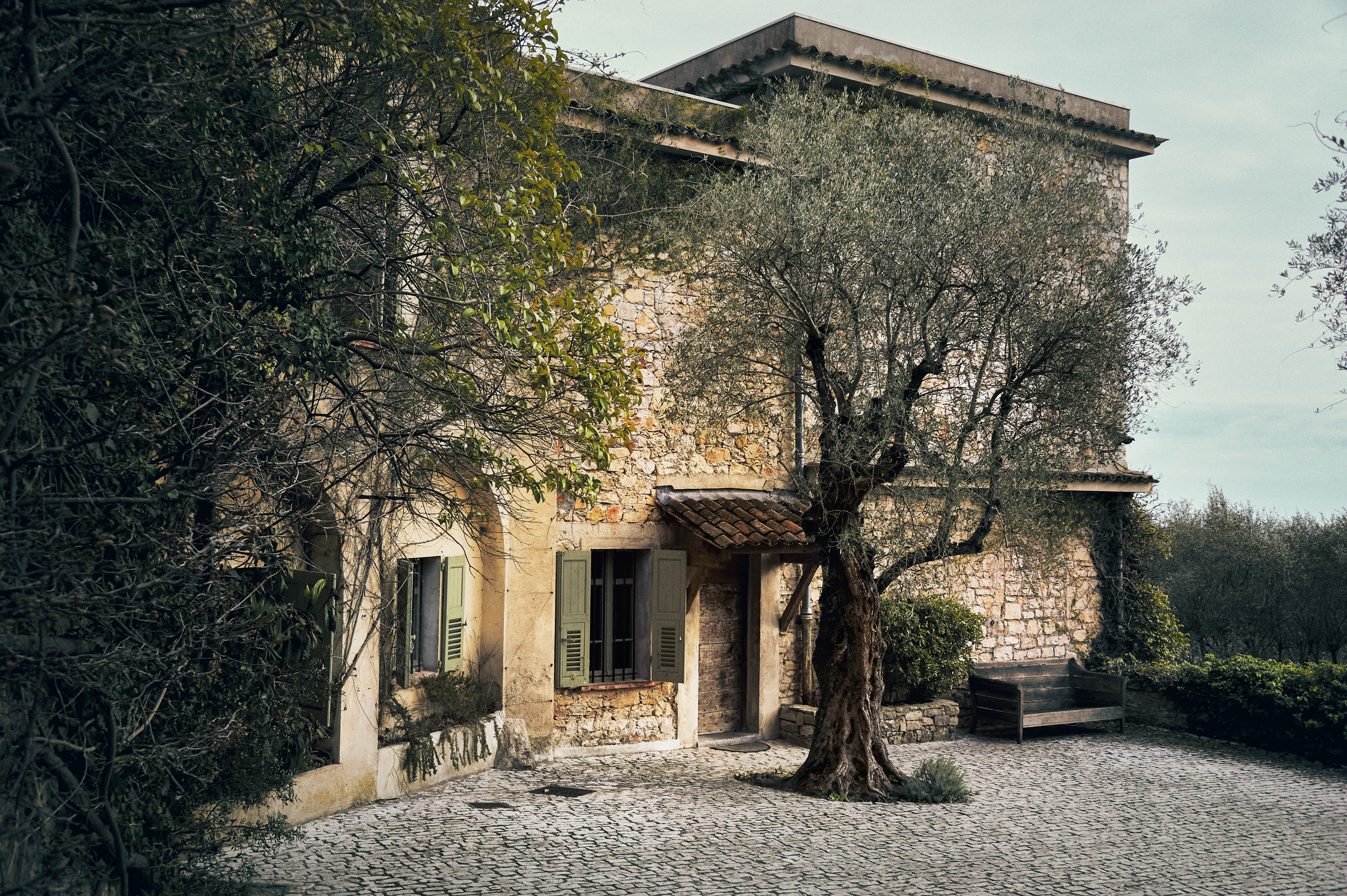

Location
- Coordinates: 43°35′42″N 7°00′18″E

Château de Vie in Mougins, France, was the final residence of Pablo Picasso. Pablo Picasso lived at Château de Vie (then known as Mas Notre Dame de Vie) until his death in 1973.

== Overview ==
Referred by Pablo Picasso as "the house of my dreams", the estate spreads over three hectares and has views of the Bay of Cannes, the Esterel mountains and the hills of Mougins.

Château de Vie has since been refurbished to become a private collection, while keeping as close as possible to the original house as it was during the days of Pablo Picasso.

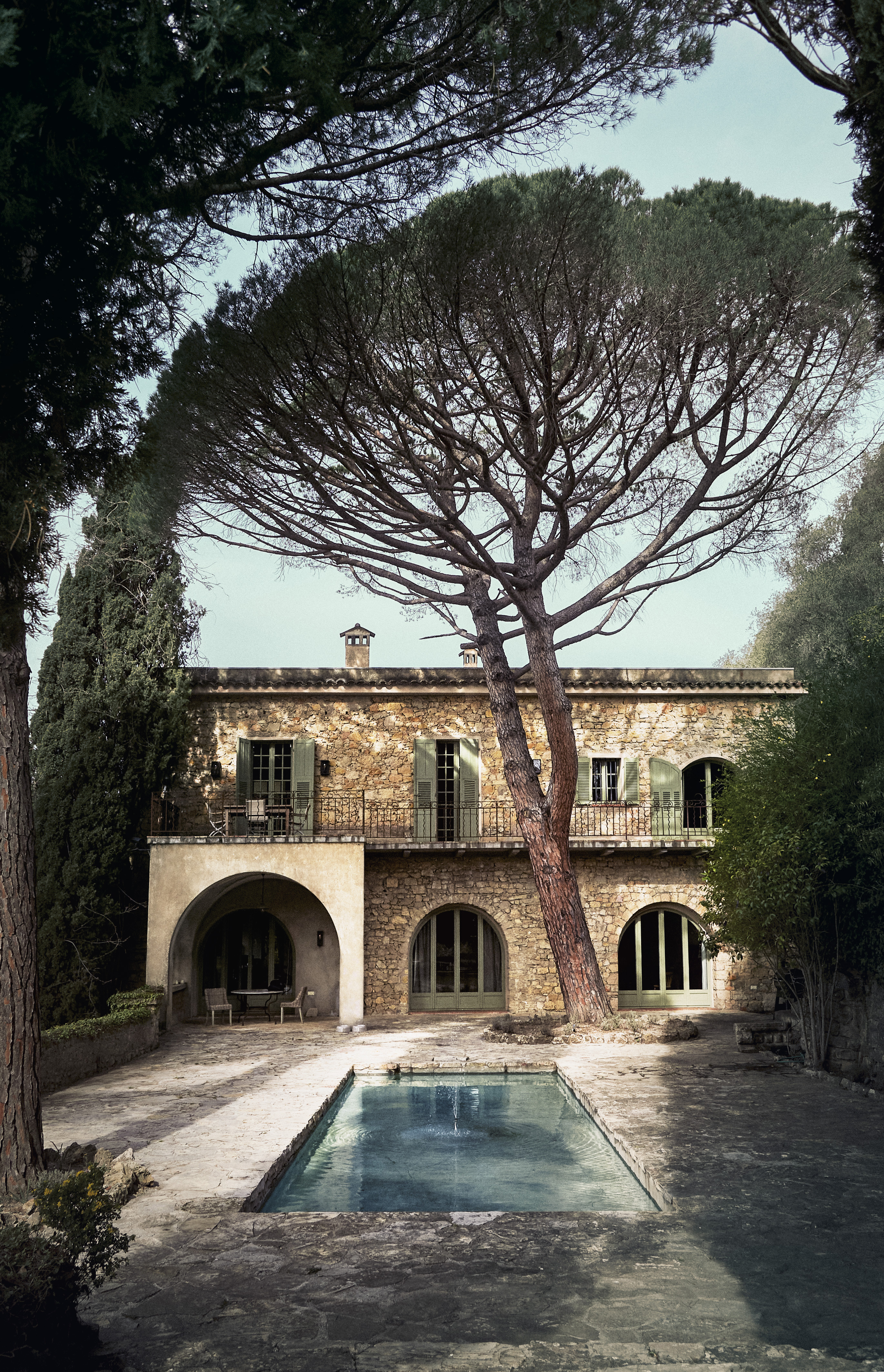
Château de Vie and Pool

The current form is designed by the architect and interior decorator Axel Vervoordt - maintaining its ancestry while providing a comfortable home despite its significant size. The estate is situated on the border of Cannes and Mougins, where it is 8 km from La Croisette in Cannes and 25 km from Nice international airport.

It is owned by a consortium of investors led by American lawyer, William S. Beslow.

== History ==
Chapel Notre Dame de Vie is the earliest part of the site. The sanctuary of Notre Dame de Vie is a remarkable architectural achievement and has been protected as a Monument historique (national heritage site) since 1927. The chapel has welcomed people such as Picasso, Mstislav Rostropovich, Rubinstein, Charlie Chaplin, Jean Cocteau, and Winston Churchill.

=== History of the chapel ===
==== 1259 ====
Two Gallo-Roman funerary inscriptions and a votive altar were found. In 1259, the name Notre Dame appeared in a bull of Pope Alexander IV, in which he confirmed all the possessions belonging to the Lerins Abbey and among them the castrum of Mougins with its three churches: Saint Jacques, Saint Mary, and Saint Martin.

==== 1519 ====
The chapel was designated under the name Notre Dame de Villevieille. Only minor events and alternations are recorded in the following years till 1656.

==== 1656 ====
The chapel was given its final name of Notre Dame de Vie. In 1654, the chapel was rebuilt and has undergone modifications since 1656 including minor restorations throughout the 20th century.

==== 1730 ====
Until 1730, the chapel was a sanctuaire à répit where families could bring their stillborn children to be baptised and thus, according to Catholic doctrine, enter heaven.

==== 1970 ====
Up until the 1970s, the town and chapel were home to a procession celebrating Saint Innocence, a virgin who was martyred in Rimini in 390 and was the patron saint of Mougins.

==== 2012 ====
The town of Mougins restored the site with funds raised from public subscription, grants from the Ministry of Culture and the Provence-Alpes-Côte d'Azur regional administration.

=== Estate in the 20th-century ===
In the early 20th century, the estate was owned by Benjamin and Bridget Guinness, who transformed a traditional farmhouse into a luxury villa.

The chapel garden houses a monumental tomb built for the Guinness family and is the burial site of Bridget Guinness. During their time at Château de Vie (the Mas Notre-Dame de Vie) they hosted many friends including Winston Churchill, who often painted in the gardens, and Pablo Picasso.

=== Picasso years ===
Pablo Picasso purchased Château de Vie (then Mas Notre-Dame de Vie) in 1961 from Thomas "Loel" Guinness, Benjamin and Bridget's son as a wedding gift for his soon to be wife, Jacqueline Roque.

The estate became Picasso's final home, and he lived in the house until his death in 1973. During his time at the estate, he produced some of his important works from his “later period,” with Jacqueline as his main muse. Jacqueline Picasso never recovered from the death of her husband. She had been frequenting Picasso's grave on the eighth of every month and said that he wanted her to join him. She shot herself, with Picasso’s gun, on 15 October 1986 in the Mougins estate.

Among some of the art works produced in the house are The Dance of Youth, 1961, Nu Assis dans un Fauteuil, 1963, the Chicago Picasso, 1967 and Femme Nue au Collier, 1968.

Picasso lived in almost total isolation in his last residence, working prolifically. He developed a routine, sleeping late in the morning and working late into the night, sometimes until the following morning. There he created hundreds of etchings within a very short time, as well as numerous paintings. His change in style was initially less well received by critics and the public than his earlier work. It was a long time before his later works, which were produced without exception in the rooms of Mas Notre-Dame de Vie, were fully appreciated.

In 2007 the then owner, property investor Tom Moeskops, renamed the house L’Antre du Minotaure (The lair of the Minotaur) in a reference to Picasso, who made the creature the subject of many of his artworks.
