= Nude in a Black Armchair =

1932 painting by Pablo Picasso

- Artist: Pablo Picasso
- Year: 1932
- Medium: oil on canvas
- Dimensions: 162 cm × 130 cm (63.74 in × 51 in)
- Location: Private collection

Nude in a Black Armchair (French: Nu au Fauteuil Noir) is an oil on canvas painting by Pablo Picasso. Painted on 9 March 1932, a time at which Picasso lived in Boisgeloup outside Paris, it is the first and largest of a series of paintings Picasso completed that year of his mistress Marie-Thérèse Walter. The painting was purchased by Les Wexner at Christie's auction in 1999 for the value of $45.1 million.

== Background ==
Picasso met Walter in 1927, while he was married to the Russian ballerina Olga Khokhlova. Their first meeting occurred outside the Galeries Lafayette in Paris, when Picasso stopped Walter in the street and asked to paint her portrait. Picasso was 45 years of age, but Walter, who was aged just 17, was impressed. In 2011, John Richardson, Picasso's biographer related this event. "She was at the Galeries Lafayette that day to buy a col Claudine—a Peter Pan collar—and matching cuffs. 'You have an interesting face,' Picasso told her. 'I would like to do a portrait of you. I am Picasso.' The name meant nothing to Marie-Thérèse, but the fact that an artist found her beautiful thrilled her." This was the beginning of a long-term affair that remained a secret until 1958.

== Description ==
This painting presents a nude female reclining on a black chair. In the background, the light of the sun can be seen shining through a window, which is partially obscured by a leafy indoor plant. The image is an expression of the artist's love for his model, which is evident in the use of fluid lines and the balance of colours. The painting is a portrait of Marie-Thérèse Walter, aged 22, who had been Picasso's mistress for the past five years.

The art critic Richard Lacayo noted the influence of Henri Matisse in this painting, commenting that Picasso "borrowed Matisse's voluptuous curves as a sign for pleasure and his use of black to intensify pink."

== Significance and legacy ==
Tate Modern exhibitions director Achim Borchardt-Hume emphasised that Picasso's relationships with his wife and his mistress had direct influence on his artwork. He said, "You can’t talk about Picasso without talking about his wife and his lover."

Picasso's 1932 portraits of Walter have been described as the "undisputed highlight" of Picasso's "year of wonders".

== Reception ==
Former Museum of Modern Art curator William Rubin deemed it a "squishy sexual toy," and other critics have described a theme of fecundity being mutually displayed by both the female figure and the plant.

== Auction ==
On 9 November 1999, the painting was bought by Les Wexner, founder of Limited Brands and patron of the Wexner Center for the Arts, in Columbus, Ohio, for $45.1 million at Christie's auction in New York.
