= Bust of a Woman (Marie-Thérèse) =

Sculpture by Pablo Picasso

- Bust of a Woman (Marie-Thérèse)
- Artist: Pablo Picasso
- Year: 1931
- Medium: Plaster
- Subject: Marie-Thérèse Walter
- Owner: Leon Black

Bust of a Woman (Marie-Thérèse) is a 1931 sculpture by the Spanish artist Pablo Picasso that depicts Marie-Thérèse Walter, who was Picasso's mistress at the time of its creation. In 2016 the ownership of the sculpture was the subject of a legal dispute between Qatar and the American art dealer Larry Gagosian, who had resold the bust to Leon Black.

== Design ==
The sculpture is a bust made from plaster. The nose of the sculpture is a representation of Picasso's penis that is draped over Walter's forehead. Picasso's biographer John Richardson felt that the breasts of the bust gave it "the look of a crouching Sphinx".

The piece was created at the same time as another plaster bust, Head of a Woman. Contemporaneous photographs of the two pieces in Picasso's studio at Boisgeloup show that he had originally attempted to fuse the two busts together and that they both had long "giraffe like" necks. Head of a Woman also references Picasso's genitalia, its eyeballs have been likened to testicles and its nose is also modeled on Picasso's penis.

== Analysis ==
Blake Gopnik discussed the sculpture in an article for Artnet. Gopnik was critical of Picasso's attitude towards Walter feeling that "Whatever identity Marie–Thérèse had before she met Pablo gets subsumed, at least in his mind and this sculpture, into her role as an extension and vehicle for his overweening masculinity". Gopnik paid particular focus on the mouth of the bust describing it as "...beautiful, delicate, sweet...priceless? It's as though Picasso needed to acknowledge the beauty of his mistress, and maybe also his real love for her, even as he brutalized her in art. Or it could be that he realized her lovely mouth was crucial to giving the rest of the piece its brutality." Gopnik concluded that "...rather than being a charming masterpiece, this $100 million bust is a work of tragic genius – and one that no one should want to live with...I hate Picasso's male-chauvinist vision of women, but I have to admire how brilliantly he builds it".

== History ==
The bust was displayed as part of the Picasso Sculpture exhibition at the Museum of Modern Art (MoMa) in New York in 2016. This was the largest exhibition of Picasso's sculptures for 50 years.

A legal dispute arose over the sculpture's sale and ownership between the art agency Pelham Europe, acting on behalf of the Qatari royal family, and the American art dealer Larry Gagosian, who had resold the bust to Leon Black. A trial was set for September 2016. In June 2016, the lawsuit was settled by Maya Widmaier Picasso, the owner of the sculpture. The settlement included Leon Black getting the sculpture and Widmaier Picasso paying Pelham an undisclosed amount.

The revelation of the disputed sale drew attention to the sculpture at the MoMa exhibition, a security guard was subsequently posted near it and Gopnik recalled that "Instagramers were all over it".
