= Maya with Doll =

Painting by Pablo Picasso

Maya with Doll (Maya à la poupée) is an oil painting by Pablo Picasso. Created in 1938, the New York Times described it as "a colorful Cubist portrait of Picasso’s daughter (Maya Widmaier-Picasso) as a child clutching a doll."

== 2007 theft and recovery ==
On February 28, 2007, the painting was one of two stolen from the home of Picasso's granddaughter Diana Widmaier-Picasso. The other was a 1961 painting of his second wife, titled Jacqueline.

On August 7, 2007, French officials announced that the painting had been recovered, along with the other stolen painting, Jacqueline. The paintings were found in Paris and the thieves, who were known to the police for previous cases of art theft, were arrested.
