= Portrait of Dora Maar =

Painting by Pablo Picasso

Portrait de Dora Maar
- Artist: Pablo Picasso
- Year: 1937
- Medium: Oil on canvas
- Dimensions: 92 cm × 65 cm (36 in × 26 in)
- Location: Musée Picasso, Paris

Portrait of Dora Maar (French: Portrait de Dora Maar) is a 1937 oil on canvas painting by Pablo Picasso. It depicts Dora Maar, (original name Henriette Theodora Markovitch), the painter's lover, seated on a chair. It is part of the collection of the Musée Picasso, in Paris, where it is considered to be one of Picasso's masterpieces.

== Background ==
The portrait of Dora Maar was painted by Pablo Picasso in 1937, one year after they first met in Paris and started a relationship that would last for almost nine years. The couple had briefly met on the set of the French movie The Crime of Monsieur Lange at the end of 1935. Later, in 1936, in the brasserie Les Deux Magots in the Saint-Germain-des-Prés neighbourhood of Paris, Dora Maar and Picasso, who were both artists and engaged in left-wing activities, were introduced by a mutual friend, Paul Eluard. Picasso, who was then 55 years old, fell in love with the 29-year-old Maar and the couple soon began living together. Their relationship was tempestuous and although it lasted for almost nine years, Picasso did not end his relationship with Marie-Thérèse Walter, who was the mother of his daughter Maya. The tension caused by this situation only worsened and their relationship ended in 1943.

== Description ==
Picasso's portrait of Dora Maar is an oil on canvas painting, which depicts the subject sitting in a chair. She is portrayed as an elegant woman, with fine jewellery and clothing. The portrait displays her long red fingernails, art deco jacket with a flower motif and her right ear as a bee. Her posture indicates that she is relaxed, as she sits with one hand raised against her cheek. This pose can also be seen in other portraits that Picasso created of Dora. The bars on the chair, which appear like prison cell bars, have been interpreted as symbols of the subject's confinement. Picasso once said, "A painter has to create what he feels. [...] Women are suffering machines. When I paint a woman in an armchair, the chair is old age and death, right? Too bad for her. Or it's to protect her..." Picasso painted Maar in the Surrealist style, using bright colours and angular shapes. Although her posture reflects a more traditional style of representation in art, her form is composed of short, sharp, broken lines. Musée Picasso Paris suggests that this is a symbol of the subject's perceived psychological imbalance. The image also displays a certain element of sadness in Maar's demeanour. Picasso often painted her as a tormented, anguished woman, which is most evident in his 1937 painting The Weeping Woman.

In this portrait, Maar's face is particularly remarkable for its experimental style, as the image combines both a profile and a frontal view of the face. Maar is looking directly towards the artist, which is impossible, but made possible by the artist's rendering of the subject. The other eye is looking inwards, towards herself. Picasso is therefore able to show two aspects of the face simultaneously, which convey two sides of the self.

This portrait of Maar is reminiscent of Helena Fourment with a Carriage, a painting by Peter Paul Reubens in 1639.

== Significance and legacy ==
Portrait of Dora Maar clearly shows the importance of the subject in Picasso's life. He painted numerous portraits of her during their relationship. Maar shared Picasso's life during the interwar period, a tumultuous time leading up to World War II. Connections have been drawn between the torment of the young woman as depicted in Picasso's portraits and the political upheavals of the period, particularly in Spain. The portrait therefore may be seen as a reflection of the anxiety caused by the Spanish Civil War, which broke out, a year before, in 1936.

== See also ==
- List of Picasso artworks 1931–1940
- Dora Maar au Chat
- The Weeping Woman
- 1937 in art
