= Le Tremblay-sur-Mauldre =

- Commune
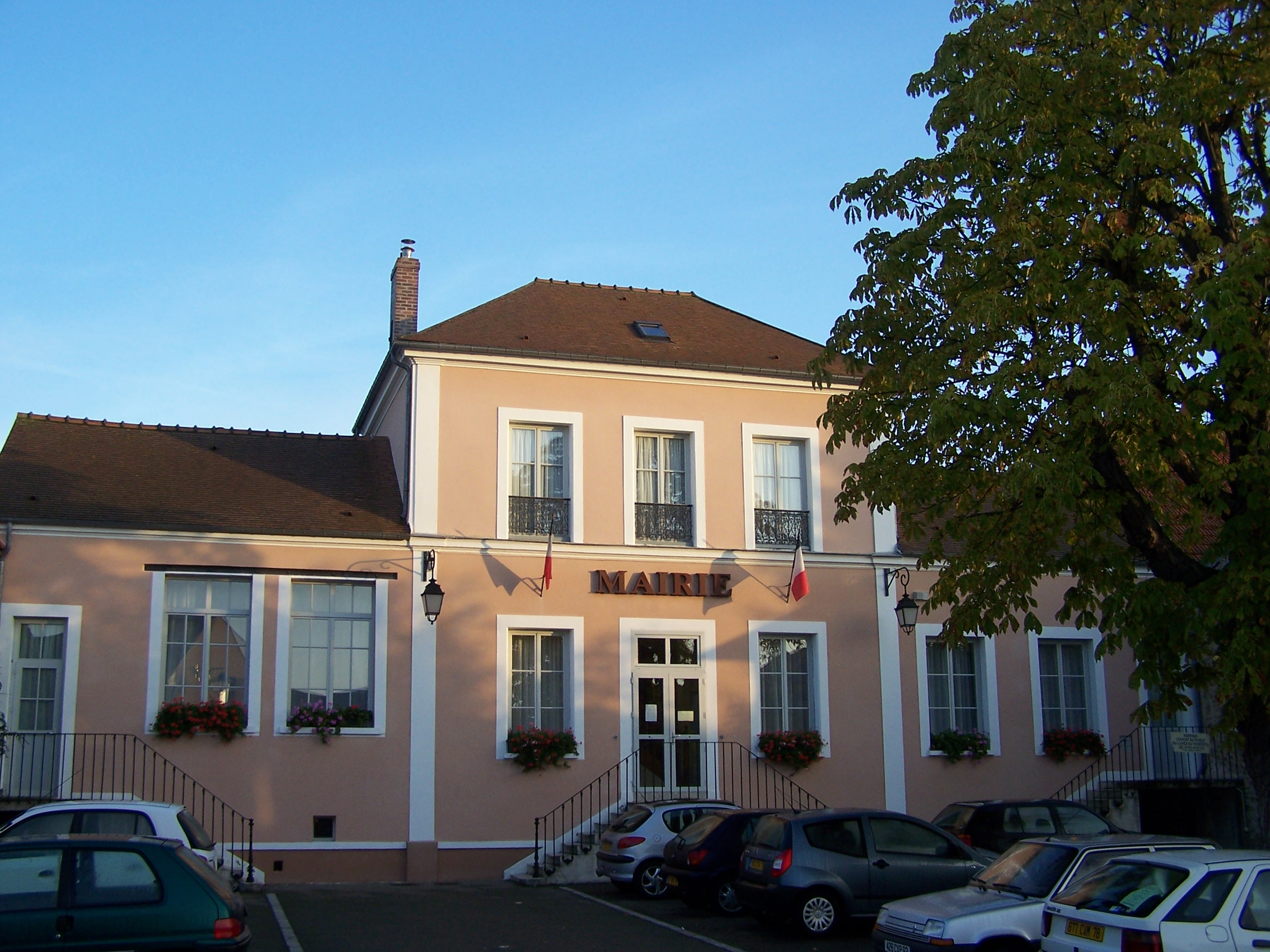
- Town hall
- Location of Le Tremblay-sur-Mauldre
- Location within France Location within Île-de-France (region)
- Coordinates: 48°46′42″N 1°52′45″E
- Country: France
- Region: Île-de-France
- Department: Yvelines
- Arrondissement: Rambouillet
- Canton: Aubergenville

Government
  - Mayor (2020–2026): Françoise Chancel
- Area^{1}: 6.23 km^{2} (2.41 sq mi)
- Elevation: 110 m (360 ft)
- Highest elevation: 175 m (574 ft)
- Lowest elevation: 67 m (220 ft)
- Population (2023): 930
  - Density: 150/km^{2} (390/sq mi)
- Time zone: UTC+01:00 (CET)
  - Summer (DST): UTC+02:00 (CEST)
- INSEE/Postal code: 78623 /78490
- ^{1} French Land Register data, which excludes lakes, ponds, glaciers > 1 km^{2} (0.386 sq mi or 247 acres) and river estuaries.

Le Tremblay-sur-Mauldre (French pronunciation: [lə tʁɑ̃blɛ syʁ moldʁ], literally Le Tremblay on Mauldre) is a commune in the Yvelines department in the Île-de-France in north-central France.

== See also ==
- Communes of the Yvelines department
