= Dora Maar au Chat =

1941 painting by Pablo Picasso

- Artist: Pablo Picasso
- Year: 1941
- Medium: Oil on canvas
- Dimensions: 128.3 cm × 95.3 cm (50.5 in × 37.5 in)
- Location: Private collection

Dora Maar au Chat (English: Dora Maar with Cat) is an oil-on-canvas painting by Pablo Picasso. It was painted in 1941 and depicts Dora Maar (original name Henriette Theodora Markovitch), the artist's lover, seated on a chair with a small cat perched on her shoulders. The painting is listed as one of the most expensive paintings, after achieving a price of $95 million at Sotheby's on 3 May 2006. It is currently the sixth-highest-selling painting by Picasso.

== Background ==
The canvas is one of many portraits of Dora Maar painted by Pablo Picasso over their nearly decade-long relationship. Their relationship began when Picasso met Maar on the set of Jean Renoir's film Le Crime de Monsieur Lange, where she was working as a movie photographer. They were formally introduced by the French Surrealist poet Paul Éluard. Picasso fell in love with the 29-year-old Maar at the age of 55 and the couple began living together. Picasso was drawn to Maar not only for her beauty but also for her intellect and artistic nature. Like Picasso, Maar was an artist, photographer, and poet. She shared Picasso's political views and also spoke Spanish. Their relationship was intensely passionate and tempestuous and she challenged Picasso both intellectually and artistically. Maar assisted Picasso with his artwork, particularly during his creation of Guernica, which she documented with photographs.

This painting was made in 1941, at the beginning of World War II. Picasso had already painted Maar many times before creating this painting. When the Nazis occupied France, the tension between Maar and Picasso increased, resulting in Picasso portraying Maar in a much more abstract way, sometimes depicting her in tears.

== Description ==
Dora Maar au Chat is one of the largest portraits of the subject by Picasso. It is an oil on canvas painting measuring 128.3 cm x 95.3 cm and is signed by the artist in the lower left corner. As Picasso's mistress and main model, Dora Maar was the artist's main source of inspiration and his artistic companion. The painting was created in 1941 during the midst of their tempestuous relationship.

The painting is a rare, three-quarter-length portrait of Maar, who is sitting in an armchair. Picasso used a vibrant palette to depict Maar's clothing and gave particular attention to details of the angles of the chair and the pattern on the dress. Maar's hat is particularly significant, as it signifies her involvement in the Surrealist movement. Like a crown on her head, the hat is ornate, embellished with colourful feathers and red trim. The presence of the subject is pronounced, reflecting the way a queen would sit on her throne.

In this painting, Picasso aims to depict not only Dora's beauty but also her temperament. He once described her as an "Afghan cat" in reference to her personality. The presence of the cat on her shoulder offers special significance, as it reflects the traditional pairing of cats and women in art that was used to suggest female cunning and sexual aggression. This theme is particularly noticeable in the way that the artist depicted Maar's long manicured fingernails, which in Picasso's portrait have been rendered as long talons.

Picasso depicted Maar's portrait in the Cubist style. He used faceted planes and blocks of colour to sculpt her body. The outlines of shapes in the body are accentuated in black, while Maar's face is sculpted in white. The composition is a construction of shapes with vertically inclined planes that contrast with the lines of the wooden floor in the background. Maar's face is presented from two angles, one half in profile with the eye looking straight at the viewer, and the other half of a full face. This possibly reflects Freud's writings about the double self-existing in every person.

David Norman, Chairman of Sotheby's Impressionist and Modern Art Department Worldwide, summarised the importance of the composition.

Dora Maar Au Chat presents the artist’s most mysterious and challenging mistress regally posed three-quarter length in a large wooden chair with a small black cat perched behind her in both an amusing and menacing attitude. The faceted planes of her body and richly layered surface of brushstrokes impart a monumental and sculptural quality to this dazzling portrait. The painting is also remarkable for its brilliance of color and the complex and dense patterning of the model’s dress. The powerful figure is set in a dramatic, yet simple setting composed of a vertiginously inclined plane of wooden floorboards and shallow interior space that is arranged in a manner reminiscent of Picasso’s earliest manipulations of space in a Cubist manner.

== Significance and legacy ==
Charles Moffett, Vice Chairman of Sotheby's, remarked on the painting's significance.

Dora Maar with Cat is unquestionably one of Picasso's most extraordinary portrayals of the woman who for nearly a decade was his muse, model, and lover. An accomplished photographer who was close to key members of the Surrealist circle, Maar appealed deeply to Picasso because of her arresting and wild beauty, engaging intellect, and commitment as an artist. As Brigitte Léal has observed with regard to the portraits of Dora Maar that Picasso painted in the early 1940s, ‘...they embody the height of modern beauty as [André] Breton envisioned it, based on the principle of vital disorder, which the figure of Dora Maar, in her extreme mutability, her real, spiritual restlessness, will forever incarnate’.

== Provenance ==
Pierre Colle of Paris acquired the painting in 1946. The painting was then obtained by Chicago collectors Leigh and Mary Block in 1947. They sold the painting in 1963. After that, the painting was never seen in public until the 21st century.

During 2005 and 2006, Dora Maar au Chat, then owned by the Gidwitz family of Chicago, was shown worldwide as part of Sotheby's exhibitions in London, Hong Kong, and New York. It came up for sale in an auction held at Sotheby's on 3 May 2006 in New York, making it the second-highest price ever paid for a painting at auction at the time. An anonymous Russian bidder who was present at the auction won the work with a final bid of $95,216,000, well exceeding the pre-auction estimate of $50 million. The identity of the bidder, who also purchased an 1883 Monet seascape and a 1978 Chagall, was a topic of much speculation. The winning buyer is listed as Georgian businessman and billionaire Bidzina Ivanishvili.

== See also ==
- List of most expensive paintings
- Portrait of Dora Maar
- Cubism
- Guernica
- Marie-Thérèse Walter
