= Marie-Thérèse Walter =

Lover of Pablo Picasso (1909–1977)

- Walter at Dinard, Brittany in 1928
- Born: 13 July 1909; Le Perreux, France
- Died: 20 October 1977 (aged 68); Juan-les-Pins, France
- Partner: Pablo Picasso (1927–1935)
- Children: Maya Widmaier-Picasso

Marie-Thérèse Walter (13 July 1909 – 20 October 1977) was a French model and lover of Pablo Picasso, with whom she had a daughter, Maya Widmaier-Picasso.

Walter is known as Picasso's "golden muse." She inspired numerous artworks and sculptures that he created of her during their relationship, which began when she was 17 years old and Picasso was 45 and married to his first wife, Olga Khokhlova. It ended after Picasso moved on to his next relationship with artist Dora Maar.

== Biography ==
Marie-Thérèse Walter was born on 13 July 1909 in Le Perreux, France. She was the child of a French woman and a Swedish businessman. Her parents did not marry.

=== Early years with Picasso ===
On 8 January 1927, Walter first met Picasso in front of the Galeries Lafayette in Paris. At the time, she was living with her mother and sisters at Maisons-Alfort, a suburb southeast of Paris. Picasso approached her and said, "You have an interesting face. I would like to do a portrait of you. I am Picasso". Walter was unfamiliar with his name but was flattered by the attention. The relationship began after Picasso invited Walter to visit his studio on 11 January 1927, which was situated on the floor above his apartment on Rue La Boétie. He studied her face and body and invited her to return the next day. The visits continued daily causing Walter to tell her mother that she had a job. She said, "He told me that I had saved his life, but I had no idea what he meant". A week after they first met, they were in a sexual relationship. At the time, Picasso was married to Olga Khokhlova, a Russian ballerina, with whom he had a five-year-old son. He and Walter, then seventeen years old, began a relationship which was kept secret from his wife until 1935. Walter reinvigorated Picasso's artwork. He began to draw her portrait repeatedly, inspired by her fresh, athletic appearance, curves, and oval face. Walter was very active and involved in rowing, gymnastics, and cycling. Walter commented, "My life with him was always secret, calm, and peaceful. We said nothing to anyone. We were happy like that, and we did not ask anything more".

In the summer of 1928, the Picasso family stayed at Dinard, where Picasso also installed Walter at a summer camp for girls and arranged to see her in secret at his rented beach cabana. In July 1930, he bought a château at Boisgeloup close to Gisors, which he used as a studio for sculpture. His wife frequented the estate on weekends before returning to Paris, while his mistress spent the week with him. Walter was the unseen shadow of the family and became his model and muse for both paintings and sculptures.

In September 1932, Walter nearly drowned after falling out of her kayak on the river Marne. This event caused her to contract a viral infection that resulted in hospitalisation and the loss of her hair. In response, Picasso painted Rescue on 20 November, an image of a woman being saved from drowning.

In October 1932, Picasso's first major retrospective took place at the Galeries Georges Petit, which displayed numerous artworks depicting nude portraits of Walter, revealing the nature of his relationship with her. These portraits included The Dream and Nude, Green Leaves and Bust.

=== Final years with Picasso ===
In 1934, Walter became pregnant. She informed Picasso on Christmas Eve 1934. Khokhlova had already left the family apartment on Rue La Boétie that year, but rather than moving in with Walter, Picasso rented a neighbouring house for her. When Khokhlova was informed by a friend that her husband had a longtime relationship with a woman who was expecting a child, she immediately left Picasso and moved to the South of France with their son, Paulo. Picasso and Khokhlova never divorced, and although Picasso was intent on it and explored the legal possibilities, Khokhlova was "bitterly opposed to the whole thing". Instead, she impounded his work until he came to terms eventually paying her a large allowance. They lived separately until her death in 1955.

On 5 September 1935, Picasso and Walter's daughter, María de la Concepción, called "Maya", was born in Boulogne-Billancourt. Walter and Maya stayed with Picasso at Juan-les-Pins in the South of France from 25 March to 14 May 1936, and then moved to Le Tremblay-sur-Mauldre, 25 kilometres (16 mi) from Versailles, in autumn 1937. Picasso visited on the weekends and some weekdays to play with his daughter. Maya also modeled for some of his paintings, including Maya with Doll (1938).

By the time of Maya's birth, Picasso had already been seeing several other women including Alice Paalen and Valentine Hugo. Several months after the birth of Maya, he began a relationship with Dora Maar, a surrealist photographer and model for Picasso, in 1936. He maintained relationships with both women and combined their portraits in the 1937 artwork Girl with a Red Beret and Pompom. Picasso installed Walter, her sister and mother at Villa Gerbier de Jonc in Royan, where he spent time with her on weekends away from Maar.

Once, Walter and Maar met accidentally in Picasso's studio when he was painting Guernica. Asked about this in later life, Picasso allegedly remarked that he had been quite happy with the situation and that when they demanded that he choose between them, he told them that they would have to fight it out themselves, at which point the two women began to wrestle. The art historian and friend of Picasso, John Richardson, said this story was not true and both Maar and Picasso told him it never happened. He said it is more likely that the event is imagined from the pictorial representation of Walter and Maar who appear as if in battle at opposite ends of the composition of Guernica. His daughter Maya later recalled unexpectedly encountering Maar on a visit to the studio with her mother: “One day we turned up and she was there, standing next to Guernica. I started crying and said to my father, ‘I don’t want to see the dribbly lady.’ I was talking about Dora Maar, who licked her lips a lot. I never saw her again.”

On 4 December 1937, Picasso painted Femme au béret et à la robe quadrillée (Marie-Thérèse Walter), which depicts the fused portraits of Walter and Maar using the angular lines of Cubism and expresses his shifting affection from Walter to his new love, Maar. Walter's relationship with Picasso ended in 1940.

=== Later years and death ===
In September 1939, when World War II was declared, Walter and Maya were in Royan and stayed there until the spring of 1941. They then moved back to Paris to live in an apartment on Île Saint-Louis. Walter was now aware of Picasso's relationship with Maar. Françoise Gilot later said that Maya lived with "the fiction that her father worked a long way away".

Picasso continued to visit Walter and Maya on Thursdays and Sundays for the next ten years. After the end of World War II, he moved to the South of France with Françoise Gilot. Walter only saw him on occasion but continued to write letters to him for a while. In 1955, when Khokhlova died, Picasso called Walter by phone and asked her to marry him, but she refused. Picasso did not see her again and Walter moved to the South of France. Upon the death of Picasso in 1973, Picasso's grandson Pablito was prevented from attending his funeral and consequently swallowed a bottle of bleach. Walter contacted the Minister of Health to arrange for a helicopter to transport him to the American Hospital in Paris. His brother-in-law, who was an art dealer, took the call and Walter sold him two of Picasso's paintings to pay for his medical bills. However, Pablito died a few months later.

On 20 October 1977, Walter died by suicide after hanging herself at her villa in Juan-les-Pins, South of France.

== Legacy ==
Walter has been described by art critics as Picasso's "golden muse". Picasso created numerous portraits of her, combining elements of Classicism and Surrealism. The sensuality of these portraits reflects the intensity of their love affair. The surrealist photographer, Brassaï stated, "He loved the blondeness of her hair, her luminous complexion, her sculptural body. At no other moment in his life did his paintings become so undulant, all sinuous curves, arms enveloping, hair in curls…"

Walter was the model for at least three of the figures depicted in Picasso's 1937 painting Guernica, which was his response to the Luftwaffe bombing of the Basque town. According to Diana Widmaier Picasso, Walter was, "forever an emblem of hope and peace for Picasso".

Woman with Vase, a bronze copy of a plaster sculpture of a fertility goddess that Picasso based on Walter in 1933 was placed on the artist's tomb at the Château de Vauvenargues.

== Incomplete list of portraits ==
- 5.10.30. (1930)
- The Red Armchair (1931)
- Bust of a Woman (Marie-Thérèse) (1931)
- Woman with Yellow Hair (1931)
- Femme endormie (1931)
- La Lecture (1932)
- Le Repos (1932)
- Girl before a Mirror (1932)
- The Dream (1932)
- Femme assise près d'une fenêtre (Woman sitting by a window) (1932)
- Nude, Green Leaves and Bust (1932)
- Nude in a Black Armchair (1932)
- Nude Woman Reclining (Femme nue couchée) (1932)
- Two Girls Reading (1934)
- Portrait of Marie-Thérèse Walter with Garland (1937)
- Seated Woman, Portrait of Marie-Thérèse Walter (1937)
- Girl with a Red Beret and Pompom (1937)
- Woman in Hat and Fur Collar (1937)
- Femme au béret et à la robe quadrillée (Marie-Thérèse Walter) (1937)
- Marie-Thérèse Leaning on One Elbow (1939)
- Walter is extensively portrayed in Picasso's Vollard Suite.

== In literature and the arts ==
Walter is played by Susannah Harker in the 1996 film Surviving Picasso. She is played by Poppy Delevingne in the 2018 television series Genius, which focuses on the life and art of Pablo Picasso.

== Bibliography ==
- Picasso, Olivier Widmaier. PICASSO: The Real Family Story. Prestel Publ. 2004. 320 p. ISBN 3-7913-3149-3 (biography)
