= Château de Boisgeloup =

18th-century château in Normandy, France

Coordinates: 49.255304°N 1.780311°E

Château de Boisgeloup is an 18th-century château near Gisors in Eure, Normandy, formerly owned by Pablo Picasso and now a private art gallery run by his grandson Bernard Ruiz-Picasso and gallerist Almine Rech.

Picasso bought Château de Boisgeloup with his wife Olga Khokhlova in June 1930. There he developed his art into a more abstract style and experimented in sculpture. He also produced there many of the prints from the Vollard Suite (1930–1937).

Picasso left Boisgeloup before World War II after his break-up with Olga Khokhlova in 1937. She took over the château and it was inherited by their son Paulo Picasso in 1973 and then by Bernard Ruiz-Picasso in 1975.

In 2002 Bernard Ruiz-Picasso and his wife Almine Rech founded the Fundación Almine y Bernard Ruiz-Picasso para el Arte (FABA) to steer Picasso's legacy and in 2012 opened the château and Picasso's studio to the public, starting the first of a series of contemporary art exhibitions with Un Soir à Boisgeloup.
