= Nude, Green Leaves and Bust =

1932 painting by Pablo Picasso

- Nu au Plateau de Sculpteur (French)
- Artist: Pablo Picasso
- Year: 1932
- Medium: Oil on canvas
- Dimensions: 162 cm × 130 cm (64 in × 51 in)
- Location: Private collection (Currently on long-term loan to Tate Modern)

Nude, Green Leaves and Bust (French: Nu au Plateau de Sculpteur) is a 1932 oil on canvas painting by Pablo Picasso, featuring his mistress Marie-Thérèse Walter.

The painting was in the personal collection of Los Angeles art collectors Sidney and Frances Brody for nearly six decades. It sold at auction for US$106.5 million, the third highest price for a piece of artwork sold at auction at the time.

== Background ==
Nude, Green Leaves and Bust is one of a series of portraits that Picasso painted of his mistress and muse Marie-Thérèse Walter from 1932. The vibrant blue and lilac canvas is more than 5 feet (1.5 m) tall.

At the time, Picasso was in an exclusive contractual relationship with noted impressionist and post-impressionist French-Jewish art dealer Paul Rosenberg, who bought the painting direct from his friend. With the increasing tones of an approaching war, in the late 1930s Rosenberg started to distribute works from his 2,000+ piece collection around the world, and used the 1939 New York World's Fair as the excuse to ship the painting outside France. After the 1940 Nazi invasion of France, on reaching New York via Lisbon in September 1940, Rosenberg opened a new branch of his noted gallery on East 57th street and put the painting back on display.

From there it was bought by the Brodys in 1951, and was publicly exhibited only once in 1961, to commemorate Picasso's 80th birthday.

== Auction ==
Frances Brody died in November 2009. On May 4, 2010, the painting was sold at Christie's in New York City, which won the rights to auction the collection against London-based Sotheby's. The collection as a whole was valued at over $150 million, while the work was originally expected to earn $80 million at auction.

Eight bidders were at the auction house, while the winning bid was taken via telephone for $95 million. Including the buyer's premium, the price reached $106.5 million. When inflation is ignored, the painting broke the record price for an artwork sold at auction until it was surpassed by the selling of The Scream on May 2, 2012, for $120 million.

== See also ==
- List of most expensive paintings
