= The Weeping Woman =

Painting by Pablo Picasso

- Artist: Pablo Picasso
- Year: 1937
- Medium: Oil on canvas
- Movement: Cubism
- Dimensions: 61 cm × 50 cm (23 15/60 in × 19 11/16 in)
- Location: Tate Modern collection, London

The Weeping Woman (French: La Femme qui pleure) is a series of oil on canvas paintings by Pablo Picasso, the last of which was created in late 1937. The paintings depict Dora Maar, Picasso's mistress and muse. The Weeping Woman paintings were produced by Picasso in response to the bombing of Guernica in the Spanish Civil War and are closely associated with the iconography in his painting Guernica.

Picasso was intrigued with the subject of the weeping woman, and revisited the theme numerous times that year. The most elaborate version, created on 26 October 1937, is in the Tate collection. Another Weeping Woman painting created on 18 October 1937 is housed at the National Gallery of Victoria and was involved in a high-profile political art theft.

== Background ==
Picasso created Weeping Woman during the Spanish Civil War, which broke out in July 1936, when General Franco revolted against the Republican government. It was part of a series of works in response to the bombing of Guernica in the Spanish Civil War on 26 April 1937. The bombing took place when Adolf Hitler ordered the German airforce to bomb the Basque town on behalf of Franco. The painting was a personal protest after seeing newspaper photographs of the event.

In January 1937, Picasso had been asked to produce a mural for the Spanish Pavilion at the Paris International Exhibition. While he was working on the commission, the bombing of Guernica occurred. Picasso was so shocked by the massacre that he stated in the Springfield Republican on 18 July 1937, "In the panel on which I am working, which I shall call Guernica, and in all my recent works of art, I clearly express my abhorrence of the military caste which has sunk Spain in an ocean of pain and death". The Weeping Woman series has been described as a postscript to Guernica.

Picasso's protest against the Franco regime began with his creation of two etchings in January 1937, titled The Dream and Lie of Franco. The work was accompanied by a prose poem, written by Picasso on 8 and 9 January 1937, which features imagery of women weeping and was a precursor to his visual representation of the weeping woman as a symbol for the suffering of Spain under Franco.

...cries of children cries of women cries of birds cries of flowers cries of timbers and of stones cries of bricks cries of furniture of beds and chairs of curtains of pots of cats and of papers cries of odors which claw at one another cries of smoke pricking the shoulder of the cries which strew in the cauldron and of the rain of birds which inundates the sea which gnaws the bone and breaks its teeth biting the cotton wool which the sun mops up from the plate which the purse and the pocket hide in the print which the foot leaves in the rock.

=== Development ===
During the creation of Guernica, Picasso made his first studies of a weeping woman on 24 May 1937, however, it was not to be included in the composition of Guernica. An image of the weeping woman was inserted in the lower right of the painting, but this was removed by Picasso, who considered that it would upstage the agonised expressions of the four women in the painting. Picasso's aim in producing Guernica was to portray the immediate shock and horror of the destruction, rather than the tears of mourning that would arise in the aftermath.

Following the completion of Guernica, Picasso continued with his obsession for the weeping woman. Judi Freeman remarked that, "The one motif he could not relinquish was that of the weeping woman. Her visage haunted him. He drew her frequently, almost obsessively, for the next several months. She was the metaphor for his private agonies". Between 8 June and 6 July 1937, Picasso produced a dozen drawings and four oil paintings depicting the weeping woman. After returning from a summer holiday in Mougins, he completed the last The Weeping Woman painting on 26 October 1937. In total, 36 works depicting the weeping woman have been identified, executed between May and the end of October 1937.

=== Relationship with Dora Maar ===
Picasso met Dora Maar in the winter of 1935. The poet Paul Éluard introduced Picasso to Maar while she was working as a photographer on Jean Renoir's film Le Crime de Monsieur Lange. Although he was 26 years older than Maar, they were drawn together by a shared connection of art and politics. Maar pursued a career as a photographer and became involved in the Surrealist movement. She was Picasso's mistress until their breakup in 1945. It was Maar who documented Picasso's painting of Guernica by taking photographs of its development. Dora Maar was politically aware, articulate and persuasive, and may have had influence on Picasso's own political views. She was responsible for arranging the use of the studio on 7 rue des Grands Augustins, where Picasso created Guernica and also contributed to its development. Picasso first drew her portrait on 11 September 1936. She became his main model between the autumn of 1936 and spring of 1937. Picasso portrayed her as a tranquil figure until his creation of the weeping women paintings, which displayed a noticeable change in his approach to her.

Picasso physically abused Maar, which eventually contributed to her breakdown. Picasso portrayed Maar in numerous portraits during their time together, often depicting her in tears, a motif that would lead to her being primarily known as his "weeping woman", rather than as an artist in her own right. Maar disliked the portraits that Picasso created of her, stating, "All (Picasso's) portraits of me are lies. They're Picassos. Not one is Dora Maar".

Dora has been described as "Picasso's emblematic victim". Françoise Gilot related that Picasso had said, "For me she's the weeping woman. For years I've painted her in tortured forms, not through sadism, and not with pleasure, either; just obeying a vision that forced itself on me". John Richardson offered a more realistic interpretation of Dora's tears. "The source of Dora's tears was not Franco, but the artist's traumatic manipulation of her. Picasso's obsession with her had intensified [at that time], but to judge by the artist's portrayals of her, it precluded tenderness." Françoise Gilot described Maar as, "by nature nervous, anxious and tormented", who suffered from emotional vulnerability and frequent upsets in this period. Picasso explained that, "Dora m'a toujours fait peur" and portrayed her in this manner on numerous occasions from 1938. Maar later admitted that Picasso probably drew his inspiration from her sadness.

== Versions ==
There are different versions of The Weeping Woman, all painted between June and October, 1937, as well as a range of drawings on the subject. The most famous painting is held in the Tate Gallery in London. Another version created on 18 October, said by some to be the next best, is held by the National Gallery of Victoria. One version entitled Weeping Woman with Handkerchief created on 26 June is held at the LA County Museum of Art and another created on 18 October is held at Musee Picasso.

== Tate-held version ==
The final version of Picasso's 1937 The Weeping Woman is an abstract portrait of a grief-stricken woman. It is an oil painting on canvas measuring 61 x 50 cm and is signed 'Picasso 37' near the centre on the right edge. It is one of a series of artworks based on the theme of a woman weeping, which Picasso created while producing Guernica. The composition of this painting is highly stylised. Picasso used bright colours and bold lines to convey the figure in a complex series of angular shapes and planes. Despite its abstract nature, the model for this portrait can be identified as Dora Maar, Picasso's lover.

Roland Penrose commented on the use of colour in the painting in his biography of Picasso: "The result of using colour in a manner so totally unassociated with grief, for a face in which sorrow is evident in every line, is highly disconcerting. As though the tragedy had arrived without warning."

The face of the weeping woman can be traced directly to the tortured figures depicted in Guernica. In particular, the weeping woman continues the theme of mourning that can be seen in the image of the screaming woman holding a dead baby in Guernica. Picasso created various versions of the woman's face throughout his series of paintings, with the woman depicted in endless tears and sometimes twisted beyond recognition.

The Weeping Woman has been described as the most complex, most fragmented and most highly coloured of all the weeping women artworks. In addition to the confused mass of hands, mouth, teeth, handkerchief and tears in the centre of the painting, Picasso also depicted the eyes with great analytical attention. The Tate draws particular attention to the childlike but striking rendition of the eyes, which have been depicted as overflowing saucers and have been placed on the peaks of the handkerchief to provide an intense exploration of physical and emotional distress. This element was expressed in earlier works that Picasso produced in the same year, which was most intense between 12 and 18 October 1937. The earlier paintings also featured the symbol of the handkerchief within the composition.

The architecture of the weeping woman's face is very distinctive and shares many design elements with the four female figures depicted in Guernica. The face is portrayed from mixed viewpoints, with the nose in profile, the mouth shown in three-quarters view and the eyes viewed from the front. This treatment of the face is echoed in the faces of the Guernica women. However, The Weeping Woman is distinct from these figures in the way that Picasso used cubist forms of fragmentation to depict the face in a series of angular planes, rather than the flat, curvilinear images in Guernica.

=== Symbolism and interpretations ===
The image of Picasso's weeping woman has been interpreted in a variety of ways. The symbolism of women suffering has been directly associated with the suffering of Spain that prevails in the iconography of Guernica. For Picasso, the image of the woman with the dead child represented the reality of the civil war, which had been covered in the French media with images of mothers and children in distress. In addition, the French Popular Front had used such photographs to protest against the conflict in 1936.

A further interpretation of the painting is that the woman illustrates the Christian motif of the Virgin Mary mourning her dead son, Jesus Christ. This was a particularly prominent theme in Baroque Spanish religious art. Although Picasso was an atheist, John Richardson considered that his art made references to religious themes. Marilyn McCully opined that the weeping woman works are related to the Mater Dolorosa, Our Lady of Sorrows stating, "In their essence as images of art, their emotional power lies in their origins among the painted wood, life-sized statues of the Madonna carried in Spain in religious processions, whose tears are jewels that sparkle as they run down their cheeks, and whose garments are real lace, velvets and silver - at once real and other worldly".

Christie's describes the weeping woman as a more generic victim and witness to the destruction.

She is moreover a universal figure not attached to any single event nor even to her cataclysmic century as a whole - she is the timelessly universal messenger of unfathomable and inconsolable human sorrow, the bearer of an elemental emotion that is as miraculously and beautifully human to contemplate as it is disturbing to behold.

Jonathan Jones for The Guardian noted that the painting demonstrates both hope and fury. Picasso's biographer, Roland Penrose, who was the previous owner, considered it to be an illustration of optimism, perhaps depicting the healing power of mourning. In evidence of this, Jones pointed to elements of the painting, such as the flower in the woman's hat, the river of her flowing hair and the transformation of her right ear into a bird sipping her tear, a possible representation of new life.

=== Provenance ===
Picasso sold the painting to Roland Penrose on 9 or 10 November 1937. Penrose then gave the painting to Antony Penrose in 1963. The artwork was stolen in 1969 but recovered. It was then placed on long-term loan at the Tate. It was subsequently accepted by the Commissioners of Inland Revenue in lieu of tax in 1987. It is now part of Tate Liverpool's permanent collection.

=== Theft ===
On 7 April 1969, The Weeping Woman, alongside 25 other paintings, was stolen from the Penrose home at Hornton Street, London. The theft received a great deal of publicity and was discussed by Roland Penrose on BBC's 24 Hours programme on 8 April 1969. Penrose was quoted in the Daily Mirror stating, "My most prized picture was a Picasso called "A Woman Weeping" which I bought just after he painted it. It must be worth between £60,000 and £80,000. It was my most treasured possession. I bought it when the paint was still wet."

He informed Picasso of the theft on 9 April by writing, describing the theft as an "appalling disaster". The paintings were eventually recovered by labourers at a house that was due to be demolished in Ealing, west London, in July. When Penrose was reunited with the paintings at Chelsea Police Station he almost wept. The theft caused the family to rethink their security arrangements and this led to the painting being offered on loan to the Tate.

=== Significance and legacy ===
The Weeping Woman has been described as "an iconic work within the history of British Surrealism". It was displayed at the Whitechapel Gallery in a major exhibition of Surrealist artworks in 1937. Later, in 1939, it was displayed alongside Guernica in London and Brighton. It was included in the 1960 exhibition of Picasso's work at the Tate that has been described as the first blockbuster exhibition in the world. Frances Morris, Head of Collections at Tate Modern has described it as "a highlight of Surrealism" and "an amazing depiction of female grief and a metaphor for the tragedy of Spain. It was painted during the Spanish Civil War as one of a series made in response to the tragedy of Guernica. It powerfully captures an immense moment of sadness."

== National Gallery of Victoria version ==
Another version of the Weeping Woman, created on 18 October 1937, is held by the National Gallery of Victoria (NGV). It measures 55.2 × 46.2 cm and was purchased by the gallery in 1986 for A$1.6 million, the most expensive painting purchased by any gallery in Australia, the previous record held by Blue Poles, which cost the Australian National Gallery A$1.3 million in 1974.

The purchase was controversial because of its very high price tag, with some local artists complaining that the money could have been spent on Australian art. The small size of the painting added to the controversy, seemingly highlighting the large expenditure. At the time, the painting was compared to "Blue Poles", but that was a large painting, so it highlighted the high cost of The Weeping Woman, which was a relatively small piece. In 2016, the NGV version of the Weeping Woman was valued by Sotheby's at $100 million.

=== Theft ===
This version was the subject of a high-profile art heist in August 1986, being stolen from the NGV specifically to make a political statement about the funding of art purchases in Australia. The theft made Australian and international news. The thieves left a note listing their demands, which included an increase in the funding of the arts. There was an extensive police hunt, which failed to find the painting. Later the same month, it was retrieved from a railway station locker in Melbourne. The thieves were never discovered, though various theories have persisted over the years about who it might have been, and as to whether it was an inside job.

== Third version ==
A third version of the painting is held in the Musée Picasso in Paris.

== See also ==
- Portrait of Dora Maar
- Dora Maar au Chat
- List of Picasso artworks 1931–1940
