= Le Rêve (Picasso) =

1932 oil painting by Pablo Picasso

- The Dream (English)
- Artist: Pablo Picasso
- Year: 1932
- Medium: Oil on canvas
- Movement: Cubism
- Dimensions: 130 cm × 97 cm (51 in × 38 in)
- Location: Private collection of Steve Cohen

Le Rêve (English: The Dream) is a 1932 oil on canvas painting (130 × 97 cm) by Pablo Picasso, then 50 years old, portraying his 22-year-old mistress Marie-Thérèse Walter. It is said to have been painted in one afternoon, on 24 January 1932. It belongs to Picasso's period of distorted depictions, with its oversimplified outlines and contrasted colors resembling early cubism. The erotic content of the painting has been noted repeatedly, with critics pointing out that Picasso painted an erect penis, presumably symbolizing his own, in the upturned face of his model. On 26 March 2013, the painting was sold in a private sale for $155 million, making it one of the most expensive paintings ever sold.

== Provenance ==
Le Rêve was purchased for $7,000 in 1941 by Victor and Sally Ganz of New York City. This purchase began their 50-year collection of works by just five artists: Picasso, Jasper Johns, Robert Rauschenberg, Frank Stella, and Eva Hesse. After the Ganzes died (Victor in 1987 and Sally in 1997), their collection, including Le Rêve, was sold at Christie's auction house on November 11, 1997, as a means of settling their inheritance tax bill. Le Rêve sold for an unexpectedly high $48.4 million, at the time the fourth most expensive painting sold (tenth when taking inflation into account). The entire collection set a record for the sale of a private collection, bringing $206.5 million. The total amount paid by the Ganzes over their lifetime of collecting these pieces was around $2 million.

The buyer who purchased Le Rêve at Christie's in 1997 appears to have been the Austrian-born investment fund manager Wolfgang Flöttl, who also briefly held Van Gogh's Portrait of Dr. Gachet in possession in the late 1990s. In 2001, under financial pressure, he sold Le Rêve to casino magnate Steve Wynn for an undisclosed sum, estimated to be about $60 million.

== Wynn incident ==
In 2006, the painting was the centerpiece of Wynn's collection and he had considered naming his Wynn Las Vegas resort after it. During a period of anti-French sentiment in the United States in response to France's opposition to the United States' proposed invasion of Iraq, Wynn decided it was inadvisable to give the resort a French name. In October 2006, Wynn told a group of his friends (including screenwriter Nora Ephron and her husband Nick Pileggi, broadcaster Barbara Walters, art dealer Serge Sorokko and his wife, model Tatiana Sorokko and lawyer David Boies and his wife, Mary) that he had agreed the day before to sell Le Rêve for $139 million to Steve Cohen. At the time, this price would have made Le Rêve the most expensive piece of art ever. While Wynn was showing the painting to his friends, apparently about to reveal the now still officially undisclosed previous owner (see above), he put his right elbow through the canvas, puncturing the left forearm of the figure and creating a six-inch tear. Ephron offered as an explanation that Wynn uses wild gestures while speaking and has retinitis pigmentosa, which affects his peripheral vision. Later, Wynn said that he took the event as a sign to not sell the painting.

After a $90,000 repair, the painting was re-valued at $85 million. Wynn filed a claim to recover the $54 million perceived loss from his Lloyd's of London insurers, an amount which would have covered most of the initial cost of buying the painting. When the insurers balked, Wynn sued them in January 2007. The case was eventually settled out of court in March 2007. Cohen bought the painting from Wynn in 2013 for $155 million (ca. $134 million in 2006 dollars). Ignoring inflation, the price was estimated to be the highest ever paid for an artwork by a U.S. collector until Kenneth C. Griffin's ~$300 million purchase of Willem de Kooning's Interchange in September 2015.

== See also ==
- List of most expensive paintings
