= Dora Maar =

French artist and partner of Pablo Picasso (1907–1997)

- Portrait of Maar by Man Ray
- Born: Henriette Theodora Markovitch; 22 November 1907; Paris, France
- Died: 16 July 1997 (aged 89); Paris, France
- Education: School of photography, École des Beaux-Arts, Académie Julian
- Known for: Photography, painting
- Movement: Surrealism
- Partner: Pablo Picasso (1935–1943)

Henriette Theodora Markovitch (22 November 1907 – 16 July 1997), known as Dora Maar, was a French photographer and painter. Maar was both a pioneering Surrealist artist and an antifascist activist. From 1935 to 1943, Maar was in a relationship with Pablo Picasso, and was depicted in a number of paintings, including his Portrait of Dora Maar and Dora Maar au Chat.

Her work ranged from commercial assignments in fashion and advertising to the documentation of social and economic struggles during the Depression. Maar was one of the few photographers to be included in exhibitions of Surrealist work in the 1930s in Paris, New York and London, alongside Man Ray and Salvador Dalí. Her photographs explored psychology, dreams, and inner states.

== Biography ==
=== Early life ===
Maar was born Henriette Theodora Markovitch on 22 November, 1907 in Paris, France. She was the only daughter of Josip Marković, a Croatian-born architect, and Louise-Julie Voisin, a Catholic from Cognac. In 1910, the family left for Buenos Aires, Argentina, where Josip had obtained several commissions, including designing the embassy of Austria-Hungary. His achievements led to him being honoured by Emperor Franz Joseph I. Maar's earliest surviving photographs were taken in the early 1920s while on a cargo ship going to the Cape Verde Islands.

Portrait of Dora Maar, by Pablo Picasso

The family returned to Paris in 1926, when Maar was 19 years old; it was around this time that she adopted the pseudonym Dora Maar. She began to take courses at the Central Union of Decorative Arts and the School of Photography. She also enrolled at the École des Beaux-Arts and the Académie Julian, which had the advantage of offering the same instruction to women as to men. While studying at the École des Beaux-Arts, Maar met fellow female Surrealist Jacqueline Lamba. About her, Maar said, "I was closely linked with Jacqueline. She asked me, "where are those famous surrealists?" and I told her about Café de la Place Blanche." Lamba then began to frequent the cafe where she would eventually meet André Breton, whom she would later marry.

Maar frequented André Lhote's workshop, where she first met Henri Cartier-Bresson. When the workshop ceased its activities, Maar left Paris and traveled to Barcelona and then London, where she photographed the effects of the Great Depression following the Wall Street crash of 1929. Upon returning to Paris, she opened another workshop at 29 Rue d'Astorg in the 8th arrondissement with the help of her father.

=== Work as a Photographer ===
In 1931, Maar established a photography studio with Pierre Kéfer under the name 'Kéfer-Dora Maar.' Kéfer was also a photographer, and worked as a decorator for Jean Epstein's 1928 film, The Fall of the House of Usher. Together, Maar and Kéfer primarily worked on commercial projects for advertisements and fashion magazines, specializing in portraits and nudes. Her father financially assisted her during this period while she was attempting to establish herself as an artist. During this period, Surrealist influences could be seen in her work through her frequent use of mirrors and contrasting shadows.

Maar continued to establish herself as an artist throughout the mid- to late-1930's. In 1932, she had an affair with the filmmaker Louis Chavance, and had her first publication in the magazine Art et Métiers Graphiques. She began to build her reputation as a Surrealist artist, and her work was shown in galleries alongside the work of Man Ray and Salvador Dalí. Her first solo exhibition was held at the Galerie Vanderberg in Paris. During this time, she made a connection with the photographer Brassaï, with whom she shared a darkroom in the studio. Brassaï once said that she had "bright eyes and an attentive gaze, a disturbing stare at times". Maar also met Louis-Victor Emmanuel Sougez, a photographer and artistic director of the newspaper L'Illustration, whom she considered a mentor.

Surrealist concepts and interests often aligned with the ideals of the political left, and so Maar became very politically active at this point in her life. After the fascist demonstrations in Paris on 6 February 1934, Maar signed the tract "Appeal to the Struggle" alongside René Lefeuvre, Jacques Soustelle, Simone Weil, Georges Bataille, and André Breton. She was part of the leftist organizations "Masses", where she first met Georges Bataille; the Union of Intellectuals Against Fascism; and a radical collective of left-wing actors and writers called Groupe Octobre.

==== Surrealism ====
Maar felt that art should represent the content of reality through links with intuitions or ideas, rather than visually reproduce the natural. She created photographs using various techniques, including gelatin silver prints, collage, photomontage, and superimposition. One of her most famous surrealist works is Portrait of Ubu (1936), which represents the eponymous central character of the play Ubu Roi by Alfred Jarry. The work was first shown at the Exposition Surréaliste d'objets at the Galerie Charles Ratton in Paris and at the International Surrealist Exhibition in London in 1936. She also participated in the Fantastic Art, Dada, Surrealism exhibition at the MoMA in New York the same year.

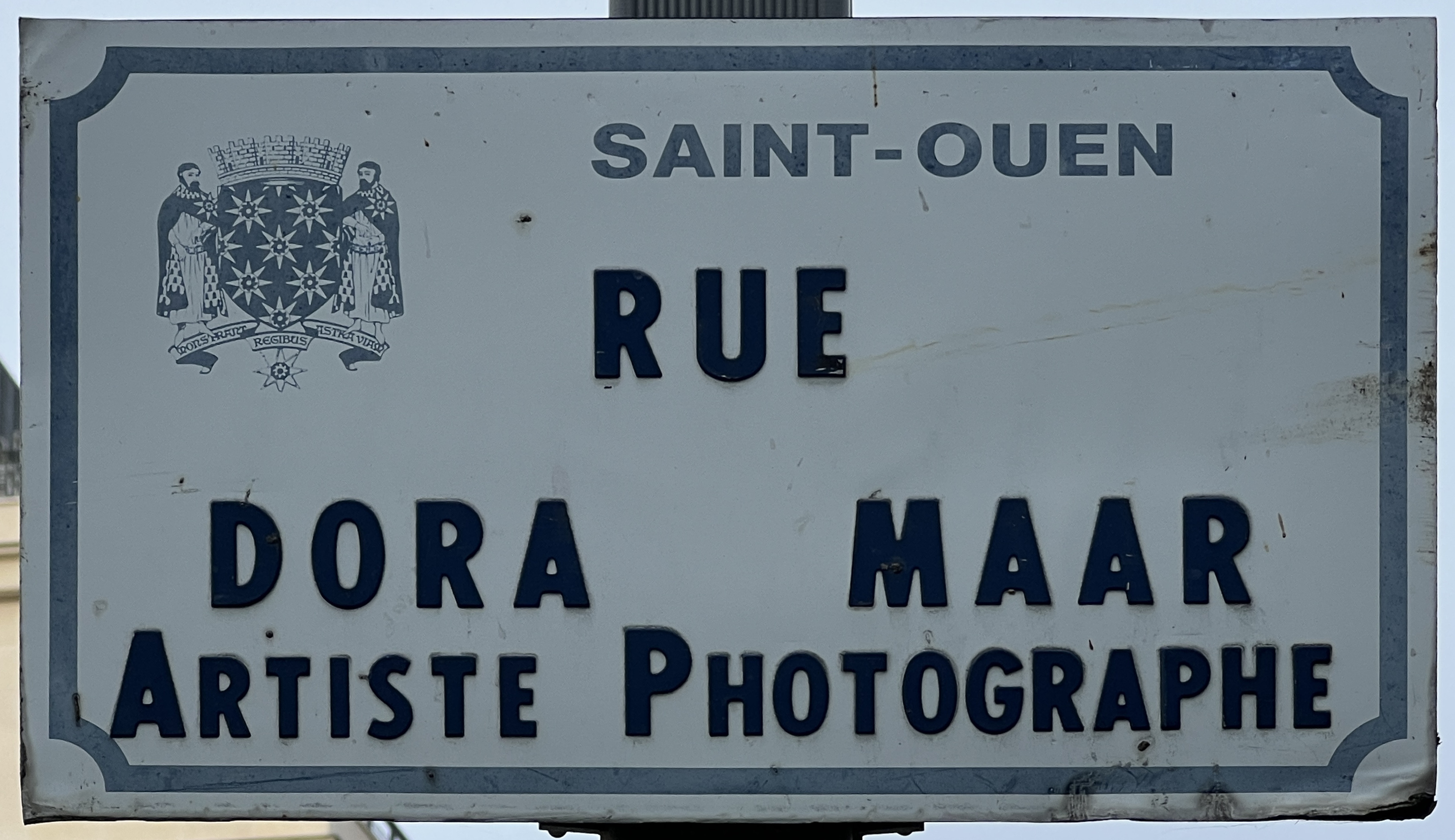
Street plaque "Rue Dora Maar", Saint-Ouen-sur-Seine.

She was also involved in many Surrealist groups and often participated in demonstrations, convocations, and cafe conversations. She signed many manifestos, including one titled "When Surrealists were Right" in August 1935, which concerned the Congress of Paris, which had been held in March of that year.

=== Later years and death ===
Maar struggled with depression throughout her adult life. In 1944, through the intermediary Paul Éluard, Maar met Jacques Lacan, who took care of her after she suffered a nervous breakdown. After years of care, her mental health began to improve. Picasso bought her a home in Ménerbes, Vaucluse, where she retired to live alone. There, she turned to Catholicism and met the painter Nicolas de Staël.

In the 1950s, Maar abandoned photography and took up painting. In the 1960s and 70s, she experimented with abstract formats in shimmering colors. In the 1980s, she began to paint landscapes of the Luberon region at her home in Ménerbes. During this period she also created a number of photograms.

Maar spent her last years in her apartment on Rue de Savoie, in the Left Bank of Paris. She died on 16 July 1997, aged 89, and was buried in the Bois-Tardieu cemetery in Clamart. Her experiments with photograms and darkroom photography were found posthumously.

== Relationship with Picasso ==
Maar first saw Pablo Picasso at the end of 1935 when she was taking promotional shots on the set of the Jean Renoir film The Crime of Monsieur Lange. She was captivated by him, but they did not formally meet. Maar was introduced to Picasso a few days later by their mutual friend Paul Eluard at Café des Deux Magots. The story of their first encounter was told by the writer Jean-Paul Crespelle:

"She kept driving a small pointed pen-knife between her fingers into the wood of the table. Sometimes she missed and a drop of blood appeared between the roses embroidered on her black gloves... Picasso would ask Dora to give him the gloves and would lock them up in the showcase he kept for his mementos."

Maar became Picasso's lover and muse, and he painted many portraits of her throughout their relationship. Their liaison would last nearly nine years, during which time Picasso did not end his relationship with Marie-Thérèse Walter, mother of his daughter Maya Widmaier-Picasso. During their relationship, Picasso physically abused Maar and made her fight with Marie-Thérèse for his affection. Their relationship ended in 1943, although they continued to meet occasionally until 1946. During one of these meetings on 19 March 1944, she played the role of Fat Anguish in the reading of Picasso's first play, Desire Caught by the Tail, led by Albert Camus at the home of Michel Leiris.

=== As Picasso's Muse ===
In the majority of Picasso's paintings depicting Maar, she was represented as a tortured, anguished woman. The most well known of these portraits is The Weeping Woman. She is also depicted in the painting Portrait Dora Maar, and sat as a model for his sculpture titled Monument à Apollinaire, a tribute to the late poet Guillaume Apollinaire. Picasso was very inspired by the tragedies of the Spanish Civil War, and he thought of Maar as a living depiction of the pain and suffering that people experienced during this time. Maar did not appreciate Picasso's depiction of her in this way. When asked about his portraits of her, she said "all portraits of me are lies. They're Picassos. Not one is Dora Maar".

Maar's influence can also be seen in Picasso's anti-war painting Guernica (1937). Maar photographed the successive stages of the creation of the painting at Picasso's studio in the rue des Grands-Augustins from May to June 1937; Picasso used these photographs in his creative process. Maar boosted Picasso's understanding of politics; Amar Singh, curator of the Amar Gallery stated: "She influenced Picasso to paint Guernica— he had never entered political painting before." She also introduced Picasso to the method of combining photography and printmaking, also known as the cliché verre technique.

== Legacy ==
Although Maar is mostly remembered as one of Picasso's lovers, there have been exhibits presenting her as an artist in her own right, including exhibitions at the Haus der Kunst, Munich, October 2001 – January 2002; the Centre de la Vieille Charité, Marseille, January – May 2002; the Centre Cultural Tecla Sala, Barcelona, May – July 2002; the Centre Pompidou, Paris, June – July 2019, the Tate Modern, London, November 2019 – March 2020 and the Amar gallery, London, in June 2024.

Maar was played by Samantha Colley in the 2018 season of Genius, which focuses on the life and art of Picasso. She was played by Julianne Moore in the 1996 feature film Surviving Picasso.
