= Lists of Picasso artworks =

Lists of Picasso artworks include:

- List of Picasso artworks 1889–1900
- List of Picasso artworks 1901–1910
- List of Picasso artworks 1911–1920
- List of Picasso artworks 1921–1930
- List of Picasso artworks 1931–1940
- List of Picasso artworks 1941–1950
- List of Picasso artworks 1951–1960
- List of Picasso artworks 1961–1970
- List of Picasso artworks 1971–1973

== See also ==
- Pablo Picasso
- Picasso's written works
