= Ma Jolie =

Ma Jolie may refer to:

- Ma Jolie (1912), Cubist painting by Pablo Picasso currently located in New York City
- Ma Jolie (1914), oil painting by Pablo Picasso currently located in Indianapolis
