= Ma Jolie (Picasso, Indianapolis) =

Painting by Pablo Picasso

- Artist: Pablo Picasso
- Year: 1913–1914
- Medium: Oil on canvas
- Dimensions: 53.66 cm × 65.09 cm (21.125 in × 25.625 in)
- Location: Indianapolis Museum of Art; Indianapolis

Ma Jolie is an oil on canvas painting by Spanish artist Pablo Picasso, which is located in the Indianapolis Museum of Art, in Indianapolis, Indiana, US. Completed in 1914, its fractured depiction of everyday objects is an example of Cubism. It is not to be confused with the 1912 Picasso of the same name, which is now in the Museum of Modern Art in New York.

== Description ==
Picasso used a limited palette to draw attention to the overlapping, fragmented shapes of common objects including musical instruments, sheet music, glasses, a bottle, and a cigarette. Rather than attempt to copy the world in paint, Picasso used the canvas to experiment with texture and form, fracturing the objects into geometric shapes and depicting them from multiple angles. He also displayed great creativity in the application of the paint, using a comb to create the lines on the sheet music and the recorder's wood grain.

== Background information ==
Ma Jolie ("My Pretty One") was both a popular French song and the nickname of Picasso's lover, Eva Gouel (born Marcelle Humbert). Sheet music for the song can be seen in the background of the painting. This artwork represents Picasso's return to the oil paint medium after a period of experimentation with collage. Instead of using ready-made objects and materials to create textural effects, he used paint to imitate them, essentially reversing his experiments with collage. Using his new knowledge of texture to apply the syntax of collage to a painting, he raised questions about the very nature of the medium.

== Acquisition history ==
Picasso's dealer, Daniel-Henry Kahnweiler sold Ma Jolie to Katherine Dreier, founder and president of the Société Anonymne, in 1922. Theodore Schempp of New York City acquired it in 1942, possibly from Karl Nierendorf. In 1944, the Herron School of Art debated purchasing it for $3,800, a suggestion which Booth Tarkington, chairman of the Fine Arts Committee, laughed out of the room. Tarkington later regretted his display, mockingly justifying that it was "rather a distinction not to have either a Matisse or a Picasso." Devoted patron Caroline Marmon Fesler, who missed the meeting due to illness, purchased the painting on her own and displayed it in the Herron. Upon her death in 1961, it was bequeathed to the IMA. It is currently on display in the William L. and Jane H. Fortune Gallery and has the acquisition number 61.36.
