= Lespinasse =

Lespinasse or de Lespinasse may refer to:

- Lespinasse (restaurant), a former restaurant in Manhattan, New York
- Lespinasse, Haute-Garonne, France

== People ==
- Augustin de Lespinasse (1737–1816), French military leader
- Ernest Lespinasse (1897–1927), French Olympic gymnast
- Gabrielle Lespinasse (1888–c. 1970), French muse for the Spanish artist Pablo Picasso
- Jeanne Julie Éléonore de Lespinasse (1732–1776), French salon holder
- René de Lespinasse (1843–1922), French historian and politician

== See also ==
- Lespinassière, Aude, France
- Saint-Forgeux-Lespinasse, Loire, France
- Saint-Germain-Lespinasse, Loire, France
- Saint-Jean-Lespinasse, Lot, France
- Saint-Vincent-Lespinasse, Tarn-et-Garonne, France
- Espinasse (disambiguation)
