= List of Picasso artworks 1921–1930 =

== 1921 ==
- Three Musicians (two versions)
- Three Women at the Spring
- Mother and Child
- Dog and Cock
- Reading the Letter (La Lecture de la Lettre)

== 1922 ==
- Deux femmes courant sur la plage (La Course)

== 1923 ==
- The Pipes of Pan (La flûte de Pan) - Musée Picasso, Paris
- Olga with a Fur Collar
- La Lettre (La Réponse)
- Los Enamorados ("The Lovers")
- Harlequin (Arlequin) - Centre Pompidou, Musée National d'Art Moderne
- Mother and Child
- Two Nudes
- Portrait d'Olga

== 1924 ==
- Picasso painted the walls of the garage at the Villa La Vigie in Juan-les-Pins during late July, the owner insisted that they be repainted. No photographs exist of the walls.
- Still Life with Biscuits - Cleveland Museum of Art, Cleveland, Ohio
- Still Life with Mandolin - Stedelijk Museum, Amsterdam
- Still Life with a Mandolin - National Gallery of Ireland, Dublin
- Mandolin with Guitar - Solomon R. Guggenheim Museum, New York City
- Juan-les-Pins - Sold by Heinz Berggruen in 1961 to Mr & Mrs Walter Oppenheimer; in their collection from 1961 to 2007. Sold at Christie's 2007 and sold at Sotheby's in 2018.
- Trois Baigneuses - Acquired by a Scandinavian private collector from Perls Galleries, New York in 1989; sold by them at Sotheby's in 2019 for $1.095 million.
- Snow Landscape
- Still Life with Mandolin and Galette, Oil and sand on canvas, 38 1/2 x 51 1/2 in. (97.8 x 130.8 cm), Metropolitan Museum of Art, New York

== 1925 ==
- Mandolin, Fruit Bowl, and Plaster Arm, Oil on canvas, 38 1/2 x 51 1/2 in. (97.8 x 130.8 cm), Metropolitan Museum of Art, New York
- The Three Dancers (Les Trois Danseuses) - Tate, London

== 1926 ==
- Head (Tête) - Cleveland Museum of Art, Cleveland, Ohio
- Scène d'Intérieur - two versions at University of Michigan Museum of Art

== 1927 ==
- Seated Woman
- Les Trois Amies (The Three Friends) - University of Michigan Museum of Art
- Painter Working, observed by a nude model. Plate VIII for Balzac, 'Le Chef-d'oeu - University of Michigan Museum of Art
- Bull and Horse. (Taureau et Cheval) Plate III for Balzac, Le Chef-d'oeuvre inco - University of Michigan Museum of Art
- Harlequin, Oil on canvas, 32 in. × 25 5/8 in. (81.3 × 65.1 cm), Metropolitan Museum of Art, New York
- Head of a Woman, Oil and charcoal on canvas, 21 3/4 x 13 1/4 in. (55.2 x 33.7 cm), Metropolitan Museum of Art, New York

== 1928 ==
- The Studio

== 1929 ==
- Woman in a Red Armchair - Menil Collection, Houston

== 1930 ==
- Hand with Bouquet
- Seated Bather
- Crucifixion

== Selected works ==
1921, Three Musicians, Museum of Modern Art, New York

1921, Three Musicians, Philadelphia Museum of Art

1921, Head of a Woman, Metropolitan Museum of Art, New York

1921, Seated Nude Drying her Foot, Berggruen Museum

1921-22, The Bathers

1922, Four Bathers

1924, Still Life with Biscuits, Cleveland Museum of Art

1926, Head, Cleveland Museum of Art
