= List of Picasso artworks 1951–1960 =

This is a partial list of artworks produced by Pablo Picasso from 1951 to 1960.

== 1951 ==
- Massacre in Korea (1951)
- Baboon and Young (1951)
- The election of Paris (1951)

== 1952 ==
- Crâne de chèvre, bouteille et bougie (1952)
- Paysage mediterranéen (1952)
- The Dove with the Rainbow Background (1952)

== 1954 ==
- Sylvette (1954)
- Jacqueline with flowers (1954)
- Jaqueline with crossed hands (1954)
- Two Monkeys (May 11, 1954)

== 1955 ==
- Don Quixote (1955)
- Les Femmes d'Alger series (1955)
  - Les Femmes d'Alger ("Version A")
  - Les Femmes d'Alger ("Version B")
  - Les Femmes d'Alger ("Version C")
  - Les Femmes d'Alger ("Version D")
  - Les Femmes d'Alger ("Version E")
  - Les Femmes d'Alger ("Version F")
  - Les Femmes d'Alger ("Version G")
  - Les Femmes d'Alger ("Version H")
  - Les Femmes d'Alger ("Version I")
  - Les Femmes d'Alger ("Version J")
  - Les Femmes d'Alger ("Version K")
  - Les Femmes d'Alger ("Version L")
  - Les Femmes d'Alger ("Version M")
  - Les Femmes d'Alger ("Version N")
  - Les Femmes d'Alger ("Version O")
- Mujer en espejo (17 June 1955)
- Face (ceramic pitcher, 1955)

== 1956 ==
- Femme dans l'atelier (Jacqueline Roque), 1956
- Femmes devant la mer (1956)
- Toro (30 March 1956)
- Personnage assis et personnage couché (1956)
- Dans L'Atelier de Cannes (1956)

== 1957 ==
- La Petite Corrida (1957)
- Las meninas (1957)
- La danse des fauns (1957)

== 1958 ==
- La Folie (January 26, 1958)
- Hands with Bouquet (1958)
- Joueur de Flûte (23 August 1958)
- Bulls-Vallaruis (1958)

== 1959 ==
- Nude under a Pine Tree (1959)
- Mujer delante del espejo (16 August 1959)
- Scène de corrida (1959)
- Un esbozo de mujer (30 April 1959)
- Le Vieux Roi (1959)

== 1960 ==
- Arles: El ruedo delante del Ródano (1960)
- In The Arena 25.2.60, lithograph (1960)
- El Picador 15.6.60, lithograph (1960)
- Femme accroupie (1960)
- Bust of a Seated Woman (Jacqueline Roque) (April–May 1960)
- Tête de femme (Dora Maar) (1950s)
