= Ma Jolie (Picasso, New York) =

Painting by Pablo Picasso

Ma Jolie is a 1911–1912 Cubist painting by Pablo Picasso. It relies on abstract meanings and concepts such as signified and signifier. It is now in the Museum of Modern Art in New York City. It is not to be confused with the 1914 Picasso of the same name, now in the Indianapolis Museum of Art.

Picasso's mistress at the time was Eva Gouel (whose real name was Marcelle Humbert). His nickname for her was Ma Jolie; she died in 1915. Ma Jolie was also the refrain of a popular song of the day. The picture also implies a bowl of fruit situated on top of the woman's head, alluding to the abstract roots of his works before the onset of the First World War.
