= Harlequin (1915) =

Painting by Pablo Picasso

- Artist: Pablo Picasso
- Year: 1915
- Movement: Cubism
- Dimensions: 6' 1/4" x 41 3/8"
- Location: Museum of Modern Art, New York, USA

Harlequin is an oil painting by Spanish artist Pablo Picasso. It was created in December of 1915 in the style of cubism. The painting shows a painter holding an unfinished painting.
