= Gabrielle Lespinasse =

Parisian muse for the Spanish artist Pablo Picasso

- Born: Gabrielle Depeyre; 1888; Paris, France
- Died: c. 1970
- Known for: Picasso's muse
- Spouse: Herbert Lespinasse (1884-1972)

Gabrielle Lespinasse (1888 – c. 1970) was a Parisian muse for the Spanish artist Pablo Picasso. Their love affair from 1915 to 1916 remained secret until 1987 when it was finally made public with the disclosure of previously unknown Picasso artwork.

== Biography ==
Gabrielle Lespinasse, born Gabrielle Depeyre in Paris, France, was called Gaby by Picasso.

The exact circumstances by which Lespinasse and Pablo Picasso met is in doubt, but the romance between the 27-year-old Parisian and the 34-year-old artist appears to have begun in the autumn of 1915 while Picasso's previous partner, Eva Gouel, was fatally ill with tuberculosis.

=== Loving Picasso ===
Lespinasse lived on the top floor of a house on Boulevard Raspail, near the painter's Paris studio.

"Gaby", as Picasso called her, was a "ravishing girl," "a great beauty, especially in profile, with her fluffy bangs, big moody eyes and a beautiful, upturned nose [...] One of those relaxed, cat-like girls, as she dreamed of Colette." according to biographer, art critic and Picasso confidante John Richardson.

There were two reasons for secrecy. First was Eva Gouel's deadly illness (she died in 1915). Another was the well-established relationship between Gaby and a Franco-American artist and poet, Herbert Lespinasse (1884-1972), whose name she had already adopted, even before her marriage to him. The wealthy Herbert Lespinasse was one of the first artists to settle in the small French port of Saint-Tropez on the Mediterranean Sea and his house there became a gathering place for Parisian bohemians. Apparently, Picasso and Gaby used it as a place to stay, as did many other artists and intellectuals who had fled Paris during World War I. In November and December 1915, Picasso was almost always there to see Gabrielle.

Picasso wooed Lespinasse with naturalistic drawings and watercolors, more to flatter her than to advance his art. "The many portrait sketches he made of her - while charming - are too slight to be considered a major part of his work."

On some drawings and on many wooden frames, he left compromising messages of love that were only meant for the two of them. Most of Picasso's messages in the drawings were later blurred out before they were sold. In many cases, only the dedication de tout mon cœur (English: "from my whole heart") and the Picasso's signature were preserved. On one passe-partout (mat) of the collage of a rectangular text (Je t'aime Gaby) with an ornamental border, surrounded by four oval miniatures and two oval miniature photographs, there is a short note from Picasso: J'ai demandé ta main au Bon Dieu. Paris 22 Fevrier 1916 (English: "I asked God for your hand. Paris, 22 February 1916"). On examination, John Richardson opined that the document was the first serious marriage intention of the Picasso, a self-declared atheist who had previously strictly denied his faith and had never shown any interest in marriage.

In addition to the portraits Picasso painted for her, he also made watercolors Provencal Interiors (bedroom, dining room, kitchen), presumably interior views of Herbert Lespinasse's house in Saint-Tropez, and made a necklace of painted wooden balls with different geometric motifs. The four miniature masterpieces on the marriage proposal (Richardson called them "whimsical") were three oval cubist still lifes and an allegorical portrait of the Gaby but concluded "the many portrait sketches he made of her - while charming - are too slight to be considered a major part of his work."

=== Marriages ===
Gaby rejected Picasso's marriage proposal and married Herbert Lespinasse on 23 April 1917 in Saint-Tropez. Picasso rebounded from his failure with Gaby in the spring of 1916 by beginning an affair with the artist Irène Lagut, but she also thwarted his marriage plans. Later he moved from Paris to Rome, where he met and married the Russian ballet dancer Olga Khoklova (1891–1955).

=== Art sale ===
In the late 1950s, John Richardson, former head of the U.S. branch of Christie's auction house, first learned about the connection between Lespinasse and Picasso when Gaby inquired about selling some Picasso portraits of her. When Richardson, a close friend of Picasso, showed him photographs of them. "He was obviously delighted to see her, but angry to be reminded of an episode he chose to forget," said Richardson.

After Gaby and her husband both died in the early 1970s, one of her nieces sold the collection to art collector and Picasso expert Douglas Cooper. The collection included works of art and love letters from Picasso as well as other official documents such as marriage and death certificates. Cooper chose not to publicize the collection's existence, which was the only physical evidence of the affair. With Cooper's death in 1984, his adopted son William McCarty Cooper offered Richardson complete access to the collection. In the October 1987 issue of the magazine House & Garden, he was first to announce the collection's existence, and that announcement coincided with an exhibit of the work at the Kunstmuseum in Basel, Switzerland, and later in the Tate gallery in London.

=== Stage performances ===
In 1996, playwright Brian McAvera wrote a script in 1996 called Picasso's Women, which was staged as a press conference, and broadcast in several parts on British radio, in which three of Picasso's former women, including Gabrielle Lespinasse, remember living together with the artist.

In the spring of 2000, Picasso's Women premiered as a play in Great Britain. The German premiere took place in early January 2003 in Chemnitz with the actress Barbara Geiger playing the part of Lespinasse. As recently as 2020, new bookings have been scheduled.

== External sources ==
- Brian McAvera: Picasso's women. Oberon, London 1999, ISBN 1-870259-86-6.
- Sidney Beat: Picasso, Love and the Côte d'Azur. In: Cigar Clan, 4/2006
- John Richardson: Picasso's Secret Love. In: Catalog of the exhibition of the Kunstmuseum Basel and the Tate Gallery, London, Douglas Cooper and the Masters of Cubism, Basel Public Art Collection, Basel, 1987, pp. 183–196.
- John Richardson, The Cubist Rebel, 1907-1916 (Vol 2). Random House, New York 1996, ISBN 978-0-375-71150-3
