= Espinasse =

Espinasse may refer to:

- Espinasse, Cantal, France
- Espinasse, Puy-de-Dôme, France
- Espinasse-Vozelle, France
- Charles-Marie-Esprit Espinasse {1815-1859}, French general and Minister of the Interior
- Francis Espinasse (1823–1912), Scottish journalist
- Isaac Espinasse, author of Espinasse's Reports

== See also ==
- Espinasses, Hautes-Alpes, France
- Lespinasse (disambiguation)
