= Baboon and Young =

Bronze sculpture by Pablo Picasso

Baboon and Young (French: La guenon et son petit) is a bronze sculpture by Pablo Picasso. It depicts a female baboon standing up, holding its offspring.

Picasso made the sculpture at his villa near Vallauris in October 1951, adding some plaster modelling to an assemblage of items. An example of the use of found objects in art, the assemblage includes two toy cars forming the female baboon's head, a pottery jar for its body, and an automobile spring for its tail.

== Background ==
Picasso's domestic arrangements found expression in his artwork in figures of nurturing or caring. La guenon et son petit was prefigured by his sculpture Homme et mouton ("Man and sheep") made in Paris in October 1944 and exhibited at the Salon d'Automne in October 1945; a cast was unveiled in the centre of Vallauris in 1950. It was followed by his 1950 works Femme enceinte ("Pregnant woman"), Chèvre ("She-Goat") and Femme à la pousette ("Woman with pushchair"), taking inspiration from Françoise and the children. All use the technique of assemblage which Picasso has used since at least 1914. La guenon et son petit can be seen as the pinnacle and ultimate end point of this line of work using free modelling added to found objects.

== Assemblage ==
The cars that form the baboon's head were given to Picasso's son Claude Picasso in 1951 by the art dealer Daniel-Henry Kahnweiler. As Françoise later explained, Claude as an infant had a tendency to break his toys with a hammer, but the cars remained whole until his father borrowed them later in 1951. Picasso placed one car on top of the other, with their undersides together. On top was a model of a Panhard Dyna X, with its windscreen forming the baboon's eyes, and the car's bonnet for the nose. Underneath was an upside-down Renault, reversed so its boot is the baboon's lower jaw.

Picasso used a rounded pignate pot to create baboon's body, cutting it with a knife to outline breasts and nipples. The pot's volute handles created the animal's shoulders. The handles of other broken pottery (cups or pitchers) served for its ears, and its legs were made of wood, with a tail formed by an automobile's leaf spring. Picasso added plaster to complete the model, including the baboon's arms holding a baby that appears like a small human figure, creating a figure reminiscent of a Madonna and Child.

The completed work measures 54.6 × 33.3 × 61.0 centimetres (21.5 × 13.1 × 24.0 in). It was cast in bronze using a lost wax process at the Valsuani foundry in Paris. The plaster original is held by the Musée Picasso in Paris.

== Interpretation ==
By the time when the sculpture was made in 1951, Picasso's relationship with Françoise was worsening, and he had started an affair with poet Geneviève Laporte. The Panhard may be a reference to a road trip that Picasso took with Laporte in late July 1950, travelling in a Panhard with poet Paul Éluard and his second wife, Dominique, to Eluard's apartment in Saint-Tropez.

Although the baboon appears to be female, it may be intended to represent the nurturing side of Picasso himself – then a 70-year-old man, balding with prominent ears, but stocky and powerful, with penetrating eyes. The baby may represent a human child – a reversal of the human figure carrying an animal in Homme at mouton.

Françoise ended her relationship with Picasso in 1953, taking Claude and Paloma to Paris. Subsequently, his interest in children as subjects diminished. He continued to make small sculptures, and later monumental steel works, but left behind his playful assemblages.

Examples are held by a variety of public museums An example cast in 1951 sold a Christie's in November 2002 for $6,719,500.
