= List of Picasso artworks 1971–1973 =

This is a partial list of artworks by Pablo Picasso produced from 1971–1973. Picasso celebrated his ninetieth birthday in 1971, and remained productive until his death two years later.

1970

- Picasso's Suite 156 (156 series) of 156 etchings was completed shortly before his death, having been begun in 1970.

1971

- At Work (Oil on canvas, 161.9 x 130.2 cm, MoMA)
- Galerie Louise Leiris, Picasso (Lithograph, 75.8 x 50.2 cm, MoMA)
- Monument (Cor-Ten steel, (395.3 x 149.2 x 319.3 cm) including base, MoMA)
- Pirosmanachvili à son chevalet from Pirosmanachvili 1914 (Drypoint, plate: 16 x 10 cm, MoMA)
- Four Characters or The Conversation (Pencil, ink, gouache and marker on paper, 32.5 x 50 cm, Museu Picasso)
- Tête d'homme (Brush, ink and gouache on card, 28 x 21.7 cm)
