= List of Picasso artworks 1961–1970 =

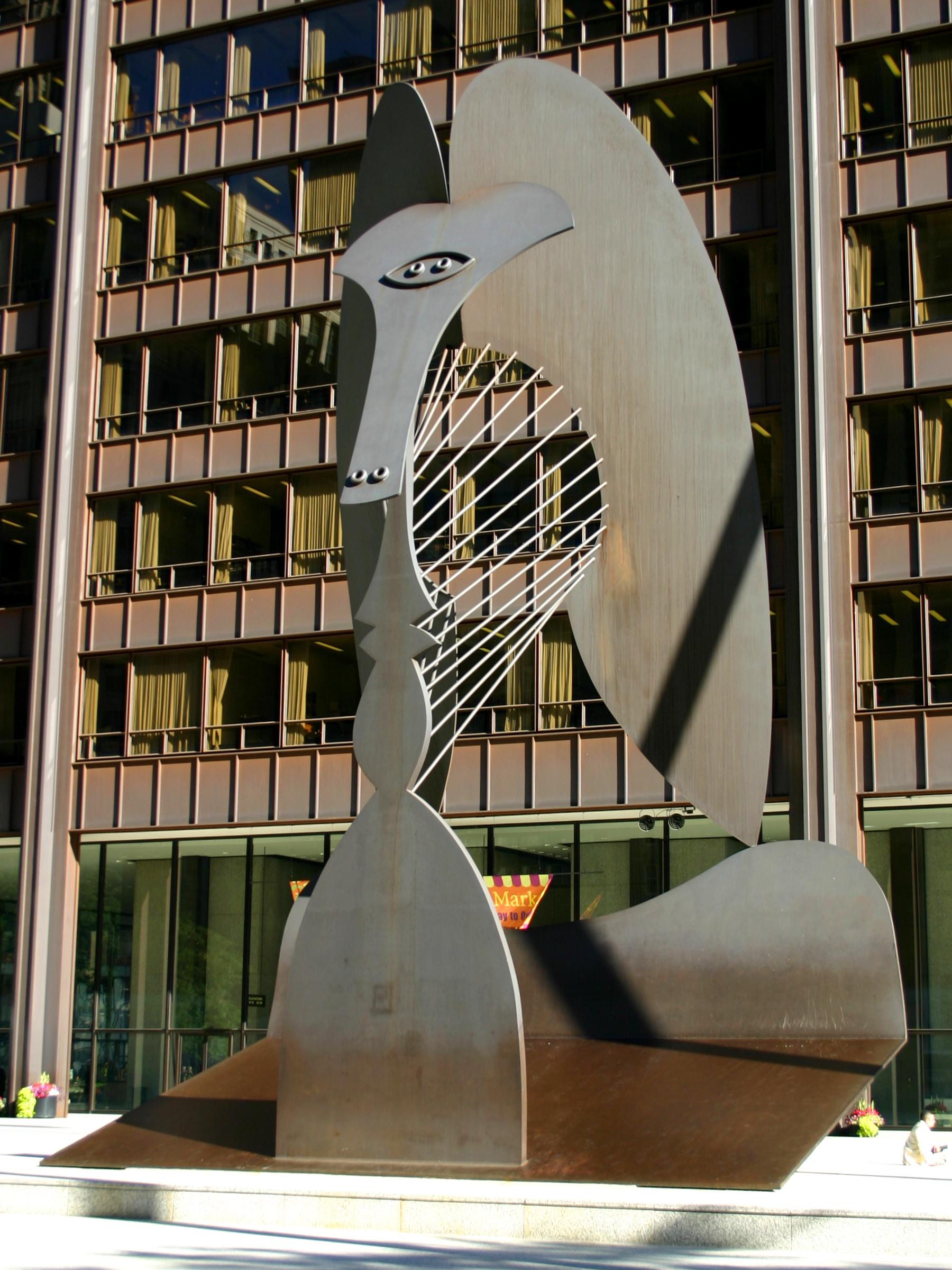
The Chicago Picasso, 1967

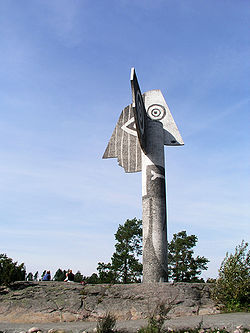
In 1964, Pablo Picasso approved the construction of one of his sculptures, depicting his wife Jacqueline, to be erected in Kristinehamn (Sweden) at Strandudden by lake Vänern. Carl Nesjar was commissioned to carry out the construction. The Picasso sculpture in Kristinehamn Sweden was inaugurated in 1965, is 15 meters high, and is the largest Picasso sculpture in the world.

Pablo Picasso, Nude Woman with Necklace ("Femme nue au collier"), 1968, oil on canvas, 113.5 x 161.7 cm. The face is of his second wife, Jacqueline Roquet.

This is a partial list of artworks produced by Pablo Picasso from 1961 to 1970.

- 1961, The Dance of Youth
- 1961, Les Freres Sole
- 1961, Jacqueline
- 1961, Luncheon on the Grass
- 1961, La Chaise
- 1962, Côte d'Azur
- 1962 Jacqueline au ruban jaune (Jacqueline with a Yellow Ribbon), cut and painted sheet metal, National Gallery of Iceland, Reykjavík, Iceland.
- 1962, Bust of a Woman with a Hat (Private Collection)
- 1962, Femme au Chien, Wynn Fine Art, Florida
- 1963, Nu assis dans un fauteuil (See the picture and description here)
- 1963, Man and Woman, etching, aquatint and drypoint on paper, University of Michigan Museum of Art
- 1963, Le Peintre, destroyed in 1998 in the crash of Swissair Flight 111.
- 1964, The Smoker, Aquatint on paper.
- 1965, The Picasso Sculpture, a sculpture in Kristinehamn Sweden depicting Pablo Picasso's wife Jaqueline.
- 1966, Woman with Bird, aquatint on paper, University of Michigan Museum of Art
- 1966, Artist in His Studio (L'atelier de l'artiste), aquatint, etching and drypoint on paper, University of Michigan Museum of Art
- 1967, 15 August, the Chicago Picasso is unveiled at Chicago's Richard J. Daley Center Plaza.
- 1967, Femme nue à l'oiseau et joueur de flûte (See the picture and description here)
- 1967, Woman and Musketeer, oil on canvas, Metropolitan Museum of Art
- 1968, Standing Nude and Seated Musketeer, oil on canvas, Metropolitan Museum of Art
- 1968, Etreinte (The Embrace), etching on paper, University of Michigan Museum of Art
- 1968, Homme Arretant un Cheval Devant une Femme, etching and aquatint
- 1968, Homme et femme nus, Painted in Mougins on 13 November 1968
- 1969, Hombre sentado con pipa (L'homme à la pipe assis)
- 1969, Man with the Golden Helmet
- 1969, The Kiss
- 1969, El Toro
- 1969, Toro Y Toreros
- 1969, El Buho
- 1970, The Matador
- 1970, The Fisherman, Regjeringskvartalet, Oslo, Norway.
- 1970, Young Spanish Peasant, color lithograph
- 1970, Sylvette, sculpture based on the Sylvette series of artworks
