= Eva Gouel =

Second girlfriend of Pablo Picasso

- Born: Eve Gouel; 1885; Vincennes, France
- Died: December 14, 1915 (age 30); Paris, France
- Known for: Second girlfriend of Pablo Picasso

Eva Gouel (1885–December 14, 1915) was a French choreographer and the second girlfriend of the Spanish painter Pablo Picasso during the early 1910s. She was the inspiration for several of his paintings, including Ma Jolie (1912).

== Death ==
On December 14, 1915, Gouel died from tuberculosis at the age of 30. Picasso was devastated by her death. His 1915 painting, Harlequin, shows his sorrow.
