= The Four Little Girls =

1949 play by Pablo Picasso

The Four Little Girls (Les Quatre Petites Filles) is a play written in French by the painter Pablo Picasso. It is the second of two full-length plays written by Picasso, the first being Desire Caught by the Tail. Written between November 24, 1947, and August 13, 1948, it was published in 1949. In 1952 Picasso wrote a second version of the play using the same title.

Both versions use a stream of consciousness narrative style, and many critics believe that Picasso never meant for the play to be staged, only read.
