= Cache-sexe =

Item, often a small garment, that covers its user's genitals

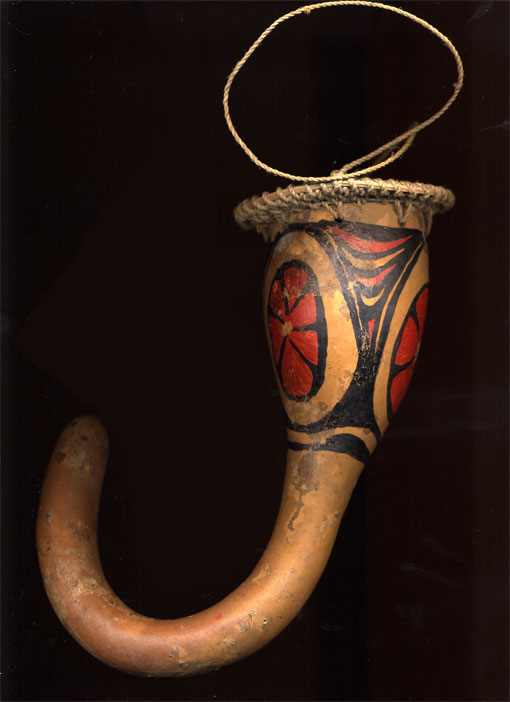
The koteka or penis sheath is traditionally worn by male natives of some ethnic groups in New Guinea to cover their genitals.

A cache-sexe is an item, often a small garment, that covers its user's genitals. The most common style, seen in Western G-strings and Japanese fundoshis, has a triangle of material (cloth, beaded strings, etc.) attached at the corners to straps or strings around the waist and between the legs, that fasten the triangle over the genitals.

Cache-sexes have various social intentions, including the wearer's practice of sincere or enforced modesty, legal and/or customary restrictions within the context of intentional eroticism, and adding fetishistic or playfully teasing aspects to intentional eroticism. In Western cultures, for example, G-strings appear as swimming attire; for many erotic dancing venues, as the final state of undress, set as the polite and/or legal limit; or as a garment whose removal is one of many steps of a striptease, each existing to provide an increment in the viewer's sexual arousal.

Cache-sexe is a loanword from French.

Cache-sexe is also an alternate term for modesty plate, sometimes caping, a small triangular or heart-shaped jewelry worn to hide the genitals, typically made of silver, gold, or brass.

== Examples ==
The penis gourds of tribal New Guinea, and cache-sexes of some other tribal cultures, are often perceived by Westerners as self-evidently obvious forms of sexual display, but described by their wearers as a practice providing privacy.

The Brazilian Portuguese tapa-sexo is often used in samba school parades, where performers may parade their decorated but unclothed bodies, exposing the buttocks and groin. The regulations in these parades generally prohibit people being completely naked. Thus, the tapa-sexo, a strip of tape or cloth that strategically covers a dancer's genitalia, prevents the school being penalised in such cases.

== See also ==
- Bikini
- Fig leaf
- Loincloth
- Undergarment
