= Three Women at the Spring =

1921 painting by Pablo Picasso

- Artist: Pablo Picasso
- Year: 1921
- Location: Museum of Modern Art, New York City

Three Women at the Spring is a series of oil paintings by Pablo Picasso in the Neoclassical style. The paintings were painted in the summer of 1921 in Fontainebleau, France, at the same time he painted Three Musicians. Each painting features three young women posed at a fountain. Picasso uses the three women's hand gestures to establish mood and suggest ritual.
