= Three Musicians (Picasso) =

1921 cubist paintings by Pablo Picasso

- Los Tres Músicos (Spanish)
- Artist: Pablo Picasso
- Year: 1921
- Medium: Oil on canvas
- Movement: Synthetic Cubism
- Dimensions: 200.7 cm × 222.9 cm (79.0 in × 87.8 in)
- Location: Museum of Modern Art, New York. Mrs. Simon Guggenheim Fund, 1949

Three Musicians
- Los Tres Mùsicos (Spanish)
- Artist: Pablo Picasso
- Year: 1921
- Medium: Oil on canvas
- Movement: Synthetic Cubism
- Dimensions: 204.5 cm × 188.3 cm (80.5 in × 74.1 in)
- Location: Philadelphia Museum of Art. A.E. Gallitan Collection, 1952

Three Musicians, also known as Musicians with Masks or Musicians in Masks, is a large oil painting created by Spanish artist Pablo Picasso. He painted two versions of Three Musicians. Both versions were completed in the summer of 1921 in Fontainebleau near Paris, France, in the garage of a villa that Picasso was using as his studio. They exemplify the Synthetic Cubist style; the flat planes of color and "intricate puzzle-like composition" giving the appearance of cutout paper with which the style originated. These paintings each colorfully represent three figures wearing masks. The two figures in the center and left are wearing the costumes of Pierrot and Harlequin from the popular Italian theater Commedia dell'arte, and the figure on the right is dressed as a monk. In one version, there also is a dog underneath the table.

Although both versions share the same subject, the darker version today is more famous than the other.

== Description ==
The Pierrot is believed to represent the poet Guillaume Apollinaire, the Harlequin is believed to represent Picasso, and the monk is believed to represent the poet Max Jacob. Apollinaire and Jacob were close friends of Picasso during the 1910s. However, Apollinaire died from the Spanish flu on November 9, 1918, and Jacob entered a Benedictine monastery in June 1921.

=== MoMA version ===
The setting of this version is a bare, dark brown, boxlike space, where the floor is a lighter brown color than the walls. Unscrambling the jigsaw in this one is quite a challenge.

In the space are three figures behind a table. On the table are still-life objects, which Picasso identified as a pipe, a package of tobacco, and a pouch.

The figure on the left is the Pierrot, the sad clown from Commedia dell'arte. He has a white pointy hat, a black eye mask, a blue and white body, and white pants. He is playing a gray clarinet. His small brown hands are disproportionate to the rest of his body.

The figure in the middle is the Harlequin. He's dressed in a red and yellow diamond pattern and is playing a yellow guitar. The guitar and his body are quite easy to make out. His blue mask is part of a larger shape that covers much of the Pierrot and it's topped off by a black, round hat. The figure on the right is the monk. He wears a black robe and is holding sheet music. He has a square nose with a stringy beard.

In this version, Picasso also included a dark brown dog underneath the table but it is mostly hidden. Its tail is seen flicking upward between the Harlequin's legs, its body and one of its rear legs between the Pierrot's legs, and its two front legs on the far left of the floor between the left table leg and the left wall. Not its head, but the shadow of his head, is seen on the back wall.

=== Philadelphia version differences ===
- No dog in this painting
- Harlequin is playing a violin
- Pierrot and Harlequin have changed places
- The floor is orange, not brown
- The sheet music is on the table rather than being held by one of the musicians

== History ==
Picasso worked on both versions simultaneously. At the same time, he also painted Three Women at the Spring. According to old photos, the Philadelphia version originally only had the Pierrot and Harlequin but Picasso later added the monk.

At the end of summer 1921, the canvases were untacked from the garage walls, rolled up, and transported. One version was acquired by Paul Rosenberg. The other was acquired by Albert Eugene Gallatin.

In 1949, Paul Rosenberg sold his painting to the Museum of Modern Art, and it was acquired through the Mrs. Simon Guggenheim Fund.

In 2023, an exhibition at the Museum of Modern Art reunited the two versions with two versions of Three Women at the Spring which were created at the same time.

== In popular culture ==
In The Simpsons episode "Mom and Pop Art", Homer has a dream where the Three Musicians turn their instruments into guns and shoot at him.

== See also ==
- Crystal Cubism
- Three Women at the Spring (Picasso)
