= Pablo Picasso =

Spanish painter and sculptor (1881–1973)

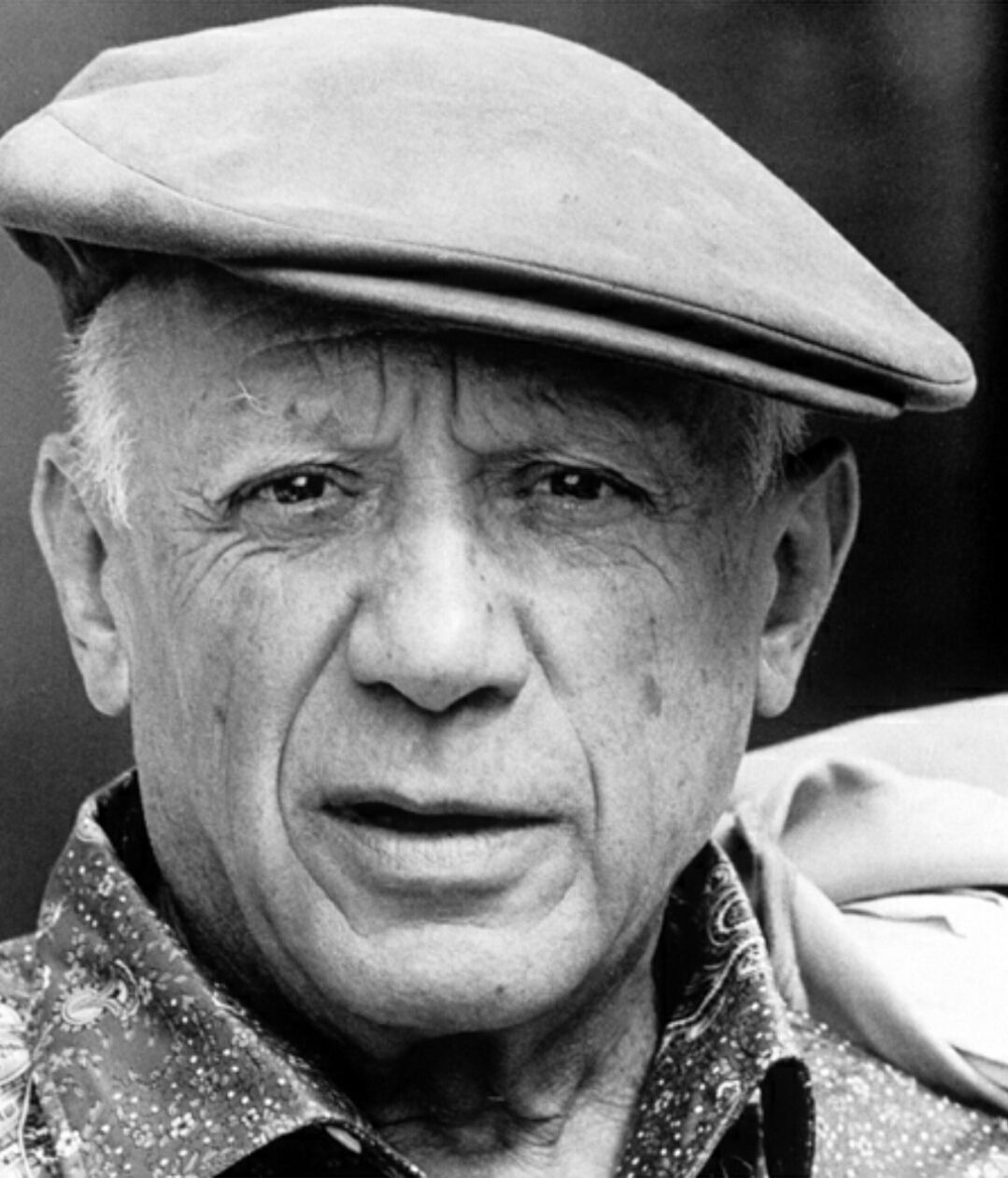
- Picasso in 1962
- Born: Pablo Diego José Francisco de Paula Juan Nepomuceno María de los Remedios Cipriano de la Santísima Trinidad Ruiz y Picasso; 25 October 1881; Málaga, Andalusia, Spain
- Died: 8 April 1973 (aged 91); Mougins, Alpes-Maritimes, France
- Resting place: Château of Vauvenargues, Vauvenargues; 43.554142°N 5.604438°E
- Education: Real Academia de Bellas Artes de San Fernando
- Years active: 1897–1973
- Known for: Painting, drawing, sculpture
- Notable work: La Vie (1903); The Old Guitarist (1903–1904); Family of Saltimbanques (1905); Les Demoiselles d'Avignon (1907); Portrait of Daniel-Henry Kahnweiler (1910); Three Musicians (1921); Girl before a Mirror (1932); Le Rêve (1932); Guernica (1937); The Weeping Woman (1937); Chicago Picasso (1967)
- Movement: Cubism, Surrealism
- Spouses: Olga Khokhlova (m. 1918; sep. 1941) Jacqueline Roque (m. 1961)
- Partners: Fernande Olivier (1905–1912); Eva Gouel (1912–1915); Gabrielle Depeyre (1915–1916); Irène Lagut (1916–1917); Marie-Thérèse Walter (1927–1935); Dora Maar (1935–1943); Françoise Gilot (1943–1953)
- Children: Paulo Picasso; Maya Widmaier-Picasso; Claude Picasso; Paloma Picasso
- Father: José Ruiz y Blasco
- Relatives: Marina Picasso (granddaughter); Bernard Ruiz-Picasso (grandson)
- Awards: Lenin Peace Prize
- Patrons: Eugenia Errázuriz; Sergei Shchukin; Gertrude Stein
- Pablo Picasso's voice Recorded c. 1960s

Pablo Ruiz Picasso (Note: Pronounced UK: /ˈpæbloʊ pɪˈkæsoʊ/, US: /ˈpɑːbloʊ pɪˈkɑːsoʊ, -ˈkæs-/; Spanish: [ˈpaβlo piˈkaso].) (Note: In this Spanish name, the first or paternal surname is Ruiz and the second or maternal family name is Picasso. Picasso's full name includes various saints and relatives. According to his birth certificate, issued on 28 October 1881, he was born Pablo Diego José Francisco de Paula Juan Nepomuceno Cipriano de la Santísima Trinidad Ruiz Picasso. According to the record of his baptism, he was named Pablo Diego José Francisco de Paula Juan Nepomuceno Crispín Cipriano (other sources: Crispiniano) de la Santísima Trinidad María de los Remedios Alarcón y Herrera Ruiz Picasso. He was named Juan Nepomuceno after his godfather, a lawyer, friend of the family, called Juan Nepomuceno Blasco y Barroso. He was named Crispín Cipriano after the twin saints celebrated on 25 October, his birth date. Nepomuceno's wife and Picasso's godmother, María de los Remedios Alarcón y Herrera, was also honoured in Picasso's baptismal name.) (25 October 1881 – 8 April 1973) was a Spanish painter, sculptor, printmaker, and ceramicist who spent most of his adult life in France. As one of the most influential artists of the 20th century, he is known for co-founding the Cubist movement, the invention of constructed sculpture, the co-invention of collage, producing 50,000 artworks across diverse mediums, and for the wide variety of styles that he helped develop and explore. Among his most famous works are the proto-Cubist Les Demoiselles d'Avignon (1907) and the anti-war painting Guernica (1937), a dramatic portrayal of the bombing of Guernica by German and Italian air forces during the Spanish Civil War. His career spanned more than 76 years, from his late teens to his death in 1973.

Beginning his formal training under his father José Ruiz y Blasco aged seven, Picasso demonstrated extraordinary artistic talent from a young age, painting in a naturalistic manner through his childhood and adolescence. During the first decade of the 20th century, his style changed as he experimented with different theories, techniques, and ideas. After 1906, the Fauvist work of the older artist Henri Matisse motivated Picasso to explore more radical styles, beginning a fruitful rivalry between the two artists, who subsequently were often paired by critics as the leaders of modern art.

Picasso's output, especially in his early career, is often periodized. While the names of many of his later periods are debated, the most commonly accepted periods in his work are the Blue Period (1901–1904), the Rose Period (1904–1906), the African-influenced Period (1907–1909), Analytic Cubism (1909–1912), and Synthetic Cubism (1912–1919), also referred to as the Crystal period. Much of Picasso's work of the late 1910s and early 1920s is in a neoclassical style, and his work in the mid-1920s often has characteristics of Surrealism. His later work often combines elements of his earlier styles.

Exceptionally prolific throughout the course of his long life, Picasso achieved universal renown and immense fortune for his revolutionary artistic accomplishments, and became one of the best-known figures in 20th-century art.

== Early life ==
=== Childhood ===
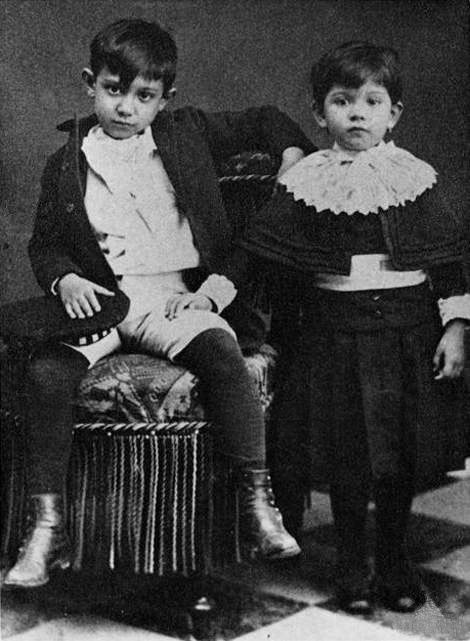
Picasso with his sister Lola, 1889

Pablo Ruiz Picasso was born at 23:15 on 25 October 1881 in the city of Málaga, Andalusia, in southern Spain. He was the first child of José Ruiz y Blasco (1838–1913) and María Picasso y López. Picasso's family was of middle-class background. His father was a painter who specialised in naturalistic depictions of birds and other game. For most of his life, Ruiz was a professor of art at the School of Crafts and a curator of a local museum.

Picasso's birth certificate and the record of his baptism include very long names, combining those of various saints and relatives (St. James, St. Joseph, St. Francis of Paola, St. John of Nepomuk, Mary of the Remedies, St. Cyprian, the Holy Trinity, Ruiz, y, Picasso). (Note: Though baptised a Catholic, Picasso would later become an atheist.) Ruiz y Picasso were his paternal and maternal surnames, respectively, per Spanish custom. The surname "Picasso" comes from Liguria, a coastal region of north-western Italy. Pablo's maternal great-grandfather, Tommaso Picasso, moved to Spain around 1807.

Picasso showed a passion and a skill for drawing from an early age. According to his mother, his first words were "piz, piz", a shortening of lápiz, the Spanish word for "pencil". From the age of seven, Picasso received formal artistic training from his father in figure drawing and oil painting. Ruiz was a traditional academic artist and instructor, who believed that proper training required disciplined copying of the masters, and drawing the human body from plaster casts and live models. His son became preoccupied with art to the detriment of his classwork.

The family moved to A Coruña in 1891, where his father became a professor at the School of Fine Arts. They stayed for almost four years. On one occasion, the father found his son painting over his unfinished sketch of a pigeon. Observing the precision of his son's technique, an apocryphal story relates, Ruiz felt that the thirteen-year-old Picasso had surpassed him, and vowed to give up painting, though paintings by him exist from later years.

In 1895, Picasso was traumatised when his seven-year-old sister, Conchita, died of diphtheria. After her death, the family moved to Barcelona, where Ruiz took a position at its School of Fine Arts. Picasso thrived in the city, regarding it in times of sadness or nostalgia as his true home. Ruiz persuaded the officials at the academy to allow his son to take an entrance exam for the advanced class. This process often took students a month, but Picasso completed it in a week, and the jury admitted him, at just 13. As a student, Picasso lacked discipline but made friendships that would affect him in later life. His father rented a small room for him close to home so he could work alone, yet he checked up on him numerous times a day, judging his drawings. The two argued frequently.

Picasso's father and uncle decided to send the young artist to Madrid's Real Academia de Bellas Artes de San Fernando, the country's foremost art school. At age 16, Picasso set off for the first time on his own, but he disliked formal instruction and stopped attending classes soon after enrolment. Madrid held many other attractions. The Prado housed paintings by Diego Velázquez, Francisco Goya, and Francisco de Zurbarán. Picasso especially admired the works of El Greco; elements such as his elongated limbs, arresting colours, and mystical visages are echoed in Picasso's later work.

== Career ==
=== Before 1900 ===
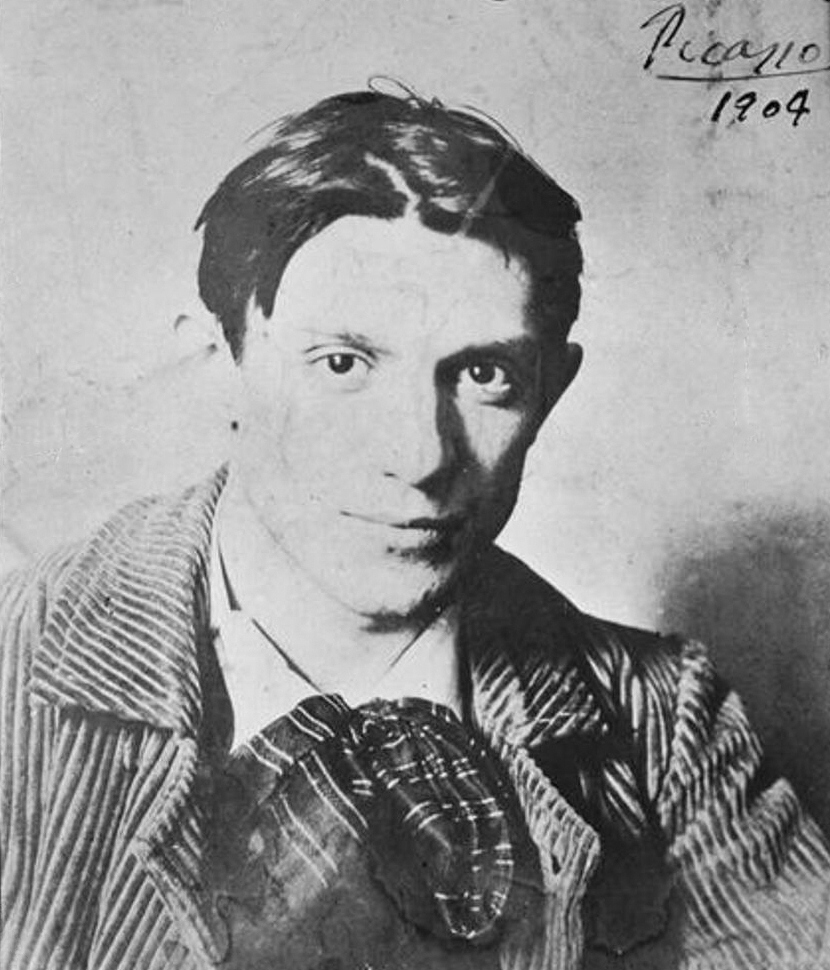
Picasso in 1904. Photograph by Ricard Canals

Picasso's training under his father began before 1890. His progress can be traced in the collection of early works now held by the Museu Picasso in Barcelona, which provides one of the most comprehensive extant records of any major artist's beginnings. During 1893 the juvenile quality of his earliest work falls away, and by 1894 his career as a painter can be said to have begun. The academic realism apparent in the works of the mid-1890s is well displayed in The First Communion (1896), a large composition that depicts his sister, Lola. In the same year, at the age of 14, he painted Portrait of Aunt Pepa, a vigorous and dramatic portrait that Juan-Eduardo Cirlot has called "without a doubt one of the greatest in the whole history of Spanish painting."

In 1897, his realism began to show a Symbolist influence, for example, in a series of landscape paintings rendered in non-naturalistic violet and green tones. What some call his Modernist period (1899–1900) followed. His exposure to the work of Rossetti, Steinlen, Toulouse-Lautrec and Edvard Munch, combined with his admiration for favourite old masters such as El Greco, led Picasso to a personal version of modernism in his works of this period.

Picasso made his first trip to Paris, then the art capital of Europe, in 1900. There, he met his first Parisian friend, journalist and poet Max Jacob, who helped Picasso learn the language and its literature. Soon they shared an apartment; Max slept at night while Picasso slept during the day and worked at night. These were times of severe poverty, cold, and desperation. Much of his work was burned to keep the small room warm. During the first five months of 1901, Picasso lived in Madrid, where he and his anarchist friend Francisco de Asís Soler founded the magazine Arte Joven (Young Art), which published five issues. Soler solicited articles and Picasso illustrated the journal, mostly contributing grim cartoons depicting and sympathising with the state of the poor. The first issue was published on 31 March 1901, by which time the artist had started to sign his work Picasso. From 1898 he signed his works as "Pablo Ruiz Picasso", then as "Pablo R. Picasso" until 1901. The change does not seem to imply a rejection of the father figure. Rather, he wanted to distinguish himself from others; initiated by his Catalan friends who habitually called him by his maternal surname, much less current than the paternal Ruiz.

=== Blue Period: 1901–1904 ===
La Vie (1903), Cleveland Museum of Art

The Old Guitarist (1903), Art Institute of Chicago

Picasso's Blue Period (1901–1904), characterised by sombre paintings rendered in shades of blue and blue-green only occasionally warmed by other colours, began either in Spain in early 1901 or in Paris in the second half of the year. Many paintings of gaunt mothers with children date from the Blue Period, during which Picasso divided his time between Barcelona and Paris. In his austere use of colour and sometimes doleful subject matter – prostitutes and beggars are frequent subjects – Picasso was influenced by a trip through Spain and by the suicide of his friend Carles Casagemas. Starting in autumn of 1901, he painted several posthumous portraits of Casagemas culminating in the gloomy allegorical painting La Vie (1903), now in the Cleveland Museum of Art.

The same mood pervades the well-known etching The Frugal Repast (1904), which depicts a blind man and a sighted woman, both emaciated, seated at a nearly bare table. Blindness, a recurrent theme in Picasso's works of this period, is also represented in The Blindman's Meal (1903, the Metropolitan Museum of Art) and in the portrait of Celestina (1903). Other Blue Period works include Portrait of Soler and Portrait of Suzanne Bloch.

=== Rose Period: 1904–1906 ===
Pablo Picasso, 1905, Au Lapin Agile (At the Lapin Agile) (Arlequin tenant un verre), oil on canvas, 99.1 × 100.3 cm, Metropolitan Museum of Art

The Rose Period (1904–1906) is characterised by a lighter tone and style utilising orange and pink colours and featuring many circus people, acrobats and harlequins known in France as saltimbanques. The harlequin, a comedic character usually depicted in chequered patterned clothing, became a personal symbol for Picasso. Picasso met Fernande Olivier, a bohemian artist who became his mistress, in Paris in 1904. Olivier appears in many of his Rose Period paintings, many of which are influenced by his warm relationship with her, in addition to his increased exposure to French painting. The generally upbeat and optimistic mood of paintings in this period is reminiscent of the 1899–1901 period (i.e., just prior to the Blue Period), and 1904 can be considered a transition year between the two periods.

Portrait of Gertrude Stein, 1906, Metropolitan Museum of Art, New York City. When someone commented that Stein did not look like her portrait, Picasso replied, "She will".

By 1905, Picasso became a favourite of American art collectors Leo and Gertrude Stein. Their older brother Michael Stein and his wife Sarah also became collectors of his work. Picasso painted a portrait of Gertrude Stein and one of her nephew Allan Stein. Gertrude Stein became Picasso's principal patron, acquiring his drawings and paintings and exhibiting them in her informal Salon at her home in Paris. At one of her gatherings in 1905, he met Henri Matisse, who was to become a lifelong friend and rival. The Steins introduced him to Claribel Cone and her sister Etta, who were American art collectors; they also began to acquire Picasso's and Matisse's paintings. Eventually, Leo Stein moved to Italy. Michael and Sarah Stein became patrons of Matisse, while Gertrude Stein continued to collect Picassos.

In 1907, Picasso joined an art gallery that had recently been opened in Paris by Daniel-Henry Kahnweiler, a German art historian and art collector who became one of the premier French art dealers of the 20th century. He was among the first champions of Pablo Picasso, Georges Braque and the Cubism that they jointly developed. Kahnweiler promoted burgeoning artists such as André Derain, Kees van Dongen, Fernand Léger, Juan Gris, Maurice de Vlaminck and several others who had come from all over the globe to live and work in Montparnasse at the time.

=== African art and primitivism: 1907–1909 ===
Les Demoiselles d'Avignon (1907), Museum of Modern Art, New York

Picasso's African-influenced Period (1907–1909) begins with his painting Les Demoiselles d'Avignon. The three figures on the left were inspired by Iberian sculpture, but he repainted the faces of the two figures on the right after being powerfully impressed by African artefacts he saw in June 1907 in the ethnographic museum at Palais du Trocadéro. When he displayed the painting to acquaintances in his studio later that year, the nearly universal reaction was shock and revulsion; Matisse angrily dismissed the work as a hoax. Picasso did not exhibit Les Demoiselles publicly until 1916.

Other works from this period include Nude with Raised Arms (1907) and Three Women (1908). Formal ideas developed during this period lead directly into the Cubist period that follows.

=== Cubism: 1909–1919 ===
==== Analytic cubism: 1909–1912 ====
Analytic cubism is a style of painting Picasso developed with Georges Braque using monochrome brownish and neutral colours. Both artists took apart objects and "analysed" them in terms of their shapes. Picasso and Braque's paintings at this time share many similarities.

In Paris, Picasso entertained a distinguished coterie of friends in the Montmartre and Montparnasse quarters, including André Breton, poet Guillaume Apollinaire, writer Alfred Jarry and Gertrude Stein. In 1911, Picasso was arrested and questioned about the theft of the Mona Lisa from the Louvre. Suspicion for the crime had initially fallen upon Apollinaire due to his links to Géry Pieret, an artist with a history of thefts from the gallery. Apollinaire in turn implicated his close friend Picasso, who had also purchased stolen artworks from the artist in the past. Afraid of a conviction that could result in his deportation to Spain, Picasso denied having ever met Apollinaire. Both were later cleared of any involvement in the painting's disappearance.

==== Synthetic cubism: 1912–1919 ====
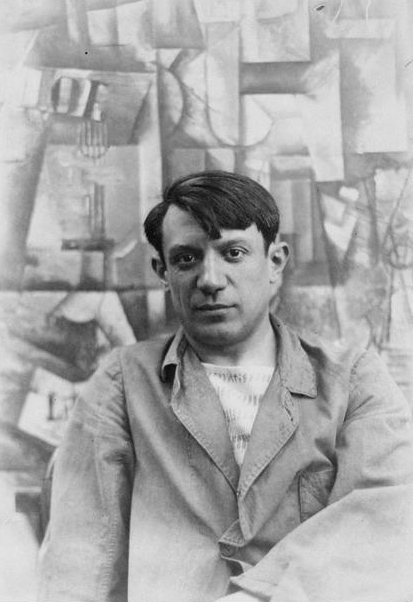
Picasso in front of his painting The Aficionado (Kunstmuseum Basel) at Villa les Clochettes, summer 1912

Synthetic cubism was a further development of the genre of cubism, in which cut paper fragments – often wallpaper or portions of newspaper pages – were pasted into compositions, marking the first cubist collage and simultaneously what is often considered to be the first assemblage, with his creation of the seminal work Still Life with Chair Caning (1912; oil and printed oilcloth on canvas edged with rope).

In 1912 Galerias Dalmau in Barcelona did two exhibitions side by side of Picasso and artist Joaquin Torres-Garcia.

Between 1915 and 1917, Picasso began a series of paintings depicting highly geometric and minimalist Cubist objects, consisting of either a pipe, a guitar or a glass, with an occasional element of collage. "Hard-edged square-cut diamonds", notes art historian John Richardson, "these gems do not always have upside or downside". "We need a new name to designate them," wrote Picasso to Gertrude Stein. The term "Crystal Cubism" was later used as a result of visual analogies with crystals at the time. These "little gems" may have been produced by Picasso in response to critics who had claimed his defection from the movement, through his experimentation with classicism within the so-called return to order following the war.

After acquiring some fame and fortune, Picasso left Olivier for Marcelle Humbert, also known as Eva Gouel. Picasso included declarations of his love for Eva in many Cubist works. Picasso was devastated by her premature death from illness at the age of 30 in 1915.

At the outbreak of World War I in August 1914, Picasso was living in Avignon. Braque and Derain were mobilised and Apollinaire joined the French artillery, while the Spaniard Juan Gris remained from the Cubist circle. During the war, Picasso was able to continue painting uninterrupted, unlike his French comrades. His paintings became more sombre and his life changed with dramatic consequences. Kahnweiler's contract had terminated on his exile from France. At this point, Picasso's work would be taken on by the art dealer Léonce Rosenberg. After the loss of Eva Gouel, Picasso had an affair with Gaby Lespinasse. During the spring of 1916, Apollinaire returned from the front wounded. They renewed their friendship, but Picasso began to frequent new social circles.

Costume design by Pablo Picasso representing skyscrapers and boulevards, for Serge Diaghilev's Ballets Russes performance of Parade at Théâtre du Châtelet, Paris 18 May 1917

Towards the end of World War I, Picasso became involved with Serge Diaghilev's Ballets Russes. Among his friends during this period were Jean Cocteau, Jean Hugo, Juan Gris, and others. In the summer of 1918, Picasso married Olga Khokhlova, a ballerina with Sergei Diaghilev's troupe, for whom Picasso was designing a ballet, Erik Satie's Parade, in Rome; they spent their honeymoon near Biarritz in the villa of glamorous Chilean art patron Eugenia Errázuriz.

Khokhlova introduced Picasso to high society, formal dinner parties, and other dimensions of the life of the rich in 1920s Paris. The two had a son, Paulo Picasso, who would grow up to be a motorcycle racer and chauffeur to his father. Khokhlova's insistence on social propriety clashed with Picasso's bohemian tendencies and the two lived in a state of constant conflict. During the same period that Picasso collaborated with Diaghilev's troupe, he and Igor Stravinsky collaborated on Pulcinella in 1920. Picasso took the opportunity to make several drawings of the composer. In the summer of 1921, Picasso, Khokhlova and Paulo stayed at a villa in the village of Fontainebleau, France; during their time there, Picasso, using the garage as a studio, painted Three Women at the Spring and Three Musicians.

1909, Femme assise (Sitzende Frau), oil on canvas, 100 × 80 cm (39 × 31 in), Staatliche Museen, Neue Nationalgalerie, Berlin

1909–10, Figure dans un Fauteuil (Seated Nude, Femme nue assise), oil on canvas, 92.1 × 73 cm (36 × 28 in), Tate Modern, London. This painting from the collection of Wilhelm Uhde was confiscated by the French state and sold at the Hôtel Drouot in 1921.

1910, Woman with Mustard Pot (La Femme au pot de moutarde), oil on canvas, 73 × 60 cm (28 × 23 in), Gemeentemuseum, The Hague. Exhibited at the Armory Show, New York, Chicago, Boston 1913

1910, Girl with a Mandolin (Fanny Tellier), oil on canvas, 100.3 × 73.6 cm (39 × 28 in), Museum of Modern Art, New York

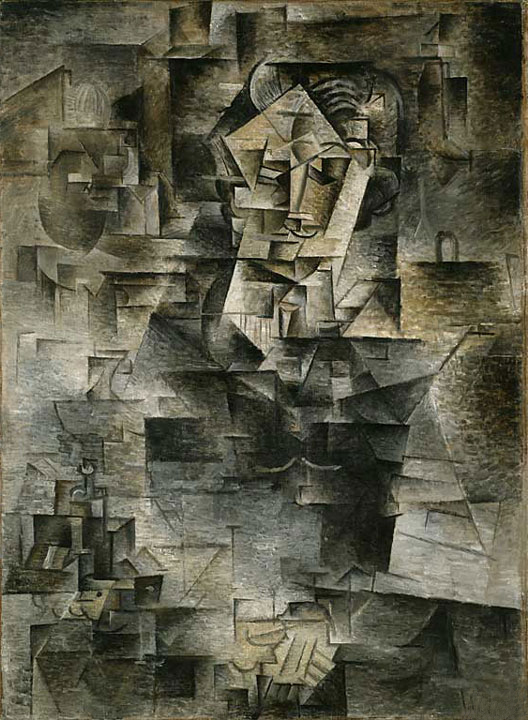
1910, Portrait of Daniel-Henry Kahnweiler, The Art Institute of Chicago. Picasso wrote of Kahnweiler "What would have become of us if Kahnweiler hadn't had a business sense?"

1910–11, Guitariste, La mandoliniste (Woman playing guitar or mandolin), oil on canvas

c. 1911, Le Guitariste. Reproduced in Albert Gleizes and Jean Metzinger, Du "Cubisme", 1912

1911, Still Life with a Bottle of Rum, oil on canvas, 61.3 × 50.5 cm (24 × 19 in), Metropolitan Museum of Art, New York

1911, The Poet (Le poète), oil on linen, 131.2 × 89.5 cm (51 5/8 × 35 1/4 in), The Solomon R. Guggenheim Foundation, Peggy Guggenheim Collection, Venice

1911–12, Violon (Violin), oil on canvas, 100 × 73 cm (39 × 28 in) (oval), Kröller-Müller Museum, Otterlo, Netherlands. This painting from the collection of Wilhelm Uhde was confiscated by the French state and sold at the Hôtel Drouot in 1921.

1913, Bouteille, clarinet, violon, journal, verre, 55 × 45 cm (21 × 17 in). This painting from the collection of Wilhelm Uhde was confiscated by the French state and sold at the Hôtel Drouot in 1921.

1913, Femme assise dans un fauteuil (Eva), Woman in a Chemise in an Armchair, oil on canvas, 149.9 × 99.4 cm (59 × 39 in), Leonard A. Lauder Cubist Collection, Metropolitan Museum of Art

1913–14, Head (Tête), cut and pasted coloured paper, gouache and charcoal on paperboard, 43.5 × 33 cm (17 × 12.9 in), Scottish National Gallery of Modern Art, Edinburgh

1913–14, L'Homme aux cartes (Card Player), oil on canvas, 108 × 89.5 cm (42 × 35 in), Museum of Modern Art, New York

1914–15, Nature morte au compotier (Still Life with Compote and Glass), oil on canvas, 63.5 × 78.7 cm (25 × 31 in), Columbus Museum of Art, Ohio

1916, L'anis del mono (Bottle of Anis del Mono), oil on canvas, 46 × 54.6 cm (18 × 21 in), Detroit Institute of Arts, Michigan

Parade, 1917, curtain designed for the ballet Parade. The work is the largest of Picasso's paintings. Centre Pompidou-Metz, Metz, France, May 2012

=== Neoclassicism and surrealism: 1919–1929 ===
Pablo Picasso, 1921, Nu assis s'essuyant le pied (Seated Nude Drying her Foot), pastel, 66 × 50.8 cm, Berggruen Museum

In February 1917, Picasso made his first trip to Italy. In the period following the upheaval of World War I, Picasso produced work in a neoclassical style. This "return to order" is evident in the work of many European artists in the 1920s, including André Derain, Giorgio de Chirico, Gino Severini, Jean Metzinger, the artists of the New Objectivity movement and of the Novecento Italiano movement. Picasso's paintings and drawings from this period frequently recall the work of Raphael and Ingres.

In 1925 the Surrealist writer and poet André Breton declared Picasso as "one of ours" in his article Le Surréalisme et la peinture, published in Révolution surréaliste. Les Demoiselles was reproduced for the first time in Europe in the same issue. Yet Picasso exhibited Cubist works at the first Surrealist group exhibition in 1925; the concept of "psychic automatism in its pure state" defined in the Manifeste du surréalisme never appealed to him entirely. He did at the time develop new imagery and formal syntax for expressing himself emotionally, "releasing the violence, the psychic fears and the eroticism that had been largely contained or sublimated since 1909", writes art historian Melissa McQuillan. Although this transition in Picasso's work was informed by Cubism for its spatial relations, "the fusion of ritual and abandon in the imagery recalls the primitivism of the Demoiselles and the elusive psychological resonances of his Symbolist work", writes McQuillan. Surrealism revived Picasso's attraction to primitivism and eroticism.

In 1927, Picasso met 17-year-old Marie-Thérèse Walter and began a long-standing affair with her. She became his "Golden muse," and he fathered a daughter with her, named Maya.

Pablo Picasso, 1918, Pierrot, oil on canvas, 92.7 × 73 cm, Museum of Modern Art, New York

Pablo Picasso, 1918, Portrait d'Olga dans un fauteuil (Olga in an Armchair), Musée Picasso, Paris, France

Pablo Picasso, 1919, Sleeping Peasants, gouache, watercolour and pencil on paper, 31.1 × 48.9 cm, Museum of Modern Art

=== The Great Depression, Guernica, and the MoMA exhibition: 1930–1939 ===
During the 1930s, the minotaur replaced the harlequin as a common motif in his work. His use of the minotaur came partly from his contact with the surrealists, who often used it as their symbol, and it appears in Picasso's Guernica. The minotaur and Picasso's mistress Marie-Thérèse Walter are heavily featured in his celebrated Vollard Suite of etchings.

Arguably Picasso's most famous work is his depiction of the German bombing of Guernica during the Spanish Civil War – Guernica. This large canvas embodies for many the inhumanity, brutality and hopelessness of war. Asked to explain its symbolism, Picasso said, "It isn't up to the painter to define the symbols. Otherwise it would be better if he wrote them out in so many words! The public who look at the picture must interpret the symbols as they understand them."

Guernica was exhibited in July 1937 at the Spanish Pavilion at the Paris International Exposition, and then became the centrepiece of an exhibition of 118 works by Picasso, Matisse, Braque and Henri Laurens that toured Scandinavia and England. After the victory of Francisco Franco in Spain, the painting was sent to the United States to raise funds and support for Spanish refugees. Until 1981 it was entrusted to the Museum of Modern Art (MoMA) in New York City, as it was Picasso's expressed desire that the painting should not be delivered to Spain until liberty and democracy had been established in the country.

Before Guernica, Picasso had never addressed political themes in his art. The politicised nature of the work is largely attributed to his romantic relationship at the time with the French anti-fascist activist and surrealist photographer, Dora Maar. In addition, her black and white photographs are likely to have influenced the black and white scheme of Guernica, in stark contrast to Picasso's usual colourful paintings. "Maar's practice of photography influenced the art of Picasso – she had a great influence on his work," said Antoine Romand, a Dora Maar expert. "She contested him. She pushed him to do something new and to be more creative politically." Maar had exclusive access to Picasso's studio to observe and photograph the creation of Guernica. At Picasso's request, Maar painted parts of the dying horse.

In 1939 and 1940, the Museum of Modern Art in New York City, under its director Alfred Barr, a Picasso enthusiast, held a major retrospective of Picasso's principal works until that time. This exhibition lionised Picasso, brought into full public view in America the scope of his artistry, and resulted in a reinterpretation of his work by contemporary art historians and scholars. According to Jonathan Weinberg, "Given the extraordinary quality of the show and Picasso's enormous prestige, generally heightened by the political impact of Guernica ... the critics were surprisingly ambivalent". Picasso's "multiplicity of styles" was disturbing to one journalist; another described him as "wayward and even malicious"; Alfred Frankenstein's review in ARTnews concluded that Picasso was both charlatan and genius.

=== World War II and late 1940s: 1939–1949 ===
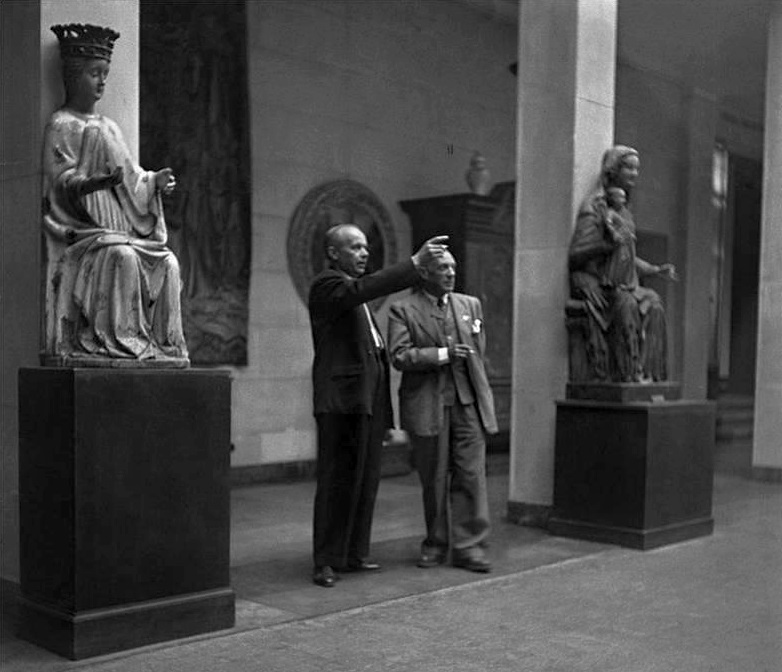
Stanisław Lorentz guides Picasso through the National Museum in Warsaw in Poland during the exhibition Contemporary French Painters and Pablo Picasso's Ceramics, 1948. Picasso gave Warsaw's museum over a dozen of his ceramics, drawings, and colour prints.

Scene from the Degenerate art auction, spring 1938, published in a Swiss newspaper. Works by Picasso, Head of a Woman (lot 117), Two Harlequins (lot 115).

During World War II, Picasso remained in Paris while the Germans occupied the city. Picasso's artistic style did not fit the Nazi ideal of art, so he did not exhibit during this time. He confused Germans who came to steal both his and Matisse's paintings from a bank vault, disparaging the value of his work and distracting them from a more thorough search, thus protecting their collections. He was often harassed by the Gestapo. During one search of his apartment, an officer saw a photograph of the painting Guernica. "Did you do that?" the German asked Picasso. "No," he replied, "You did."

Retreating to his studio, he continued to paint, producing works such as the Still Life with Guitar (1942) and The Charnel House (1944–48). Although the Germans outlawed bronze casting in Paris, Picasso continued regardless, using bronze smuggled to him by the French Resistance.

Around this time, Picasso wrote poetry as an alternative outlet. Between 1935 and 1959 he wrote more than 300 poems. Largely untitled except for a date and sometimes the location of where they were written (for example "Paris 16 May 1936"), these works were gustatory, erotic, and at times scatological, as were his two full-length plays, Desire Caught by the Tail (1941), The Four Little Girls (1949) and The Burial of the Count of Orgaz (1959).

In 1944, after the liberation of Paris, Picasso, then 63 years old, began a romantic relationship with a young art student named Françoise Gilot. She was 40 years younger than he was. Picasso grew tired of his mistress Dora Maar; Picasso and Gilot began to live together. Eventually, they had two children: Claude Picasso, born in 1947 and Paloma Picasso, born in 1949.

Picasso photographed in 1953 by Paolo Monti during an exhibition at Palazzo Reale in Milan (Fondo Paolo Monti, BEIC)

Picasso had affairs with women of an even greater age disparity than his and Gilot's. While still involved with Gilot, in 1951 Picasso had a six-week affair with Geneviève Laporte, who was four years younger than Gilot. By his 70s, many paintings, ink drawings and prints have as their theme an old, grotesque dwarf as the doting lover of a beautiful young model.

=== Later works and final years: 1949–1973 ===
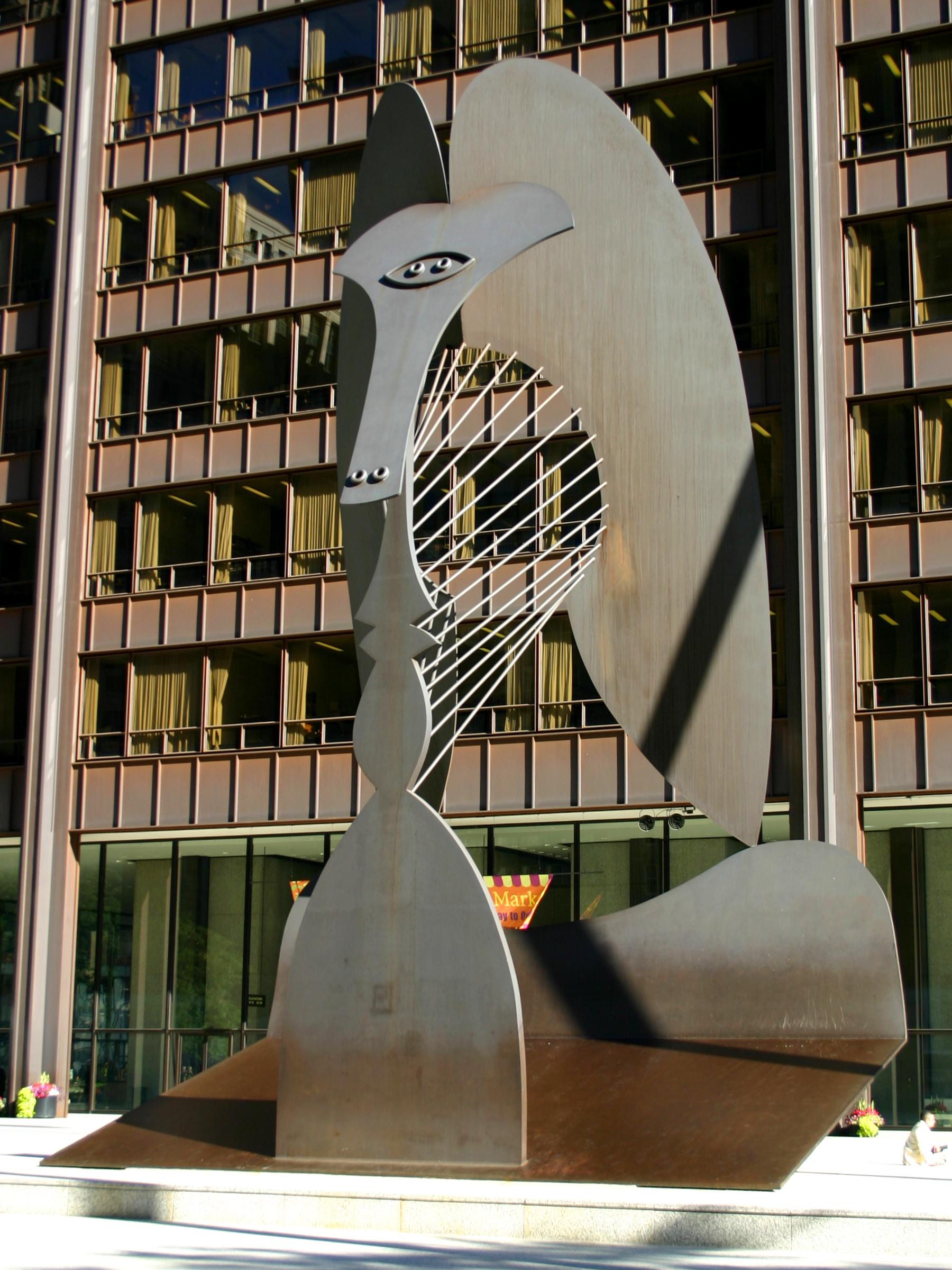
The Chicago Picasso, a 50-foot-high (15 m) public Cubist sculpture. Donated by Picasso to the people of Chicago in 1967.

Picasso was one of 250 sculptors who exhibited in the 3rd Sculpture International held at the Philadelphia Museum of Art in mid-1949. In the 1950s, Picasso's style changed once again, as he took to producing reinterpretations of the art of the great masters. He made a series of works based on Velázquez's painting Las Meninas. He also based paintings on works by Goya, Poussin, Manet, Courbet and Delacroix.

By this time, Picasso had constructed a huge Gothic home, and could afford large villas in the south of France, such as Mas Notre-Dame-de-Vie on the outskirts of Mougins, and in the Provence-Alpes-Côte d'Azur. He was an international celebrity, with often as much interest in his personal life as his art. He maintained a critical scepticism toward the younger generation of postwar French painters; in 1957, he dismissively characterized the work of celebrity figurative painter Bernard Buffet as "zero" to mutual friend Jean Cocteau, having witnessed his young children Claude and Paloma ask Buffet for autographs at a Cannes restaurant.

In 1952, Picasso met Jacqueline Roque, who worked at the Madoura Pottery in Vallauris on the French Riviera, where Picasso made and painted ceramics. She became his lover, and then his second wife in 1961. The two were together for the remainder of Picasso's life.

In addition to his artistic accomplishments, Picasso made a few film appearances, always as himself, including a cameo in Jean Cocteau's Testament of Orpheus (1960). In 1955, he helped make the film Le Mystère Picasso (The Mystery of Picasso) directed by Henri-Georges Clouzot.

He was commissioned to make a maquette for a huge 50-foot-high (15 m) public sculpture to be built in Chicago, known usually as the Chicago Picasso. He approached the project with a great deal of enthusiasm, designing a sculpture which was ambiguous and somewhat controversial. Picasso said the figure represented the head of an Afghan Hound named Kabul. The sculpture, one of the most recognisable landmarks in downtown Chicago, was unveiled in 1967. Picasso refused to be paid $100,000 for it, donating it to the people of the city.

Picasso's final works were a mixture of styles, his means of expression in constant flux until the end of his life. Devoting his full energies to his work, Picasso became more daring, his works more colourful and expressive, and from 1968 to 1971 he produced a torrent of paintings and hundreds of copperplate etchings. At the time these works were dismissed by most as pornographic fantasies of an impotent old man or the slapdash works of an artist who was past his prime. Only later, after Picasso's death, when the rest of the art world had moved on from abstract expressionism, did the critical community come to see the late works of Picasso as prefiguring Neo-Expressionism.

In the spring of 1973, Picasso assisted in putting together 201 of his paintings for the Avignon Arts Festival, which opened at the Palais des Papes in May of that year. The canvases, according to Paul Puaux, the festival director who had visited Picasso at his home, represented the artist's work from October 1970 until the end of 1972.

== Death ==
Picasso died on 8 April 1973 in Mougins, France, from a heart attack brought on by pulmonary edema. The evening before his death, Picasso and his wife Jacqueline entertained friends for dinner. He painted until 3 a.m. on this particular night before going to bed. Picasso woke up at 11:30 a.m., but he was unable to get out of bed. Jacqueline called his physician, Dr. Jean-Claude Rance, for assistance, but he died at 11:40 a.m. before a doctor arrived.

Picasso was interred at the Château of Vauvenargues near Aix-en-Provence, a property he had acquired in 1958 and occupied with Jacqueline between 1959 and 1961. Jacqueline prevented Picasso's children Maya, Claude, and Paloma, and his grandson Pablito from seeing his body. Only Paulo, the sole legitimate child of Picasso, was allowed to attend the funeral.

Picasso died without a will, which led to a feud over his estate. His three illegitimate children were granted the right to share the Picasso estate by French judges, despite opposition from Jacqueline and Paulo. Following the death of Paulo in 1975, Picasso's surviving heirs were his widow, Jacqueline; his grandchildren from Paulo, Marina and Bernard; and his children, Claude, Paloma and Maya. They reached a settlement on how to divide Picasso's $240 million estate in December 1976.

== Works ==
=== Style and technique ===
Pablo Picasso, 1901, Old Woman (Woman with Gloves), oil on cardboard, 67 × 52.1 cm, Philadelphia Museum of Art

Pablo Picasso, 1901–02, Femme au café (Absinthe Drinker), oil on canvas, 73 × 54 cm, Hermitage Museum

Picasso was exceptionally prolific throughout his long lifetime. At his death there were more than 45,000 unsold works in his estate, comprising 1,885 paintings, 1,228 sculptures, 3,222 ceramics, 7,089 drawings, 150 sketchbooks, many thousands of prints, and numerous tapestries and rugs. The most complete – but not exhaustive – catalogue of his works, the catalogue raisonné compiled by Christian Zervos, lists more than 16,000 paintings and drawings. Picasso's output was several times more prolific than most artists of his era; by at least one account, American artist Bob Ross is the only one to rival Picasso's volume, and Ross's artwork was designed specifically to be easily mass-produced quickly.

The medium in which Picasso made his most important contribution was painting. In his paintings, Picasso used colour as an expressive element, but relied on drawing rather than subtleties of colour to create form and space. He sometimes added sand to his paint to vary its texture. A nanoprobe of Picasso's The Red Armchair (1931), in the collection of the Art Institute of Chicago, by physicists at Argonne National Laboratory in 2012 confirmed art historians' belief that Picasso used common house paint in many of his paintings. Much of his painting was done at night by artificial light.

Picasso's early sculptures were carved from wood or modelled in wax or clay, but from 1909 to 1928 Picasso abandoned modelling and instead made sculptural constructions using diverse materials. An example is Guitar (1912), a relief construction made of sheet metal and wire that Jane Fluegel terms a "three-dimensional planar counterpart of Cubist painting" that marks a "revolutionary departure from the traditional approaches, modeling and carving".

Pablo Picasso, 1921, Three Musicians, oil on canvas, 200.7 × 222.9 cm, Museum of Modern Art, New York. Mrs. Simon Guggenheim Fund

From the beginning of his career, Picasso displayed an interest in subject matter of every kind, and demonstrated a great stylistic versatility that enabled him to work in several styles at once. For example, his paintings of 1917 included the pointillist Woman with a Mantilla, the Cubist Figure in an Armchair, and the naturalistic Harlequin (all in the Museu Picasso, Barcelona). In 1919, he made a number of drawings from postcards and photographs that reflect his interest in the stylistic conventions and static character of posed photographs. In 1921 he simultaneously painted several large neoclassical paintings and two versions of the Cubist composition Three Musicians (Museum of Modern Art, New York; Philadelphia Museum of Art). In an interview published in 1923, Picasso said, "The several manners I have used in my art must not be considered as an evolution, or as steps towards an unknown ideal of painting ... If the subjects I have wanted to express have suggested different ways of expression I have never hesitated to adopt them."

Although his Cubist works approach abstraction, Picasso never relinquished the objects of the real world as subject matter. Prominent in his Cubist paintings are forms easily recognised as guitars, violins, and bottles. When Picasso depicted complex narrative scenes it was usually in prints, drawings, and small-scale works; Guernica (1937) is one of his few large narrative paintings. Guernica was on display at the Museum of Modern Art for many years. In 1981, it was returned to Spain and was on exhibit at the Casón del Buen Retiro of the Museo del Prado. In 1992, the painting was put on display in the Reina Sofía Museum when it opened.

Picasso painted mostly from imagination or memory. According to William Rubin, Picasso "could only make great art from subjects that truly involved him ... Unlike Matisse, Picasso had eschewed models virtually all his mature life, preferring to paint individuals whose lives had both impinged on, and had real significance for, his own." The art critic Arthur Danto said Picasso's work constitutes a "vast pictorial autobiography" that provides some basis for the popular conception that "Picasso invented a new style each time he fell in love with a new woman". The autobiographical nature of Picasso's art is reinforced by his habit of dating his works, often to the day. He explained: "I want to leave to posterity a documentation that will be as complete as possible. That's why I put a date on everything I do."

The women in Picasso's life played an important role in the emotional and erotic aspects of his creative expression, and the tumultuous nature of these relationships has been considered vital to his artistic process. Many of these women functioned as muses for him, and their inclusion in his extensive oeuvre granted them a place in art history. A largely recurring motif in his body of work is the female form. The variations in his relationships informed and collided with his progression of style throughout his career. For example, portraits created of his first wife, Olga, were rendered in a naturalistic style during his Neoclassical period. His relationship with Marie-Thérèse Walter inspired many of his surrealist pieces, as well as what is referred to as his "Year of Wonders". The reappearance of an acrobats theme in 1905 put an end to his "Blue Period", marking the transition into his "Rose Period". This transition has been incorrectly attributed to the presence of Fernande Olivier in his life.

=== Catalogue raisonné ===
Picasso entrusted Christian Zervos to constitute the catalogue raisonné of his work (painted and drawn). The first volume of the catalogue, Works from 1895 to 1906, published in 1932, entailed the financial ruin of Zervos, self-publishing under the name Cahiers d'art, forcing him to sell part of his art collection at auction to avoid bankruptcy.

From 1932 to 1978, Zervos constituted the catalogue raisonné of the complete works of Picasso in the company of the artist who had become one of his friends in 1924. Following the death of Zervos, Mila Gagarin supervised the publication of 11 additional volumes from 1970 to 1978.

The 33 volumes cover the entire work from 1895 to 1972, with close to 16,000 black and white photographs, in accord with the will of the artist.

- 1932: tome I, Œuvres de 1895 à 1906. Introduction p. XI–[XXXXIX], 185 pages, 384 reproductions
- 1942: tome II, vol.1, Œuvres de 1906 à 1912. Introduction p. XI–[LV], 172 pages, 360 reproductions
- 1944: tome II, vol.2, Œuvres de 1912 à 1917. Introduction p. IX–[LXX–VIII], 233 p. pp. 173 to 406, 604 reproductions
- 1949: tome III, Œuvres de 1917 à 1919. Introduction p. IX–[XIII], 152 pages, 465 reproductions
- 1951: tome IV, Œuvres de 1920 à 1922. Introduction p. VII–[XIV], 192 pages, 455 reproductions
- 1952: tome V, Œuvres de 1923 à 1925. Introduction p. IX–[XIV], 188 pages, 466 reproductions
- 1954: tome VI, Supplément aux tomes I à V. Sans introduction, 176 pages, 1481 reproductions
- 1955: tome VII, Œuvres de 1926 à 1932. Introduction p. V–[VII], 184 pages, 424 reproductions
- 1978: Catalogue raisonné des œuvres de Pablo Picasso, Paris, Éditions Cahiers d'art

Further publications by Zervos

- Picasso. Œuvres de 1920 à 1926, Cahiers d'art, Paris
- Dessins de Picasso 1892–1948, Paris, Éditions Cahiers d'art, 1949
- Picasso. Dessins (1892–1948), Hazan, 199 reproductions, 1949

== Personal life ==
Picasso has been characterised as a womaniser and a misogynist, being quoted as saying to his longtime partner Françoise Gilot that "women are machines for suffering." He later allegedly told her, "For me there are only two kinds of women: goddesses and doormats." In her memoir, Picasso, My Grandfather, Marina Picasso writes of his treatment of women, "He submitted them to his animal sexuality, tamed them, bewitched them, ingested them, and crushed them onto his canvas. After he had spent many nights extracting their essence, once they were bled dry, he would dispose of them."

From early adolescence, Picasso maintained both superficial and intense amatory sexual relationships. Biographer John Richardson stated that 'work, sex, and tobacco' were his addictions. Picasso was married twice and had four children with three women:

- Paulo Picasso (4 February 1921 – 5 June 1975, Paul Joseph Picasso) – his son with Olga Khokhlova

Paulo had 3 children: Pablito Picasso (5 May 1949 – 12 July 1973); Marina Picasso (b. 14 November 1950); Bernard Ruiz-Picasso (b. 3 September 1959)

- Maya (5 September 1935 – 20 December 2022, Maria de la Concepcion Picasso) – his daughter with Marie-Thérèse Walter

Maya had 3 children: Olivier Widmaier Picasso (b. 4 June 1961); Richard Widmaier Picasso (b. 1966); Diana Widmaier Picasso (b. 12 March 1974)

- Claude (15 May 1947 – 24 August 2023, Claude Ruiz Picasso) – his son with Françoise Gilot

Claude had 1 child: Jasmin Picasso (b. 1981)

- Paloma (born 19 April 1949, Anne Paloma Picasso) – his daughter with Françoise Gilot

Picasso married ballet dancer Olga Khokhlova in 1918. In 1935, Picasso began divorce proceedings, but Khokhlova refused to divorce. They legally separated in 1941, but remained married until Khokhlova's death in 1955.

When Picasso's mistress Marie-Thérèse Walter gave birth to their daughter Maya in 1935, he secretly placed them in an apartment at 44 rue de La Boétie in the 8th arrondissement, which was across from his residence with his wife Olga at number 23. In 1937, Marie-Thérèse and Maya were sent to Le Tremblay-sur-Mauldre. Maya was 10 years old when she learned that she had an older brother, Paulo.

Photographer and painter Dora Maar was a constant companion and lover of Picasso. The two were closest in the late 1930s and early 1940s, and it was Maar who documented the painting of Guernica.

In December 1961, Picasso's children with artist Françoise Gilot, Claude and Paloma, were granted full legal rights to use the name Picasso after their father legally recognised his paternity in a written statement submitted to a French court. However, ten years later, Picasso successfully contested a legal case in which he refused to acknowledge paternity. Three weeks following the 1961 court case, newspapers revealed his second marriage to Jacqueline Roque, a salesgirl at a pottery store. In her 1964 book Life with Picasso, Gilot describes his abusive treatment and myriad infidelities which led her to leave him, taking the children with her in 1953. The book angered Picasso and he severed ties with his children. His strained relationship with Claude and Paloma was never healed. Gilot later stated in an interview with The Times:

He was astonishingly creative, so intelligent and seductive. If he was in the mood to charm, even stones would dance to his tune. But he was also cruel, sadistic and merciless to others as well as to himself. Everything had to be his way. You were there for him; he was not there for you. Pablo thought he was God, but he was not God — and that annoyed him! ... Pablo was the greatest love of my life, but you had to take steps to protect yourself. I did. I left before I was destroyed. The others didn't, they clung on to the mighty Minotaur and paid a heavy price.

Of the several important women in his life, two of them – his lover Marie-Thèrése Walter and his second wife Jacqueline Roque – died by suicide (four and thirteen years after his death, respectively). Others, notably his first wife Olga Khokhlova and lover Dora Maar, succumbed to nervous breakdowns. His grandson, Pablito, killed himself by ingesting bleach when he was barred by Picasso's widow, Jacqueline, from attending the artist's funeral in 1973. His son, Paulo, died from alcoholism due to depression in 1975. Devastated and lonely after the death of Picasso, Jacqueline fatally shot herself in 1986.

== Political views ==
Picasso remained aloof from the Catalan independence movement during his youth, despite expressing general support and being friendly with activists within it. He did not join the armed forces for any side or country during World War I, the Spanish Civil War, or World War II. As a Spanish citizen living in France, Picasso was under no compulsion to fight against the invading Germans in either world war. In 1940, he applied for French citizenship, but it was refused on the grounds of his "extremist ideas evolving towards communism". This information was not revealed until 2003.

At the start of the Spanish Civil War in 1936, Picasso was 54 years of age. Soon after hostilities began, the Republicans appointed him "director of the Prado, albeit in absentia", and "he took his duties very seriously", according to John Richardson, supplying the funds to evacuate the museum's collection to Geneva. The war provided the impetus for Picasso's first overtly political work. He expressed anger and condemnation of Francisco Franco and fascists in The Dream and Lie of Franco (1937), which was produced "specifically for propagandistic and fundraising purposes". This surreal fusion of words and images was intended to be sold as a series of postcards to raise funds for the Spanish Republican cause.

In 1944, Picasso joined the French Communist Party. He attended the 1948 World Congress of Intellectuals in Defense of Peace in Poland, and in 1950 received the Stalin Peace Prize from the Soviet government. A portrait of Joseph Stalin made by Picasso in 1953 drew Party criticism due to being insufficiently realistic, though he remained a loyal member of the Communist Party until his death. His dealer, D-H. Kahnweiler, a socialist, termed Picasso's communism "sentimental" rather than political, saying "He has never read a line of Karl Marx, nor of Engels of course." In a 1945 interview with Jerome Seckler, Picasso stated: "I am a Communist and my painting is Communist painting. ... But if I were a shoemaker, Royalist or Communist or anything else, I would not necessarily hammer my shoes in a special way to show my politics." His commitment to communism, common among continental intellectuals and artists at the time, has long been the subject of some controversy; a notable demonstration thereof was a quote by Salvador Dalí (with whom Picasso had a rather strained relationship):

Picasso es pintor, yo también; ... Picasso es español, yo también; Picasso es comunista, yo tampoco.

(Picasso is a painter, so am I; ... Picasso is a Spaniard, so am I; Picasso is a communist, neither am I.)

In the late 1940s, his old friend surrealist poet André Breton, who was a Trotskyist and anti-Stalinist, was more blunt; refusing to shake hands with Picasso, he told him: "I don't approve of your joining the Communist Party nor with the stand you have taken concerning the purges of the intellectuals after the Liberation." As a communist, Picasso opposed the intervention of the United Nations and the United States in the Korean War, and depicted it in Massacre in Korea. The art critic Kirsten Hoving Keen wrote that it was "inspired by reports of American atrocities" and considered it one of Picasso's communist works.

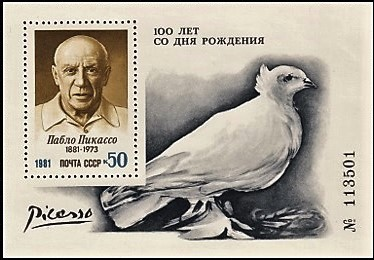
Picasso's Dove on a Soviet stamp from 1981

On 9 January 1949, Picasso created Dove, a black and white lithograph. It was used to illustrate a poster at the 1949 World Peace Council and became an iconographic image of the period, known as "The dove of peace". Picasso's image was used around the world as a symbol of the Peace Congresses and communism.

In 1962, he received the Lenin Peace Prize. Biographer and art critic John Berger felt his talents as an artist were "wasted" by the communists. According to Jean Cocteau's diaries, Picasso once said to him in reference to the communists: "I have joined a family, and like all families, it's full of shit."

== Legacy ==
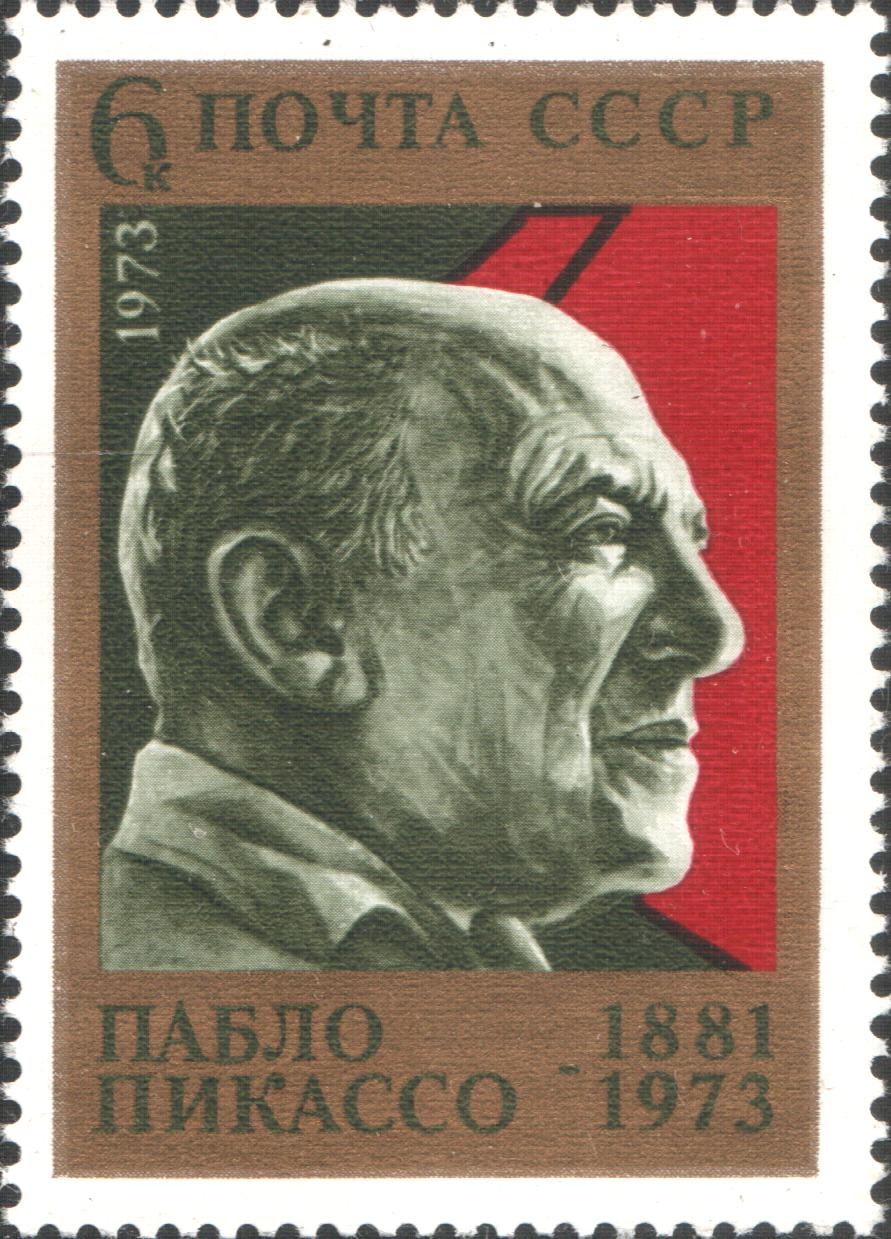
Postage stamp, USSR, 1973. Picasso has been honoured on stamps worldwide.

Picasso's influence was and remains immense and widely acknowledged by his admirers and detractors alike. On the occasion of his 1939 retrospective at New York's Museum of Modern Art, Life magazine wrote: "During the 25 years he has dominated modern European art, his enemies say he has been a corrupting influence. With equal violence, his friends say he is the greatest artist alive." In 1971, Picasso was the first living artist to receive a special honour exhibition at the Grand Gallery of the Louvre Museum in Paris in celebration of his 90th birthday. In 1998, Robert Hughes wrote of him: "To say that Pablo Picasso dominated Western art in the 20th century is, by now, the merest commonplace. ... No painter or sculptor, not even Michelangelo, had been as famous as this in his own lifetime. ... Though Marcel Duchamp, that cunning old fox of conceptual irony, has certainly had more influence on nominally vanguard art over the past 30 years than Picasso, the Spaniard was the last great beneficiary of the belief that the language of painting and sculpture really mattered to people other than their devotees."

=== The Basel vote ===
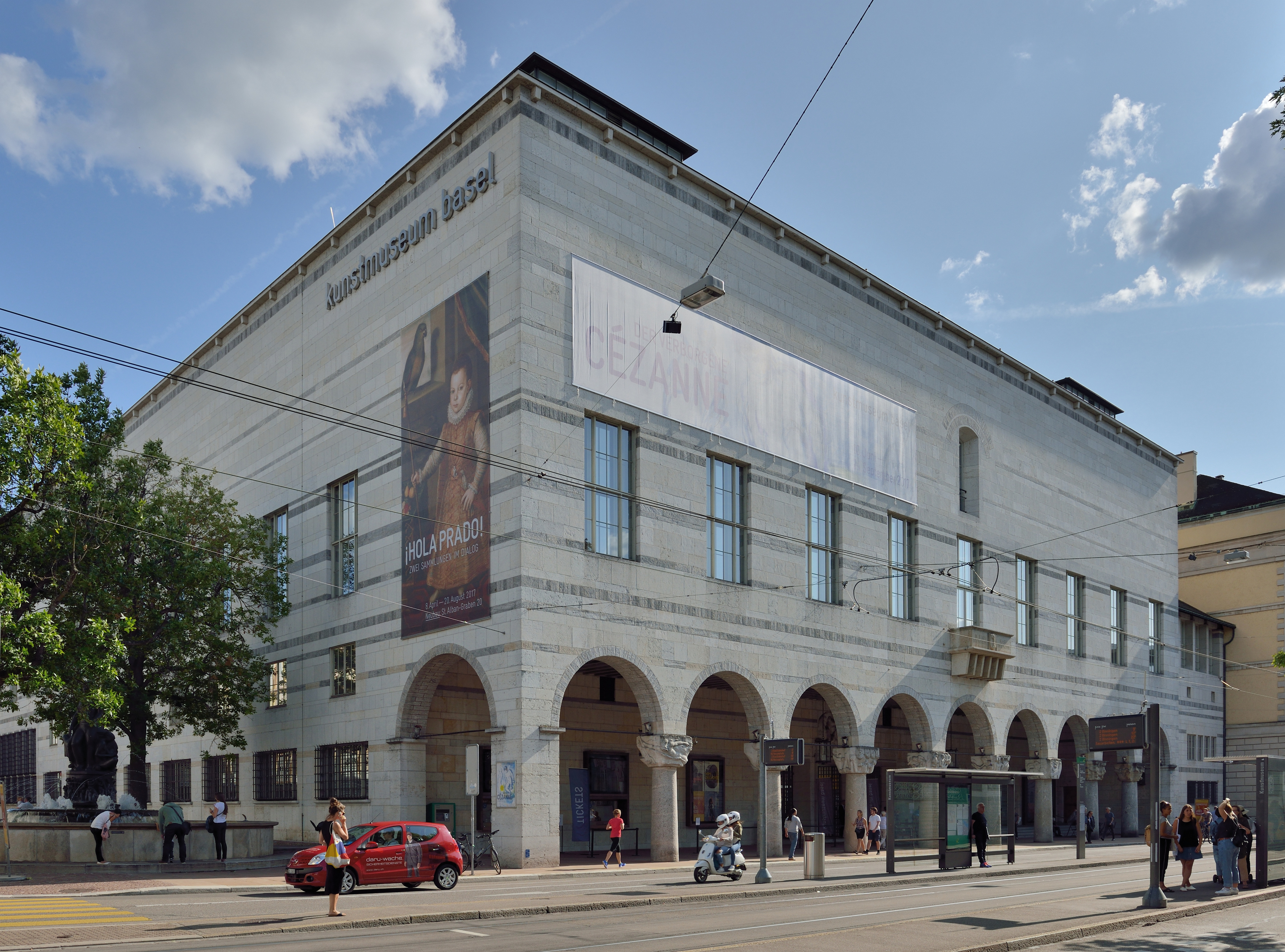
The Kunstmuseum Basel

In the 1940s, a Swiss insurance company based in Basel had bought two paintings by Picasso to diversify its investments and serve as a guarantee for the insured risks. Following an air disaster in 1967, the company had to pay out heavy reimbursements. The company decided to part with the two paintings, which were deposited in the Kunstmuseum Basel. In 1968, a large number of Basel citizens called for a local referendum on the purchase of the Picassos by the Canton of Basel-Stadt, which was successful, making it the first time in democratic history that the population of a city voted on the purchase of works of art for a public art museum. The paintings therefore remained in the museum in Basel. Informed of this, Picasso donated three paintings and a sketch to the city and its museum and was later made an honorary citizen by the city.

=== Museums ===
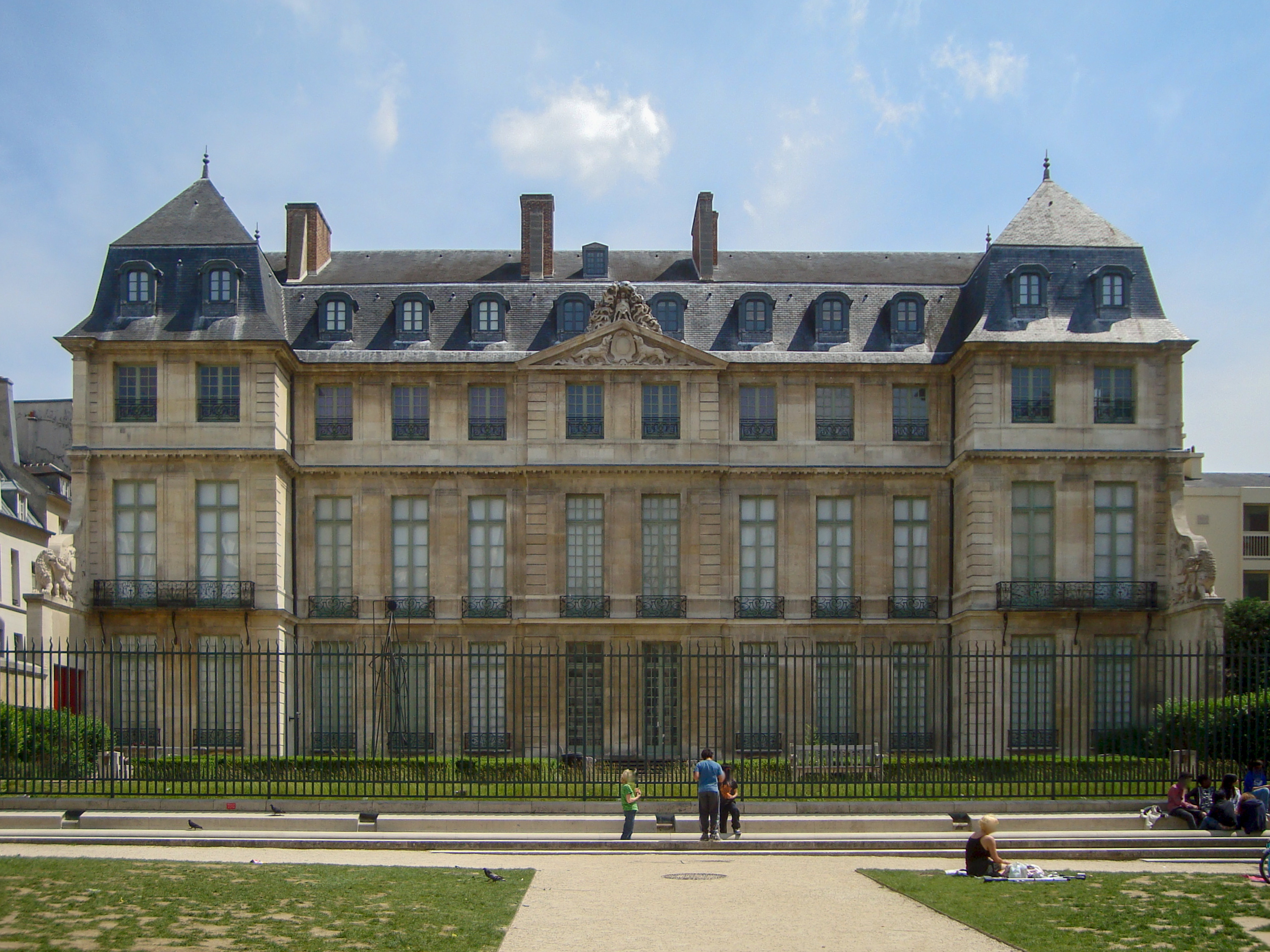
Musée Picasso, Paris (Hotel Salé, 1659)

At the time of Picasso's death many of his paintings were in his possession, as he had kept off the art market what he did not need to sell. In addition, Picasso had a considerable collection of the work of other famous artists, some his contemporaries, such as Henri Matisse, with whom he had exchanged works. Since Picasso left no will, his death duties (estate tax) to the French state were paid in the form of his works and others from his collection. These works form the core of the immense and representative collection of the Musée Picasso in Paris.

In 2003, relatives of Picasso inaugurated a museum dedicated to him in his birthplace, Málaga, Spain, the Museo Picasso Málaga.

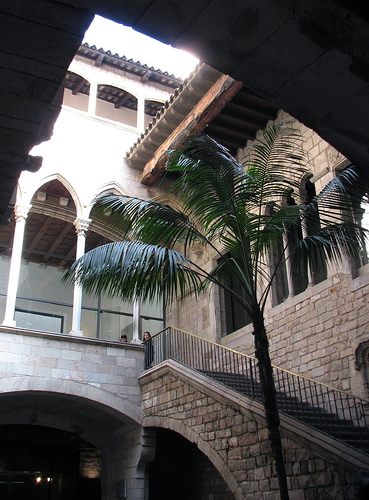
Museu Picasso is located in the gothic palaces of Montcada street in Barcelona.

The Museu Picasso in Barcelona features many of his early works, created while he was living in Spain, including many rarely seen works which reveal his firm grounding in classical techniques. The museum also holds many precise and detailed figure studies done in his youth under his father's tutelage, as well as the extensive collection of Jaime Sabartés, his close friend and personal secretary.

In 1985, Museum Picasso Eugenio Arias' Collection established in Buitrago del Lozoya by Picasso's friend Eugenio Arias Herranz.

From 24 November 2005 to 26 March 2006, Picasso in Istanbul at the Sakıp Sabancı Museum brought together loans from the Musée Picasso in Paris, the Museu Picasso in Barcelona, the Lille Métropole Museum of Modern Art, FABA and the artist’s family collections for the first major Picasso exhibition in Turkey.

From 8 October 2010 to 17 January 2011, Picasso: Masterpieces from the Musée National Picasso, Paris, an exhibition of 150 paintings, sculptures, drawings, prints and photographs from the Musée National Picasso in Paris, was on display at the Seattle Art Museum, Seattle, Washington, USA. The exhibition subsequently travelled to the Virginia Museum of Fine Arts, Richmond, Virginia; the M.H. de Young Memorial Museum, San Francisco, California, USA; the Art Gallery of New South Wales, Sydney, Australia; and the Art Gallery of Ontario, Toronto, Ontario, Canada. (The works were on tour while the Musée underwent a multi-year renovation.) The catalogue was written by Anne Baldassari, the Chairman and Chief Curator of Collections of the Musée Picasso (ASIN B005JX7O16)

It was announced on 22 September 2020 that the project for a new Picasso Museum due to open in Aix-en-Provence in 2021, in a former convent (Couvent des Prêcheurs), which would have held the largest collection of his paintings of any museum, had been scrapped due to the fact that Catherine Hutin-Blay, Jacqueline Picasso's daughter, and the City Council had failed to reach an agreement.

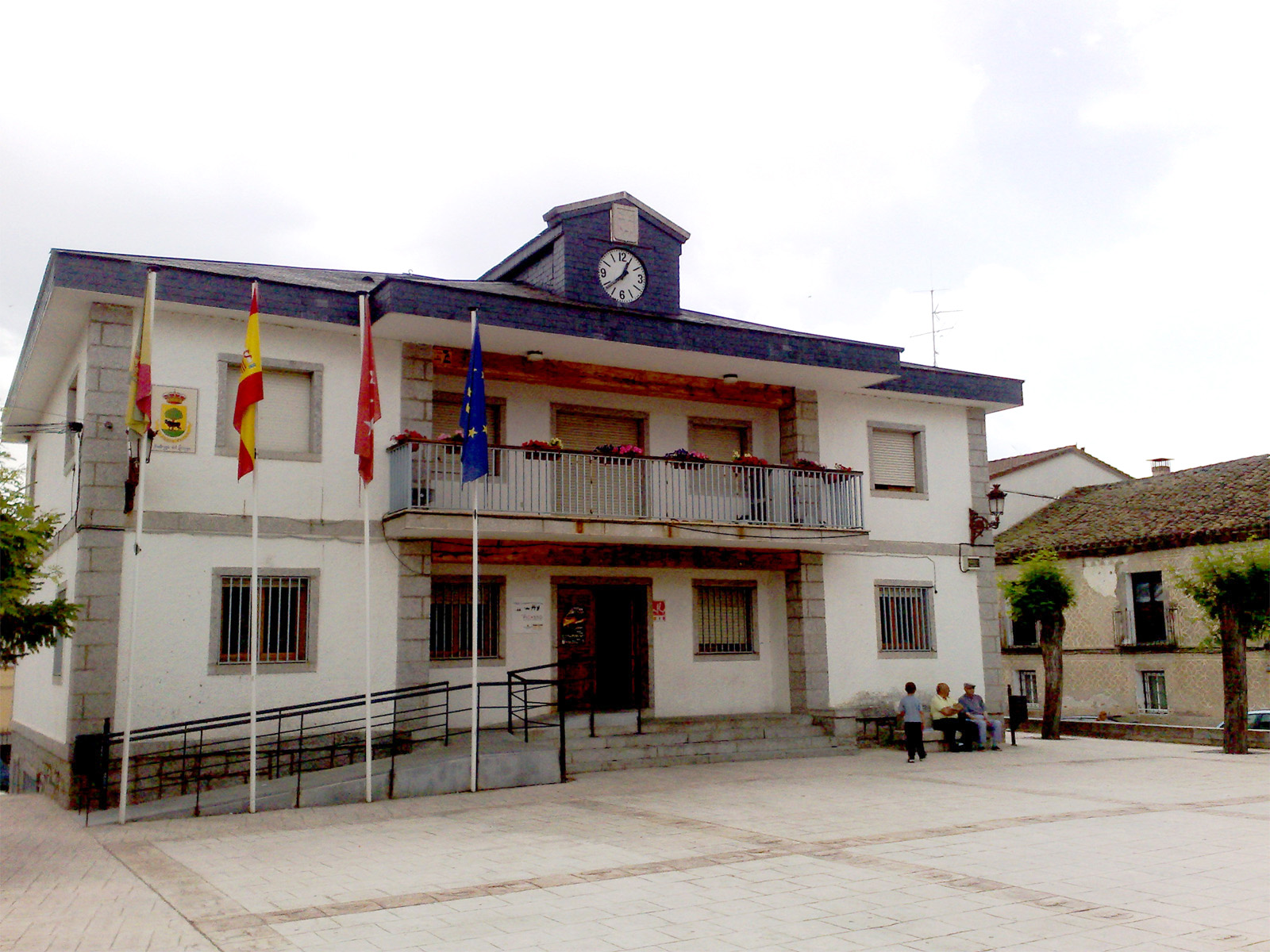
Picasso Museum in Buitrago

As of 2015, Picasso remained the top-ranked artist (based on sales of his works at auctions) according to the Art Market Trends report. More of his paintings have been stolen than those of any other artist; in 2012, the Art Loss Register had 1,147 of his works listed as stolen.

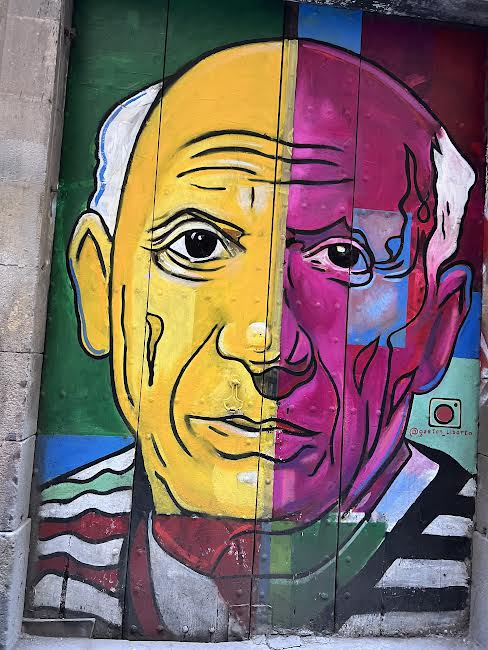
Street art portrait (Barcelona, 2023)

=== The Picasso Administration ===
Picasso's heirs formed a committee to formally authenticate his works at the beginning of the 1980s. However, disagreements regarding the legitimacy of a series of drawings led to the dissolution of the committee in 1993. Two of the children, Claude and Maya, began issuing authenticity certificates separately. Dealers claim that this has resulted in a situation that has been difficult and time-consuming, especially since auction houses were increasingly requesting certifications from both heirs due to the dual (and competing) authentication methods.

In 2012, four of Picasso's five surviving heirs—Claude, Paloma Picasso, Bernard Ruiz-Picasso, and Marina Ruiz-Picasso—established the Picasso Administration to authenticate works by the artist. They announced that Claude should now be the recipient of all authentication requests, adding that "only his opinions shall be fully and officially acknowledged by the undersigned." Claude served as legal administrator of the estate from 1989 until 2023, when his sister Paloma took over.

The Picasso Administration also manages the Picasso estate. The US copyright representative for the Picasso Administration is the Artists Rights Society.

=== Auction history ===
Pablo Picasso, 1905, Garçon à la pipe, (Boy with a Pipe), private collection, Rose Period

Several paintings by Picasso rank among the most expensive paintings in the world. Garçon à la pipe sold for US$104 million at Sotheby's on 4 May 2004. Dora Maar au Chat sold for US$95.2 million at Sotheby's on 3 May 2006. On 4 May 2010, Nude, Green Leaves and Bust was sold at Christie's for US$106.5 million. The 1932 work, which depicts Picasso's mistress Marie-Thérèse Walter reclining and as a bust, was in the personal collection of Los Angeles philanthropist Frances Lasker Brody, who died in November 2009. On 11 May 2015 his painting Women of Algiers set the record for the highest price ever paid for a painting when it sold for US$179.3 million at Christie's in New York.

On 21 June 2016, a painting by Pablo Picasso titled Femme Assise (1909) sold for £43.2 million ($63.4 million) at Sotheby's London, exceeding the estimate by nearly $20 million, setting a world record for the highest price ever paid at auction for a Cubist work.

On 17 May 2017, The Jerusalem Post in an article titled "Picasso Work Stolen By Nazis Sells for $45 Million at Auction" reported the sale of a portrait painted by Picasso, the 1939 Femme assise, robe bleu, which was previously misappropriated during the early years of WWII. The painting has changed hands several times since its recovery, most recently through auction in May 2017 at Christie's in New York City.

In March 2018, his Femme au Béret et à la Robe Quadrillée (1937), a portrait of Marie-Thérèse Walter, sold for £49.8m at Sotheby's in London.

== In pop culture ==
In the 1996 movie Surviving Picasso, Picasso is portrayed by actor Anthony Hopkins. Picasso is also a character in Steve Martin's 1993 play, Picasso at the Lapin Agile. In A Moveable Feast by Ernest Hemingway, Hemingway tells Gertrude Stein that he would like to have some Picassos, but cannot afford them. Later in the book, Hemingway mentions looking at one of Picasso's paintings. He refers to it as Picasso's nude of the girl with the basket of flowers, possibly related to Young Naked Girl with Flower Basket.

Picasso is portrayed by Antonio Banderas in the 2018 season of Genius, which focuses on his life and art.

In the 2011 film Midnight in Paris, which was directed by Woody Allen, Picasso (portrayed by Marcial Di Fonzo Bo) appears as a member of the 1920s Parisian art circles.

In the song "Pablo Picasso", written by Jonathan Richman, the singer compares his loneliness living in New York to the life of the painter. In a 1980 interview, Richman stated that the song was inspired by his own adolescent "self-consciousness" with women.

== See also ==
- Lists of Picasso artworks
- Neoclassicism
- Picasso's written works

== Notes and references ==
=== Sources ===
- Becht-Jördens, Gereon; Wehmeier, Peter M. (2003). Picasso und die christliche Ikonographie: Mutterbeziehung und künstlerische Position. Berlin: Dietrich Reimer Verlag. ISBN 978-3-496-01272-6.
- Berger, John (1989). The Success and Failure of Picasso. Pantheon Books. ISBN 978-0-679-72272-4.
- Cirlot, Juan Eduardo (1972). Picasso, Birth of a Genius. New York and Washington: Praeger.
- Cowling, Elizabeth; Mundy, Jennifer (1990). On Classic Ground: Picasso, Léger, de Chirico and the New Classicism, 1910–1930. London: Tate Gallery. ISBN 978-1-85437-043-3.
- Daix, Pierre (1994). Picasso: Life and Art. Icon Editions. ISBN 978-0-06-430201-2.
- FitzGerald, Michael C. (1996). Making Modernism: Picasso and the Creation of the Market for Twentieth-century Art. Berkeley: University of California Press. ISBN 978-0-520-20653-3.
- Gether, Christian, ed. (2019). Beloved by Picasso: The Power of the Model. ARKEN Museum of Modern Art. 978-87-78751-34-8.
- Granell, Eugenio Fernández (1981). Picasso's Guernica: The End of a Spanish Era. Ann Arbor, Mich.: UMI Research Press. ISBN 978-0-8357-1206-4.
- Jackson, Jeffrey B. (2016). "Chronology" in: The Picasso Project: Synthetic Cubism, 1912-1917. Alan Wofsy Fine Arts. ISBN 978-1-55660-332-7. Archived from the original on 28 February 2023.
- Krauss, Rosalind E. (1999). The Picasso Papers. MIT Press. ISBN 978-0-262-61142-8.
- Mallén, Enrique (2003). The Visual Grammar of Pablo Picasso. New York: Peter Lang. ISBN 978-0-8204-5692-8.
- Mallén, Enrique (2005). La sintaxis de la carne: Pablo Picasso y Marie-Thérèse Walter. Santiago de Chile: Red Internacional del Libro. ISBN 978-956-284-455-0.
- Mallén, Enrique (2009). A Concordance of Pablo Picasso's Spanish Writings. Lewiston, New York: Edwin Mellen Press. ISBN 978-0-7734-4713-4.
- Mallén, Enrique (2010). A Concordance of Pablo Picasso's French Writings. Lewiston, New York: Edwin Mellen Press. ISBN 978-0-7734-1325-2.
- Nill, Raymond M. (1987). A Visual Guide to Pablo Picasso's Works. New York: B&H Publishers.
- Picasso, Olivier Widmaier (2004). Picasso: The Real Family Story. Prestel. ISBN 978-3-7913-3149-2.
- Rubin, William (1981). Pablo Picasso: A Retrospective. Little Brown & Co. ISBN 978-0-316-70703-9.
- Wattenmaker, Richard J. (1993). Great French Paintings from the Barnes Foundation: Impressionist, Post-impressionist, and Early Modern. New York: Alfred A. Knopf. ISBN 978-0-679-40963-2.
- Wertenbaker, Lael Tucker (1967). The World of Picasso (1881– ). Time-Life Books.
