= Citroën Picasso =

Picasso is a term that in the Citroën range from 1999 to 2018 referred to minivans and compact MPVs.

Citroën bought permission to use this name through a very strict contract.

For twenty years, there have been various vehicles bearing this name:

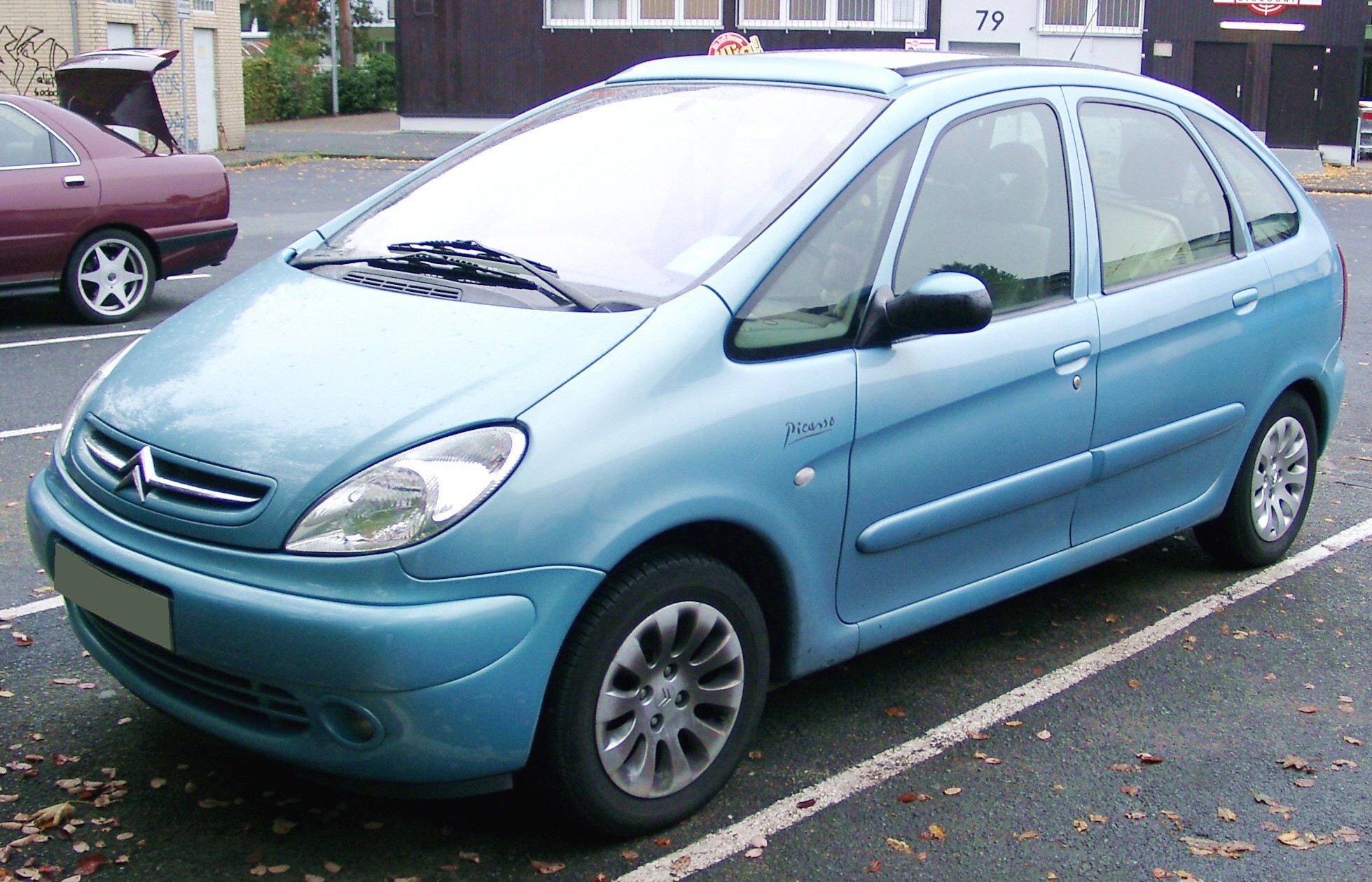
Citroën Xsara Picasso (1999–2008)

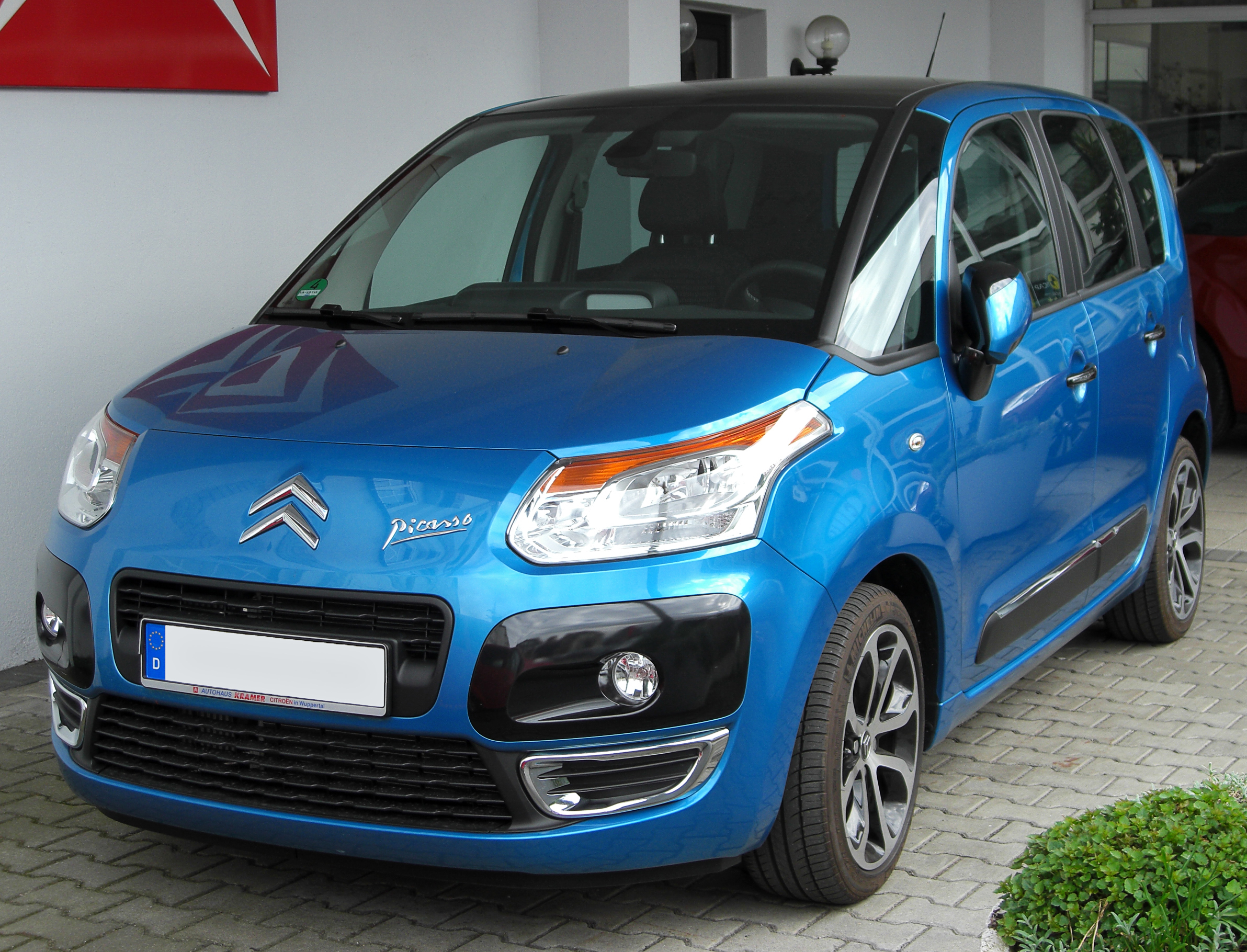
Citroën C3 Picasso (2008–2017)

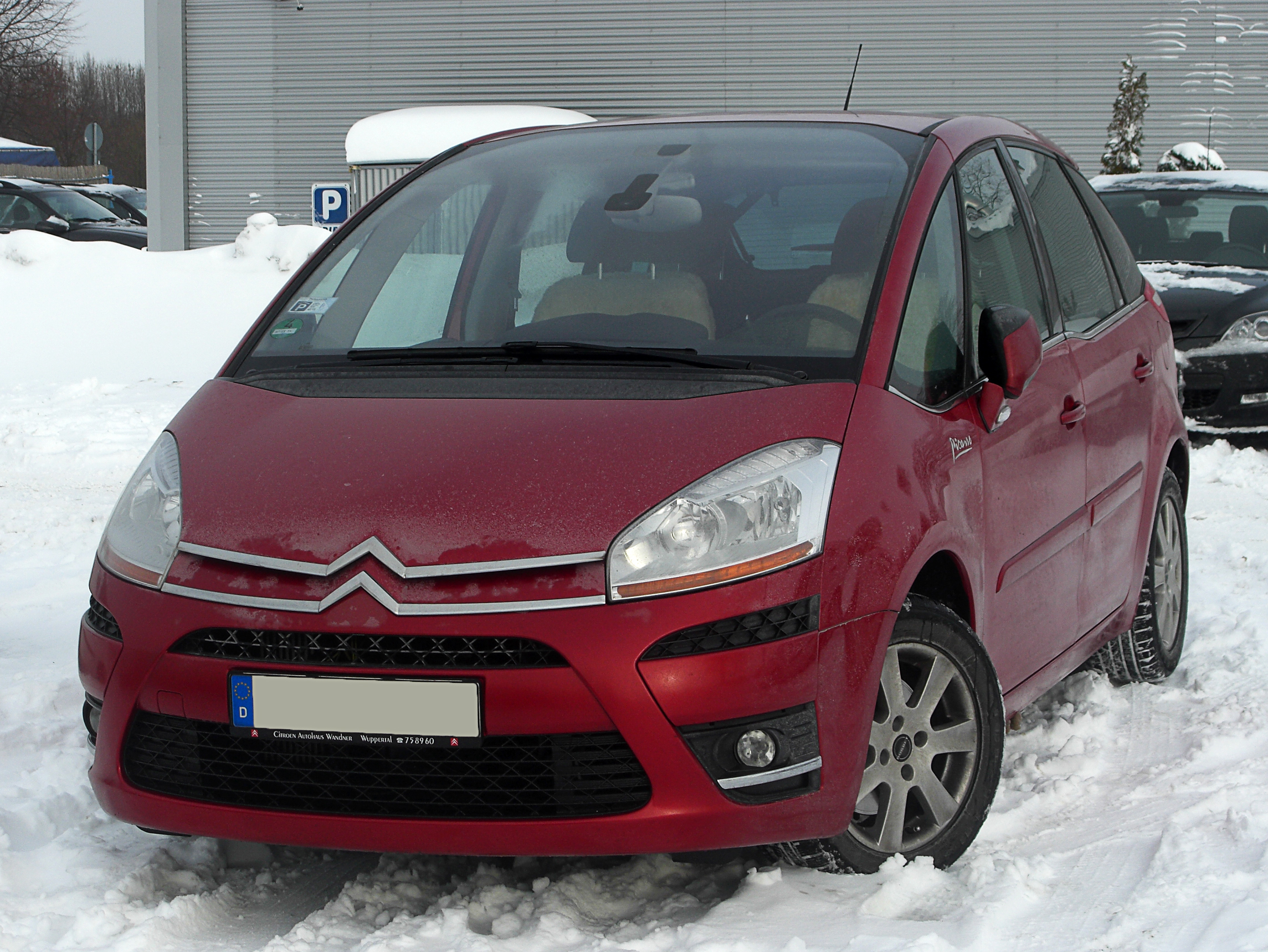
Citroën C4 Picasso/Grand Picasso (2006–2018)
