= Hymn from a Watermelon Pavilion =

Poem by Wallace Stevens

"Hymn From A Watermelon Pavilion" is a poem from Wallace Stevens's first book of poetry, Harmonium. It was first published in 1917, so it is in the public domain.

Hymn From A Watermelon Pavilion

You dweller in the dark cabin,
To whom the watermelon is always purple,
Whose garden is wind and moon,

Of the two dreams, night and day,
What lover, what dreamer, would choose
The one obscured by sleep?

Here is the plantain by your door
And the best cock of red feather
That crew before the clocks.

A feme may come, leaf-green,
Whose coming may give revel
Beyond revelries of sleep,

Yes, and the blackbird spread its tail,
So that the sun may speckle,
While it creaks hail.

You dweller in the dark cabin,
Rise, since rising will not waken,
And hail, cry hail, cry hail.

== Poetic narrative ==
The dweller in the dark cabin may represent the specifically poetic dreamer, like the old sailor in "Disillusionment of Ten O'Clock". Stevens enjoins him not to sleep in his dream, but rather to explore its riches. If the sleeper rises to do so, he remains within the dream, not truly awakened. The poem should be compared to "Anecdote of Canna". (Another comparison has been made to "Of Heaven Considered As a Tomb", in which the poet exhorts "interpreters" to "Make hue among the dark comedians" and "Halloo them in the topmost distances" as he in this poem exhorts his addressee, a "dweller in a dark cabin", to "hail, cry hail, cry hail".)

== Interpretation ==
Doggett offers a different reading, suggesting that the poet does not depict a literal dream world. The dweller is the self, and the dark cabin is the body. The dweller's "sense of reality is obscured as though in a dream, but beside [his] cabin is the vivid actual plantain of green reality and the sun".

Buttel comments on the poem's title. "How appropriate", he writes, "for Stevens' theme to infuse, by such imaginative conjoinings [American watermelon, French pavilion], the earthy, vigorous reality of America with the grace of French words. By such means he was able to be richly aesthetic without sacrificing vitality".
