= The Cuban Doctor =

Poem by Wallace Stevens

"The Cuban Doctor" is a poem from Wallace Stevens's first book of poetry, Harmonium. It was first published in the journal Poetry in October 1921, so it is in the public domain.

The Cuban Doctor

I went to Egypt to escape
The Indian, but the Indian struck
Out of his cloud and from his sky.

This was no worm bred in the moon,
Wriggling far down the phantom air,
And on a comfortable sofa dreamed.

The Indian struck and disappeared.
I knew my enemy was near—I,
Drowsing in summer's sleepiest horn.

== Interpretation ==
This poem is considered one of the shorter poems included in the first book of poems published by Wallace Stevens. The poem meditates on Stevens's increasing awareness, also notably expressed in "The Anecdote of the Prince of Peacocks" (1923), that there are significant differences between imaginative activity and ordinary experience. This theme can be understood as signalling that writing poetry has dangers. Poetic drowsing is liable to attack by the Indian, or by Berserk in "Peacocks", defeating imagination's task of transforming the ordinary. This sense of danger is absent in such earlier poems as "Disillusionment of Ten O'Clock" (1915), where the old sailor need fear no such violence as he catches tigers in red weather.
