= From the Misery of Don Joost =

Poem by Wallace Stevens

"From the Misery of Don Joost" is a poem from Wallace Stevens's first book of poetry, Harmonium. It is in the public domain, having been published in the journal Poetry in 1921 (volume 19, October 1921).

From the Misery of Don Joost

I have finished my combat with the sun;
And my body, the old animal,
Knows nothing more.

The powerful seasons bred and killed,
And were themselves the genii
Of their own ends.

Oh, but the very self of the storm
Of sun and slaves, breeding and death,
The old animal,

The senses and feeling, the very sound
And sight, and all there was of the storm,
Knows nothing more.

== Interpretation ==
The only reference to this poem in Stevens' letters is not helpful. In correspondence with Hi Simons, Stevens writes: "Don Joost is a jovial Don Quixote. He is an arbitrary figure." As Eleanor Cook observes, Don Joost is not jovial, and his resignation contrasts with the bravado that author Miguel de Cervantes wrote in the original Don Quixote:

It seems clear to me...that thou art not well-versed in the matter of adventures: these are giants; and if thou art afraid, move aside and start to pray whilst I enter with them in fierce and unequal combat. (Cervantes, Don Quixote, I.viii, trans. Edith Grossman, 2003)

Buttel lists this poem as among a few from Harmonium that anticipate Stevens's later poetry. The others on his list are "Sunday Morning", "The Snow Man", "Another Weeping Woman", and "Death of a Soldier". Mention could also be made of "Le Monocle de Mon Oncle", with which it shares a focus on leaving youth behind. His body, the animal, has become old. He counts the passage of time by reference to the seasons, and his passage through the seasons is compared to a storm, which is abating. The combat with the sun may be a creative struggle, viewed as finished.
