= The Worms at Heaven's Gate =

Poem by Wallace Stevens

"The Worms at Heaven's Gate" is a poem from Wallace Stevens' first book of poetry, Harmonium (1923). It was first published in 1916 and is therefore in the public domain.

The Worms at Heaven's Gate

Out of the tomb, we bring Badroulbadour,
Within our bellies, we her chariot.
Here is an eye. And here are, one by one,
The lashes of that eye and its white lid.
Here is the cheek on which that lid declined,
And, finger after finger, here, the hand,
The genius of that cheek. Here are the lips,
The bundle of the body and the feet.
. . . . . . . . . . .
Out of the tomb we bring Badroulbadour.

== Interpretation ==
Badroulbadour was a princess married to Aladdin in a fairytale from One Thousand and One Nights. The mention of Heaven's Gate identifies the poem as a commentary on the resurrection of the flesh.

Robert Buttel sees the poem as a specimen of Stevens' "grotesque strain" and wryly observes that "it would be difficult to find a more unique funeral procession in literature". He credits William Carlos Williams for improving the line "Within our bellies, we her chariot." from the original "Within our bellies, as a chariot."

The overall impression is at once macabre and archly humorous. Thoughts of death and decay are secondary to the sound of 'Badroulbadour', the verb 'decline', and the poem's syntactic architecture. But in essence the poem conveys a sense of the transient nature of beauty. For another perspective on this transience see "Peter Quince at the Clavier".

The poem may be compared to "Anecdote of Canna", which describes a unique terrace stroll, and to "Of Heaven Considered as a Tomb", which speculates on the other side of death. Attending to the blank-verse syntax, Buttel compares the poem to Infanta Marina for the delicacy of its rhythm, to which it adds the insistent rhythms of a funeral procession. (See also Cortege for Rosenbloom.)

Out of the tomb, we bring Badroulbadour;

Then in lines three and four,

Here is an eye. And here are, one by one,
The lashes of that eye and its white lid.

Buttel continues:

[T]he reversed initial foot and the following caesura help draw specific attention to the eye; the following three iambic feet maintain the pace of the procession; and the spondees on `that eye' and `white lid' substantiate the reflective consideration of Badroulbadour's exquisite beauty. In the next-to-last line of the poem, Stevens did not hesitate to give full stress to the three main words and let very light accents fall on the preposition and conjunction:

The bundle of the body and the feet.

It was important to hasten over the merely physical attributes of the princess, and the metrical telescoping of the line fits that intention without disturbing the processional rhythm.

The poem surely adds a wry layer of meaning to Stevens' epigram in Adagia, "The poet makes silk dresses out of worms."

== See also ==
- "Frogs Eat Butterflies. Snakes Eat Frogs. Hogs Eat Snakes. Men Eat Hogs" (poem)
