= The Death of a Soldier =

Poem by Wallace Stevens

"The Death of a Soldier" is a poem by Wallace Stevens. It is among those added to the 1931 reissue of Stevens' first collection Harmonium (New York: Knopf, 1923). The poem was originally part of the unpublished Lettres d'un Soldat (1914–1915). The poem uses free verse to describe the death of a soldier.

The Death of a Soldier

Life contracts and death is expected,
As in a season of autumn.
The soldier falls.

He does not become a three-days personage,
Imposing his separation,
Calling for pomp.

Death is absolute and without memorial,
As in a season of autumn,
When the wind stops,

When the wind stops and, over the heavens,
The clouds go, nevertheless,
In their direction.

== Interpretation ==
The poem's longevity reinforces the naturalistic austerity of its depiction of death. One interpretive viewpoint asks whether Stevens is writing about any death, or rather, as Longenbach asserts, the death of the soldier—"and not an ambiguously 'fictive' soldier but Eugène Lemercier [the young French painter killed in 1915 whose letters were collected as Lettres d'un soldat and read by Stevens in the summer of 1917]." Lemercier was the grandson of Irish artist Harriet Osborne O'Hagan. Longenbach claims that the poem's "utter bareness derives from the fact that Stevens was writing not about natural death ... but about a new kind of unnatural death, the daily death of thousands of soldiers on French battlefields."

One response to Longenbach's interpretation is to invoke Stevens's distinction between the true subject of a poem and the poetry of the subject, as he draws it in "The Irrational Element in Poetry".

Now, just as the choice of subject is unpredictable at the outset, so its development, after it has been chosen, is unpredictable. One is always writing about two things at the same time in poetry and it is this that produces the tension characteristic of poetry. One is the true subject and the other is the poetry of the subject.

Then Lemercier's death would be the true subject, and the poetry of the subject would be anyone's death.

"The Death of a Soldier" and other works by Stevens lead Bates to describe Stevens as "a war poet, after his fashion", and Ramazani's "Stevens and the War Elegy" expands on that idea, especially as it relates to post-Harmonium poems that are informed by World War II.

Bates compares the poem to "The Snow Man", particularly its final stanza, in which the snow man must be "nothing himself" in order to behold "the nothing that is". In this respect "The Death of a Soldier" adopts the snow man's point of view, according to Bates. The soldier has a "Lockean mind": "He is the sum of his impressions", Bates writes, "identical, in this instance, with the nothing he does behold". The soldier's "blank slate" (tabula rasa) becomes a blank, so to speak, leaving the clouds to go in their direction. The poem marks a departure from Romantic and Victorian conceptions of death; Stevens does not personify death. Compare to Stevens’ treatment of death in "Invective Against Swans".

The analogy between death and the season of autumn supports the interpretive idea that Stevens's care about the weather is interwoven with reflections on deeper themes such as death and the nature of time. (See the issue between Vendler and Bloom in the main Harmonium essay, the section "The musical Imagist".)

Buttel includes "The Death of a Soldier" as among a handful of Harmonium poems that most notably anticipate the "more reflective, more meditative, more serene, but no less intense" poems of Stevens' later work, not excluding "those magnificent, direct, fervent and profound poems in The Rock at the end—and possibly the summit—of his career".
