= Metaphors of a Magnifico =

Poem by Wallace Stevens

"Metaphors of a Magnifico" is a poem from Wallace Stevens's first book of poetry, Harmonium (1923). It was first published in 1918, so it is in the public domain. The poem experiments with perspective.

Metaphors of a Magnifico

Twenty men crossing a bridge,
Into a village,
Are twenty men crossing twenty bridges,
Into twenty villages,
Or one man
Crossing a single bridge into a village.

This is old song
That will not declare itself ...

Twenty men crossing a bridge,
Into a village,
Are
Twenty men crossing a bridge
Into a village.

That will not declare itself
Yet is certain as meaning ...

The boots of the men clump
On the boards of the bridge.
The first white wall of the village
Rises through fruit-trees.
Of what was it I was thinking?
So the meaning escapes.

The first white wall of the village ...
The fruit-trees ...

It explores the difference between detached reportage in its various foci: twenty men, a single bridge, a village; twenty villages; or one man, one bridge, one village, on one hand and immediate lived experience – the boots, the boards, the first white wall of the village rising through the first fruit trees on the other. Stevens' preference for immediate lived experience addressed in his scornful treatment of William Carlos Williams in "Nuances of a Theme by Williams", is what commentators have in mind when they speak of his sensualism. Magnifico may be one of those men crossing the bridge, shifting from viewing himself and the world from various external perspectives to the first-person viewpoint ("Of what was it I was thinking"?). What explicitly will not declare itself is subjective experience, and yet it declares itself through the action of the poem. The meanings that enable objective description of the world do not declare themselves, and yet the poem ends with them in a reduction that is an usurpation of the subjective.

Buttel cites the poem to support his claim that Stevens has the Cubists' ability to see different perspectives of an object simultaneously: "One must assimilate the multiplicity here", he writes about the various bridge crossings, "just as the viewer of Duchamp's painting must assimilate the fragmentation and multiplicity of the nude descending the staircase".

See also his poems "The Snow Man" and "Gubbinal" for related experiments in perspective.
