= On the Manner of Addressing Clouds =

Poem by Wallace Stevens

"Of the Manner of Addressing Clouds" is a poem from Wallace Stevens's first book of poetry, Harmonium (1923). It was first published in 1921 according to Librivox and is therefore in the public domain.

Of the Manner of Addressing Clouds

Gloomy grammarians in golden gowns,
Meekly you keep the mortal rendezvous,
Eliciting the still sustaining pomps
Of speech which are like music so profound
They seem an exaltation without sound.
Funest philosophers and ponderers,
Their evocations are the speech of clouds.
So speech of your processionals returns
In the casual evocations of your tread
Across the stale, mysterious seasons. These
Are the music of meet resignation; these
The responsive, still sustaining pomps for you
To magnify, if in that drifting waste
You are to be accompanied by more
Than mute bare splendors of the sun and moon.

One reading is that the poem expresses Stevens's distrust of the reason of doleful philosophers and "gloomy grammarians", which creates a layer of obfuscation or "clouds" that occludes the illumination of imagination, "the sun and moon". The clouds may be those of Aristophanes' play, The Clouds, which ridiculed Socrates and the intellectual fashions of the time. The speech of clouds would contrast with "the simplest of speech" that would be enough for those who know "the ultimate plato", as Stevens writes in Homunculus et la Belle Étoile. The poem is consistent with what Stevens called his "pagan" skepticism about religion in Sunday Morning (poem), and his distrust of rationalist philosophy ("rationalists, wearing square hats").
