= The Bird with the Coppery, Keen Claws =

Poem by Wallace Stevens

The Bird With The Coppery, Keen Claws is a poem from Wallace Stevens's first book of poetry, Harmonium. It was originally published in 1921, so it is in the public domain. Librivox has made the poem available in voice recording in its The Complete Public Domain Poems of Wallace Stevens.

The Bird With The Coppery, Keen Claws

Above the forest of the parakeets,
A parakeet of parakeets prevails,
A pip of life amid a mort of tails.

(The rudiments of tropics are around,
Aloe of ivory, pear of rusty rind.)
His lids are white because his eyes are blind.

He is not paradise of parakeets,
Of his gold ether, golden alguazil,
Except because he broods there and is still.

Panache upon panache, his tails deploy
Upward and outward, in green-vented forms,
His tip a drop of water full of storms.

But though the turbulent tinges undulate
As his pure intellect applies its laws,
He moves not on his coppery, keen claws.

He munches a dry shell while he exerts
His will, yet never ceases, perfect cock,
To flare, in the sun-pallor of his rock.

== Interpretation ==
Leiter deems this poem one of Stevens's "most impenetrable" poems, containing "oxymoronic images" whose conflicting meanings must be held in abeyance. (This may not be far from the `Wilson effect' mentioned in the main Harmonium essay.) Bates compares the poem to Infanta Marina as a model of Stevens's use of a symbol to invest a landscape with his feeling for it. The aura of mystery that is characteristic of Stevens's naturalistic studies is evident here in the parakeet's brooding, his pure intellect applying its laws, and his exertion of his will. Compare The Curtains in the House of the Metaphysician for another expression of Stevens's enigmatic naturalism.

By contrast, Paul Mariani in his biography of Stevens has referred to the poem as among the 'darkest' among the poet's criticisms of religion. For Mariani, "A parakeet of parakeets" is an allusion to the biblical reference to the divine as a "spirit of spirits", adopting the metaphor as a diminution of form and importance.
