= Palace of the Babies =

Poem by Wallace Stevens

"Palace of the Babies" is a poem from Wallace Stevens's first book of poetry, Harmonium. It was first published in 1916 and is therefore in the public domain.

Palace of the Babies

The disbeliever walked the moonlit place,
Outside of gates of hammered serafin,
Observing the moon-blotches on the walls.

The yellow rocked across the still facades,
Or else sat spinning on the pinnacles,
While he imagined humming sounds and sleep.

The walker in the moonlight walked alone,
And each blank window of the building balked
His loneliness and what was in his mind:

If in a shimmering room the babies came,
Drawn close by dreams of fledgling wing,
It was because night nursed them in its fold.

Night nursed not him in whose dark mind
The clambering wings of birds of black revolved,
Making harsh torment of the solitude.

The walker in the moonlight walked alone,
And in his heart his disbelief lay cold.
His broad-brimmed hat came close upon his eyes.

Bates takes this poem to signify that the author of "A High-Toned Old Christian Woman" was not altogether "the village atheist". The palace is a church, inhabited by believers for whom the walker has slight regard. They are immature if innocent "babies" nourished on dreams. But disbelief brings loss, as the last two stanzas imply. Night for the moonlight walker brings the harsh torment of crows' wings, not the agreeable angels' wings that animate the dreams of the believers. Bates compares the disbeliever to the rationalist in the sixth of "Six Significant Landscapes", who trims his thinking to the cut of his hat.

Bates suggests that the poem undermines Fuchs's thesis that Stevens's wit is directed mainly at fictions which have failed him, In support of Fuchs, however, one might think that the poem simply acknowledges the loss that attends a perspective that has been stripped of such failed fictions. The solitary walker is "The Snow Man", with a mind of winter.

Bates interprets Stevens as influenced by William James's doctrine of the will to believe. "Between dogmatic belief and dogmatic disbelief," Bates writes, "James had cleared the ground for precursive faith, a willingness to believe. It was this position that Stevens occupied until about 1940, when he adopted a more active posture of voluntary or willed belief." There are two questionable suggestions here. One is that the more active posture is not implied by James's will-to-believe doctrine. The other is that "precursive faith" is leading Stevens back to the beliefs of the babies. Stevens wants an object of belief that is informed by poetic imagination, and he is prepared to name such a belief a "fiction", as in "Asides on the Oboe" (1940).

The prologues are over. It is a question, now,
Of final belief. So, say that final belief
Must be in a fiction. It is time to choose.

Bates reads this as an extreme voluntarism that sanctions believing what one knows to be false, but a less tendentious reading would reject classification of such beliefs as true or false. Rather, they are informed by the perspective revealed by the poet's imagination. A more appropriate binary than true/false is insightful/not-insightful.
