= Doctor of Geneva =

Poem by Wallace Stevens

"The Doctor of Geneva" is a poem from Wallace Stevens's first book of poetry, Harmonium (1923). The poem was first published in 1921, so it is free of copyright.

The Doctor of Geneva

The doctor of Geneva stamped the sand
That lay impounding the Pacific swell,
Patted his stove-pipe hat and tugged his shawl.

Lacustrine man had never been assailed
By such long-rolling opulent cataracts,
Unless Racine or Bossuet held the like.

He did not quail. A man who used to plumb
The multifarious heavens felt no awe
Before these visible, voluble delugings,

Which yet found means to set his simmering mind
Spinning and hissing with oracular
Notations of the wild, the ruinous waste,

Until the steeples of his city clanked and sprang
In an unburgherly apocalypse.
The doctor used his handkerchief and sighed.

== Interpretation ==
The doctor of Geneva, perhaps a doctor like John Calvin used to exploring the depths of religious doctrine, is shaken by his encounter with the raw power of the Pacific Ocean. A native of Geneva used to its landlocked lakes, he is also more familiar with Racine's tragedies or Bossuet's rhetoric than the high-rolling waves that pound the shore where he stands. Though professing no awe, he finds that his old European mind suffers an "unburgherly apocalypse" by his encounter with the art of the New World. Stevens is self-consciously contributing experiments towards a burgeoning American art that may cause traditionalists to use their handkerchiefs and sigh. Vendler sees this as one of Stevens's major themes.

On this reading the poem bears special comparison to The Paltry Nude Starts on a Spring Voyage and Ploughing on Sunday.

A letter from Stevens to an Austrian visitor to America returning to his home in Vienna, may be compared to the poem.

I was tempted to improvise a reply to the question regarding food for the imagination in this country. It is what it is in any country: reality. It is true that reality over here is different from the reality to which you are accustomed. It is also true that it not only changes from place to place, but from time to time and that in every place and at every time the imagination makes its way by reason of it. This is a simple and unrhetorical answer to your question. A man is not bothered by the reality to which he is accustomed, that is to say, in the midst of which he has been born. He may be very much disturbed by reality elsewhere, but even as to that it would be only a question of time. You are just as likely as not when you return to Vienna to be horrified by what you may consider to be extraordinary change or series of changes.
