= Anecdote of Men by the Thousand =

Poem by Wallace Stevens

"Anecdote of Men by the Thousand" is a poem from Wallace Stevens's first book of poetry, Harmonium (1923). It was first published prior to 1923 and is therefore in the public domain, according to Librivox.

Anecdote of Men by the Thousand

The soul, he said, is composed
Of the external world.

There are men of the East, he said,
Who are the East.
There are men of a province
Who are that province.
There are men of a valley
Who are that valley.

There are men whose words
Are as natural sounds
Of their places
As the cackle of toucans
In the place of toucans.

The mandoline is the instrument
Of a place.

Are there mandolines of western mountains?
Are there mandolines of northern moonlight?

The dress of a woman of Lhassa,
In its place,
Is an invisible element of that place
Made visible.

== Interpretation ==
Stevens recognized that his poems were a visible expression of (an invisible element of) his North American place. This would remain true even if the poet were to succeed in overcoming locality, as Crispin attempts to do in "The Comedian as the Letter C". The opening stanza is a dramatic statement about the soul's being composed of the external world, an idea approached philosophically by American philosophers like Charles Sanders Peirce. Compare Theory.

The next lines in the poem are anticipatory assertions, and then two leading questions, and finally a blossoming of the poem's idea in the image of a woman of Lhassa. That interpretation overlooks that the "idea" is expressed as reported speech, however, and fails to identify who "he" is (it is naively assumed to be the poet).
