= Life Is Motion =

Poem by Wallace Stevens

"Life is Motion" is a poem from Wallace Stevens's first book of poetry, Harmonium. It was first published in 1919, so it is in the public domain.

== Overview ==
Life is Motion

In Oklahoma,
Bonnie and Josie,
Dressed in calico,
Danced around a stump.
They cried,
"Ohoyaho,
Ohoo"...
Celebrating the marriage
Of flesh and air.

This playful poem is notable for its introducing exclamatory sounds, and for evoking the American frontier and the simple joy of calico-clad Bonnie and Josie. Stevens returns to Oklahoma, the venue for the first poem in Harmonium, "Earthy Anecdote", which charged a local scene with an aura of mystery. "Life is Motion" by contrast reduces locale to basics, suggesting in its own way that the poet must move beyond it as Crispin did in "The Comedian as the Letter C", even as this marriage of flesh and air is celebrated.

A symbolist reading would understand the flesh as reality, the air as imagination. The poem celebrates Stevens's task, to engage his imagination with reality.

A philosophically ambitious reading would view it as a poetic expression of a process philosophy like that of Alfred North Whitehead.

One critic wrote: "Of the modern poets, Wallace Stevens seem to me the most successful creator of artistic experiences which hum with the energy and motion of life." See also "Metaphors of a Magnifico", where the debt to Cubist studies of motion is particularly evident.

== Media ==
Life is Motion
