= The Revolutionists Stop for Orangeade =

Poem by Wallace Stevens

"The Revolutionists Stop for Orangeade" is a poem from the second edition (1931) of Wallace Stevens's first book of poetry, Harmonium.

Although the poem's title is not atypical in being gaudy, it may be an exception to the rule that the titles of Stevens's poems are not guides to their content. The revolutionists are imploring their leader to let them stop singing in the sun, or at least to resume singing in the shade. And while the captain starts the singing in a voice rougher than a grinding shale, orangeade all around would not be amiss.

The poem reflects Stevens's affection for the Caribbean, and it is as light as a feather compared to other poems added to the 1931 edition of Harmonium, like "Sea Surface full of Clouds".

Direct address and imperative mood ("Ask us not....", "Sing a song....", "Wear the breeches...", "Hang a feather....") keeps the pace brisk in the poem's four stanzas, enhanced in the fourth by the unusual rhyming.
