= Depression Before Spring =

Poem by Wallace Stevens

"Depression Before Spring" is a poem from Wallace Stevens's first book of poetry, Harmonium (1923). It was first published in 1918 and is therefore in the public domain.

Depression Before Spring

The cock crows
But no queen rises.

The hair of my blonde
Is dazzling,
As the spittle of cows
Threading the wind.

Ho! Ho!

But ki-ki-ri-ki
Brings no rou-cou,
No rou-cou-cou.

But no queen comes
In slipper green.

== Interpretation ==
In his 1968 book for Princeton University Press, Buttel remarks, "One would not expect such lyrical delicacy from the Imagist use of the spittle of cows." Its finding beauty in seemingly ordinary or earthy physical details puts him in mind of Whitman's "Song of Myself" and the line from its thirty-first canto: "And the cow crunching with depress'd head surpasses any statue". Stevens's concern about the sound of the poem is evident here, as in "The Comedian as the Letter C", where, among other things, he was exploring the different effects of the letter "c" in English. Here he invokes nonsense lines, suggesting the call-and-response of mating birds, to achieve the desired effect.

One reason why Stevens might flout Victorian poetic conventions about treatment of spring is suggested by Bates, one of whose themes is the importance of appreciating Stevens the American burgher. He relates an anecdote about Stevens writing to William Carlos Williams, quoting Stevens about the pleasures of a season in Nashville, where he was then staying.

I spare you the whole-souled burblings in the park, the leaves, lilacs, tulips, and so on. Such things are unmanly and non-Prussian and, of course, a fellow must pooh-pooh something, even if it happens to be something he rather fancies, you know.

See also "Indian River" for another downbeat take on spring mixed with memorable images.
