= Banal Sojourn =

Poem by Wallace Stevens

"Banal Sojourn" is a poem from Wallace Stevens's first book of poetry, Harmonium. It was originally published in 1919, therefore it is in the public domain.

Banal Sojourn

Two wooden tubs of blue hydrangeas stand at the foot of the stone steps.
The sky is a blue gum streaked with rose. the trees are black.
The grackles crack their throats of bone in the smooth air.
Moisture and heat have swollen the garden into a slum of bloom.
Pardie! summer is like a fat beast, sleepy in mildew,
Our old bane, green and bloated, serene, who cries,
'That bliss of stars, that princox of evening heaven!' reminding of seasons,
When radiance came running down, slim through the bareness.
And so it is one damns that green shade at the bottom of the land.
For who can care at the wigs despoiling the Satan ear?
And who does not seek the sky unfuzzed, soaring to the princox?
One has a malady, here, a malady. One feels a malady.

== Interpretation ==
About this poem Stevens wrote,

"Banal Sojourn" is a poem of (exhaustion in August!) [Stevens' parenthesis]. The mildew of any late season, of any experience that has grown monotonous as, for instance, the experience of life.

Harold Bloom responds: "Stevens, with only rare exceptions, did not comment very usefully upon his own poems. This is not one of the exceptions." Bloom suggests that

the poet feels acutely the universal nostalgia that he is now a touch old to be what clearly he never was, a "princox", a roaring boy or saucy fellow....What the poem shows...is Stevens' anxiety that the poetic voice in him may fail, an anxiety rendered more acute by an imaginative maturity so long delayed."

Challenging Bloom's interpretation, Kia Penso writes, "There is no evidence in the letters or elsewhere to suggest that Stevens suffered from the kind of anxiety that Bloom ascribes to him.". (Evidently she does not consider "Monocle de Mon Oncle" to be such evidence.) She calls Bloom to account for reading the line that begins with "Pardie!" and the following lines "as being about Stevens himself feeling fat and old. And green."
