= The Man Whose Pharynx Was Bad =

Poem by Wallace Stevens

"The Man Whose Pharynx Was Bad" is a poem from Wallace Stevens's first book of poetry, Harmonium. First published in 1921, it is in the public domain in the United States.

The Man Whose Pharynx Was Bad

The time of year has grown indifferent.
Mildew of summer and the deepening snow
Are both alike in the routine I know:
I am too dumbly in my being pent.

The wind attendant on the solstices
Blows on the shutters of the metropoles,
Stirring no poet in his sleep, and tolls
The grand ideas of the villages.

The malady of the quotidian ...
Perhaps if summer ever came to rest
And lengthened, deepened, comforted, caressed
Through days like oceans in obsidian

Horizons, full of night's midsummer blaze;
Perhaps, if winter once could penetrate
Through all its purples to the final slate,
Persisting bleakly in an icy haze;

One might in turn become less diffident,
Out of such mildew plucking neater mould
And spouting new orations of the cold.
One might. One might. But time will not relent.

One point of entry into this poem is Stevens's attitude towards the weather. Is it all he cared about or does it converge with reflections on the passage of time and attendant issues such as ennui and ageing? (The difference between Helen Vendler and Harold Bloom on this matter is noted in the main Harmonium essay, the section "The musical imagist".) This poem emphatically ties 'the time of year' to the relentless flow of time.

Buttel interprets the poem as evoking urban emptiness under the influence of Jules Laforgue. Stevens, he argues, brought the monotony, emptiness and meaninglessness of city life into his poetry. However, Bates reads the poem as issuing a favorable prognosis, "for his cure is implicit in the terms of his complaint: if 'summer' is here, can 'winter' be far behind?" Although Buttel thinks that Stevens would often ask essentially Laforgue's question "Faudra-t-il vivre monotone?", Stevens's despair is modified by exuberance. Bates though doesn't register the despair for he understands "Laforguian boredom" as temperamentally uncongenial to Stevens, mattering to him chiefly as something to overcome. With reference to "The Man Whose Pharynx Was Bad," Buttel and Bates are debating whether a change of season would allow the poet to be less diffident; this is Bates's view. Or is it rather that a season would have to break out of the cycle of seasons in order to overcome this malady of the quotidian? Would summer have to come to rest in some perfected state or winter penetrate to "the final slate"?

Harold Bloom interprets the poem as belonging to a triad in Harmonium, the other elements being "The Snow Man" and "Tea at the Palaz of Hoon." To master the triad is to reach "the center of Stevens's poetic and human anxieties and of his resources for meeting those anxieties". "The Man Whose Pharynx Was Bad" represents a moment in Harmonium's progress in which the poet proclaims diffidence about his future creativity.
