= Hibiscus on the Sleeping Shores =

Poem by Wallace Stevens

"Hibiscus on the Sleeping Shores" is a poem from Wallace Stevens's first book of poetry, Harmonium. It was first published in 1921 and is therefore in the public domain.

Hibiscus on the Sleeping Shores

I say now, Fernando, that on that day
The mind roamed as a moth roams,
Among the blooms beyond the open sand;

And that whatever noise the motion of the waves
Made on the seaweeds and the covered stones
Disturbed not even the most idle ear.

Then it was that that monstered moth
Which had lain folded against the blue
And the colored purple of the lazy sea,

And which had drowsed along the bony shores,
Shut to the blather that the water made,
Rose up besprent and sought the flaming red

Dabbled with yellow pollen—red as red
As the flag above the old cafe—
And roamed there all the stupid afternoon

== Interpretation ==
The subject of the poem is boredom of an afternoon and being saved from it by focus on an experience of brilliant color. The poetry of the subject upsets traditional expectations, especially in the first and last lines. Stevens is experimenting with iconoclasm. The informality and familiarity of "I say now, Fernando" puts the reader off balance, and the last line provokes the belle-lettrist who finds that in this poem Stevens "goes over to the Chinese". For such a critic the poem lacks an appropriately "lacquer finish" and is "marred by the intrusion in the last line of the critical adjective 'stupid'".

‘Wink most when critics wince’, one might say, paraphrasing from "A High-Toned Old Christian Woman".
