= The Curtains in the House of the Metaphysician =

Poem by Wallace Stevens

"The Curtains in the House of the Metaphysician" is a poem from Wallace Stevens's first book of poetry, Harmonium. It was originally published in 1919, so it is in the public domain.

The Curtains in the House of the Metaphysician

It comes about that the drifting of these curtains
Is full of long motions, as the ponderous
Deflations of distance; or as clouds
Inseparable from their afternoons;
Or the changing of light, the dropping
Of the silence, wide sleep and solitude
Of night, in which all motion
Is beyond us, as the firmament,
Up-rising and down-falling, bares
The last largeness, bold to see.

== Interpretation ==
An image like the one in "Curtains" is the "crisp lettuce" that Stevens sought in a poem. The motions of curtains are associated with motions seen of an afternoon and the motions of transition to evening. These associations charge the scene with an air of mystery, leading the reader to a splendid vision of the firmament.

The poem is spare and says little, yet it shows a great deal about a perspective that could seem empty without the imagination's activity, which invests it with depth and ineffability. See "Gubbinal" and "The Snow Man" for other experiments in perspective.

Buttel is struck by "Stevens' fondness for the word 'motions', as an abstract word for the flux of the physical world as well as for the sympathetic movement of the mind". He also remarks that Stevens makes us experience the motion from afternoon to night "as a felt ambience".
