= Lunar Paraphrase =

Poem by Wallace Stevens

"Lunar Paraphrase" is a poem from the second (1931) edition of Wallace Stevens's first book of poetry, Harmonium. One of Stevens's "war poems" from "Lettres d'un Soldat" (1918), it is in the public domain.

Lunar Paraphrase

The moon is the mother of pathos and pity.

When, at the wearier end of November,
Her old light moves along the branches,
Feebly, slowly, depending upon them;
When the body of Jesus hangs in a pallor,
Humanly near, and the figure of Mary,
Touched on by hoar-frost, shrinks in a shelter
Made by the leaves, that have rotted and fallen;
When over the houses, a golden illusion
Brings back an earlier season of quiet
And quieting dreams in the sleepers in darkness—

The moon is the mother of pathos and pity.

The poem makes use of a late autumn night to express a mood. It appropriates Christian images in a manner that is consistent with a naturalism that disclaims religious belief. (See Sunday Morning for another expression of that outlook.) Stevens's post-Christian sensibility channels emotions into nature rather than God and associated religious figures like Jesus and Mary. In this case, pathos and pity are channeled into autumn and the moon. Vendler has proposed that the weather is the only phenomenon to which Stevens was passionately attached, and a poem like "Lunar Paraphrase" shows how that might be true, when the weather is understood as representing nature as a focus for emotions that otherwise might have been given religious expression. Stevens's poetic naturalism was a significant achievement, from which he may or may not have retreated at the end of his life, depending on what one makes of the evidence of a deathbed conversion to Catholicism.

The movement of the moon's old light may be compared to the light in Tattoo, which crawls over the water like a spider.
