= Jasmine's Beautiful Thoughts Underneath The Willow =

Poem by Wallace Stevens

"Jasmine's Beautiful Thoughts Underneath The Willow" is a poem from Wallace Stevens's first book of poetry, Harmonium. It was first published in 1923 and is therefore still under copyright. However, fair use in scholarly commentary justifies its being quoted here.

Jasmine's Beautiful Thoughts Underneath The Willow

My titillations have no foot-notes
And their memorials are the phrases
Of idiosyncratic music.

The love that will not be transported
In an old, frizzled, flambeaud manner,
But muses on its eccentricity,

Is like a vivid apprehension
Of bliss beyond the mutes of plaster,
Or paper souvenirs of rapture,

Of bliss submerged beneath appearance,
In an interior ocean's rocking
Of long, capricious fugues and chorals.

== Interpretation ==
This is a love poem, or the closest approximation permitted by Stevens's sensibility and the indirection of his style, which renders his poems' semantics more or less opaque and often requires an unusually complex syntax. It may be compared to "Le Monocle de Mon Oncle", which can be understood to be about the travails of Stevens's marriage. If "Monocle" reflects on the difficulty of "transporting" love into middle age, "Jasmine's Beautiful Thoughts" muses on the eccentricity of his youthful love and may even suggest that it survives in some form, because of a strength like "an interior ocean's rocking", submerged beneath appearance.
