= Colloquy with a Polish Aunt =

Poem by Wallace Stevens

"Colloquy with a Polish Aunt" is a poem from Wallace Stevens's first book of poetry, Harmonium. It was first published in 1919 and is included in The Collected Poems of Wallace Stevens (1954).

Colloquy with a Polish Aunt

Elle savait toutes les légendes du Paradis et tous les contes de la
Pologne. Revue des Deux Mondes

She

How is it that my saints from Voragaine,
In their embroidered slippers, touch your spleen?

He

Old pantaloons, duenna of the spring!

She

Imagination is the will of things....
Thus, on the basis of the common drudge,
You dream of women, swathed in indigo,
Holding their books toward the nearer stars,
To read, in secret, their burning secrecies....

== Interpretation ==
The French epigraph at the start of the poem is from Revue des deux mondes (Journal of the Two Worlds), a French literary and cultural affairs magazine that has been published monthly in Paris since 1829. The epigraph reads, "She knew all the legends of Paradise and all the stories about Poland." The first-line reference to the Polish aunt's "saints from Voragine" is most likely to Jacobus de Voragine, the author of a medieval bestseller, The Golden Legend, a book of lives of the saints. That book features St George prominently. What would such an author and such a book have to do with Stevens' 1919 poem? One answer might be that in that period St. George appeared on many World War I recruitment posters, and might appear in the romantic imaginations of young women of the time.

The poem dramatizes one of Stevens's major themes, the relationship between imagination and reality. "Colloquy with a Polish Aunt", though, is one of Stevens' many poems that resists the intelligence almost successfully. The critic Helen Vendler writes of this poem that "Some readers have seen his subject as an epistemological one, and have written about his views on the imagination and its uneasy rapport with reality. Others have seen his subject as a moral one, a justification of an aesthetic hedonism. Still others have seen his subject as a native humanist one, the quest of the American Adam for a Paradise in the wilderness."

Stevens did not often bother with justifying his aestheticism, and the term "hedonism" diminishes his artistic ambition to lift himself and his reader from the daily ennui to at least a temporary heightening and intensification of life, an aesthetic experience. Also, the speaker's exchange with his Polish aunt seems to occur in a world far removed from the American wilderness (which one encounters, for instance, in "Earthy Anecdote".

The speaker is on a "high horse" so he can have a colloquy with his devout and somewhat learned aunt. She begins by upbraiding him. She accuses him of being "splenetic" about her idealized saints, whom he probably views as fantasies.

As mentioned above, the aunt's favorite book is Jacobus of Voragine's The Golden Legend. For the skeptical and splenetic speaker, the legendary characters, the saints, are merely old buffoons (rhymes with "pantaloons"). But the Polish aunt pulls the speaker off his high horse. She tells him that the women he dreams of are "common drudges", whom his imagination dresses exotically ("swathed in indigo") and pictures as figures in a pre-Raphaelite painting, who burn secretly for otherworldly saints. What the speaker imagines of the ordinary women is almost accurate. Their imaginations blur together the exotic St. George and other young warriors, young men like those who died in the mud of World War I.

The Polish aunt in this way teaches the speaker a wise lesson about the "uneasy rapport" between reality and the imagination.

== Notes ==
The aunt's imagination dwells on medieval saints; the speaker's imagination dresses drudges in indigo (and all that that implies); the drudges imagine the young men around them as Saint Georges (and all that that implies).
