= Anatomy of Monotony =

Poem by Wallace Stevens

"Anatomy of Monotony" is a poem from the second edition (1931) of Wallace Stevens's first book of poetry, Harmonium. Unlike most of the poems in this collection, it was first published in 1931, so it is restricted by copyright until 2025 in America and similar jurisdictions, because of legislation like the Sonny Bono Copyright Term Extension Act. However, it is quoted here in full, as justified by fair use for the purpose of scholarly commentary.

Anatomy of Monotony

I

If from the earth we came, it was an earth
That bore us as a part of all things
It breeds and that was lewder than it is.
Our nature is her nature. Hence it comes,
Since by our nature we grow old, earth grows
The same. We parallel the mother's death.
She walks an autumn ampler than the wind
Cries up for us and colder than the frost
Pricks in our spirits at the summer's end,
And over the bare spaces of our skies
She sees a barer sky that does not bend.

II

The body walks forth naked in the sun
And, out of tenderness or grief, the sun
Gives comfort, so that other bodies come,
Twinning our phantasy and our device,
And apt in versatile motion, touch and sound
To make the body covetous in desire
Of the still finer, more implacable chords.
So be it. Yet the spaciousness and light
In which the body walks and is deceived,
Falls from that fatal and barer sky,
And this the spirit sees and is aggrieved.

== Interpretation ==
The poet conceives us as evolving and increasingly civilized products of an earthly process. Indeed, the earth itself is growing and growing old, while we sport our complex bodies and venture ever more sophisticated desires. Human experience is a kind of illusion engendered by our evolved sense organs, vulnerable to "the mother's death" and the cold death of the universe. The spirit sees this and is aggrieved, for it would harbor experience in some place that transcends nature, free from the contingencies of earth and universe.

The poem can be read as ironic, as calling into question the pretension of 'the spirit'. This reading is supported by the naturalistic tenor of the Harmonium collection as a whole, and specifically by the parallel of "Invective Against Swans".
