= Stars at Tallapoosa =

Poem by Wallace Stevens

"Stars at Tallapoosa" is a poem from Wallace Stevens's first book of poetry, Harmonium. It was first published in 1922, so it is in the public domain.

Stars at Tallapoosa

The lines are straight and swift between the stars.
The night is not the cradle that they cry,
The criers, undulating the deep-oceaned phrase.
The lines are much too dark and much too sharp.

The mind herein attains simplicity.
There is no moon, on single, silvered leaf.
The body is no body to be seen
But is an eye that studies its black lid.

Let these be your delight, secretive hunter,
Wading the sea-lines, moist and ever-mingling,
Mounting the earth-lines, long and lax, lethargic.
These lines are swift and fall without diverging.

The melon-flower nor dew nor web of either
Is like to these. But in yourself is like:
A sheaf of brilliant arrows flying straight,
Flying and falling straightway for their pleasure,

Their pleasure that is all bright-edged and cold;
Or, if not arrows, then the nimblest motions,
Making recoveries of young nakedness
And the lost vehemence the midnights hold.

It can be read as one of Stevens's poems about the transfiguring power of poetic imagination, which in this case need not accept the night of the dolorous criers, but instead find in it qualities, like a sheaf of brilliant arrows or the nimblest motions, that make it the delight of the secretive hunter.

Buttel finds this poem noteworthy for its connections to Whitman. Like Whitman, Stevens prized the lyrical qualities of American place names and animal names, and the title of this poem is one of Buttel's examples. He reads "Stars at Tallapoosa" as partly a refutation of Whitman's "Out of the Cradle Endlessly Rocking" yet at the same time a variation on the mood and theme of that poem, even displaying some of Whitman's tone and manner, as in the lines about wading the sea-lines and mounting the earth-lines. Less brooding than Whitman's poem, "Stars at Tallapoosa" calls for an "active, imaginative transcendence over the blackness: in the mind's eye of his secretive hunter the intangible lines between the stars should become 'brilliant arrows' which will redeem his isolation."

Eleanor Cook recommends comparing the argument of this poem with Stevens's "Palace of the Babies".
