= Paraphrase (disambiguation) =

Paraphrase is a restatement of the meaning of a text or passage using other words.

Paraphrase may also refer to:

- Paraphrasing of copyrighted material
- Paraphrase mass
- Biblical paraphrase
- Presbyterian paraphrases - traditional Presbyterian church songs
- Paraphrases of Erasmus
- Lunar Paraphrase
- Paraphrase of Shem
- The Heresy of Paraphrase
- The first tome or volume of the Paraphrase of Erasmus vpon the newe testamente
- Paraphrase (computational linguistics) - the automatic generation and recognition of paraphrases
