= Tea at the Palaz of Hoon =

Poem by Wallace Stevens

"Tea at the Palaz of Hoon" is a poem from Wallace Stevens's first book of poetry, Harmonium. It was first published in 1921, so it is in the public domain.

Tea at the Palaz of Hoon

Not less because in purple I descended
The western day through what you called
The loneliest air, not less was I myself.

What was the ointment sprinkled on my beard?
What were the hymns that buzzed beside my ears?
What was the sea whose tide swept through me there?

Out of my mind the golden ointment rained,
And my ears made the blowing hymns they heard.
I was myself the compass of that sea:

I was the world in which I walked, and what I saw
Or heard or felt came not but from myself;
And there I found myself more truly and more strange.

== Interpretation ==
This poem is central to Harold Bloom's reading of Stevens's Harmonium, as marking the poet's progress over the perspectivism of "The Snow Man" and the pessimism of "The Man whose Pharynx was bad". The reader who masters these poems and their interrelationships has, according to Bloom, "reached the center of Stevens's poetic and human anxieties and of his resources for meeting those anxieties". "Hoon" points the way towards Stevens's future development as a poet, in his view.

"Hoon" is easily understood as a philosophical poem, lending itself to interpretation as an exercise in the philosophy of solipsism or subjective idealism such as Fichte's. It can also be read as a statement of a psychological theory like Freud's that hypothesizes an unconscious mental domain that influences conscious mental life. Bordering on such interpretations but neutral among them is the idea that the poem is about the poet's experience of self-discovery through imaginative construction of himself. The poet's creativity in this regard is perhaps extreme, but it makes his self more his self, hence he finds himself "more truly and more strange".

A key to the interpretation of the poem is identification of the addressee, "you", with Nietzsche and Schopenhauer being more likely candidates than either Fichte or Freud.

Milton J. Bates remarks that the regal figure of Hoon is the figure least qualified by irony among the early protagonists of Harmonium.

Without a visit to Hoon in his palaz, one will not appreciate how Stevens's poems of the thirties, though they are not intimately autobiographical, might nevertheless be said to contain and discourse of himself alone.

He adds that the pure poet "bathes his nominal subject in the imaginative effulgence [that] Stevens called the 'poetry of the subject'". The pure poet is distinguished from the local poet who defines himself as the intelligence of his soil, in that the former applies himself to what Stevens called "the idea of pure poetry: imagination, extended beyond local consciousness,...an idea to be held in common by South, West, North and East." (See "The Comedian as the Letter C" regarding the topic of local poetry. See also the main Harmonium essay, especially the section "Locality".)

Although this poem was written before "Comedian", Bates is proposing that Stevens "found Hoon's course more congenial than Crispin's" as his poetic project matured in the thirties. It was not until he took up his genealogical study in the early forties that, according to Bates, Stevens resumed the connection with his native region that had been severed by his move to New York. (See the main Wallace Stevens essay for biographical details.)
