= Harmonium (poetry collection) =

Book by Wallace Stevens

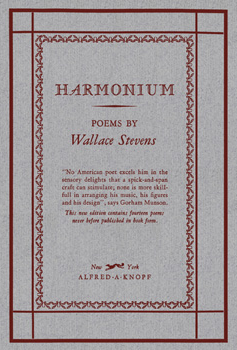
First edition

Harmonium is a book of poetry by American poet Wallace Stevens. His first book at the age of forty-four, it was published in 1923 by Knopf in an edition of 1,500 copies. This collection comprises 85 poems, ranging in length from just a few lines ("Life Is Motion") to several hundred ("The Comedian as the Letter C") (see the footnotes for the table of contents). Harmonium was reissued in 1931 with three poems omitted and fourteen new poems added.

Most of Harmonium's poems were published between 1914 and 1923 in various magazines. The poems are now in the public domain in America and similar jurisdictions.

== Initial reception in 1923 ==
The book's first edition sold only a hundred copies before being remaindered, suggesting that the poet and critic Mark Van Doren had it right when he wrote in The Nation in 1923 that Stevens' wit "is tentative, perverse, and superfine; and it will never be popular." Yet by 1960 the cottage industry of Stevens studies was becoming a "multinational conglomerate", more than fulfilling Van Doren's prophecy that some day a monograph would be written that would pay tribute to Stevens' "delicately enunciated melody, his economy, his clipped cleanliness of line, his gentle excellence." A library search in the twenty-first century at a typical university could be expected to bring up about 200 books under the topic "Wallace Stevens". The Wallace Stevens Journal has been published by the Wallace Stevens Society since 1979 and its editor, John N. Serio, has collected some of the journal's essays in The Cambridge Companion to Wallace Stevens. An audiobook of his complete public domain poems was completed by Librivox in 2007.

== Critical assessments ==
Poet and editor Harriet Monroe, who founded Poetry magazine in 1912, wrote in 1924,

[T]here was never a more flavorously original poetic personality than the author of this book. If one seeks sheer beauty of sound, phrase, rhythm, packed with prismatically colored ideas by a mind at once wise and whimsical, one should open one's eyes and ears, sharpen one's wits, widen one's sympathies to include rare and exquisite aspects of life, and then run for this volume of iridescent poems.

The poet Marianne Moore, Stevens' lifelong ally and friend, wrote shortly after the book's publication of Stevens' "achieved remoteness" of imagination, likening the poems to a painting that Tu Muh commented upon:

Powerful is the painting... and high is it hung on the spotless wall in the lofty hall of your mansion."

"Sea Surface Full of Clouds" illustrates this quality. Although Joan Richardson's reading makes the case that the poem's "true subject" is an extended holiday that Stevens and his wife, Elsie, took in the fall of 1923, and specifically that the true subject is the poet's sexuality, rather it is the powerful "poetry of the subject" that displays Stevens' genius and draws readers to the poem, as Tu Muh was drawn to the painting.

Moore casts Stevens as an explorer of the exotic who takes refuge in a "riot of gorgeousness". She adds that although "Mr. Stevens is never inadvertently crude, one is conscious...of a deliberate bearishness—a shadow of acrimonious, unprovoked contumely." Stevens seems to admit as much in "The Weeping Burgher". "The Death of a Soldier" may have been one of the poems she had in mind, because of its almost brutal naturalism.

Edmund Wilson, writing in The New Republic in 1924, spoke without pretence for most readers of Stevens: "Even when you do not know what he is saying, you know that he is saying it well". This 'Wilson effect' is no doubt linked to Stevens' Adagia aphorism, "Poetry must resist the intelligence almost successfully". "Colloquy with a Polish Aunt" is a good candidate for a Wilson award.

Matthew Josephson ranked Stevens among the best of contemporary poets, writing in 1923 that Stevens exhibits both a poetry of sensuousness and a metaphysical poetry. He favors the latter, as in "Thirteen Ways of Looking at a Blackbird" and "Anecdote of the Jar", predicting that they will be "spell-binding for hundreds of years". By contrast Charles Altieri has recently expressed a preference for the poetry of sensuousness. Stevens matters as a poet, according to Altieri, because of his commitment to the primacy of the senses. "Disillusionment of Ten O'Clock", which peppers the reader with visual images, would serve as a simple example, "Sea Surface Full of Clouds" as more complex.

The Imagist poet and critic John Gould Fletcher wrote in 1923 that because of his honesty Stevens stands "head and shoulders" above the internationally famous aesthetes like Eliot, the Sitwells, and Valéry. He defended Stevens' "obscurity" as deriving from "a wealth of meaning and allusion". He discerned a poet "definitely out of tune with life and with his surroundings, and...seeking an escape into a sphere of finer harmony between instinct and intelligence". "The Wind Shifts" is one poem that supports Fletcher's reading. He warned that Stevens faced "a clear choice of evils: he must either expand his range to take in more of human experience, or give up writing altogether. Harmonium is a sublimation which does not permit a sequel." Stevens seems to have grasped both horns of the dilemma, writing little for several years after Harmonium and then returning with Ideas of Order and subsequent collections that emphasize what Fletcher would classify as metaphysical poetry. Buttel prefers to view the later work as "a kind of exfoliation" of his earlier style, the later poems "adumbrated" in Harmonium. Stevens' first idea for the title of The Collected Poems was The Whole of Harmonium.)

Louis Untermeyer, suspicious of international influences on American poetry, criticized Stevens in 1924 as a "conscious aesthete" at war with reality, achieving little beyond "an amusing precosity". He can only "smile indulgently" at the "childish" love of alliteration and assonance in "Chieftain Iffucan of Azcan in caftan" or "Gloomy grammarians in golden gowns", and he is irritated by the confusing titles: "The Emperor of Ice Cream", "The Paltry Nude Starts on a Spring Voyage", "Frogs Eat Butterflies. Snakes Eat Frogs. Hogs Eat Snakes. Men Eat Hogs". On the evidence of the exquisite miniature "Tea", Alfred Kreymberg had been led to expect a "slender, ethereal being, shy and sensitive", according to Milton Bates, who continues, "the poet he actually met at a social gathering for Rogue contributors stood over six feet tall and weighed over two hundred pounds".

To the caricature of "aesthete" Gorham Munson added "dandy" in "The Dandyism of Wallace Stevens", objecting to what he took to be Stevens' indifference to political and social issues of the era. Munson was impressed by the influence of French: "The whole tendency of his vocabulary is, in fact, toward the lightness and coolness and transparency of French." In view of suspicions about international influences at that time, this may have been unfortunate praise. However, Stevens would have accepted it, having written in Adagia, "French and English constitute a single language".

The epithet "dandy" became "hedonist" in Yvor Winters's 1943 essay "Wallace Stevens, or the Hedonist's Progress", which objected that Stevens did not give primacy to the intellect or to orthodox Christian beliefs. Winters characterized Stevens as "a cool master", in an essay with that title, in which he describes Stevens as "this greatest of living and of American poets".

Possibly the most disgruntled reader of Stevens' early poems was the Irish-American poet Shaemas O'Scheel, the author of an Irish war poem, "They Went Forth to Battle, But They Always Fell". Reviewing Stevens' poems that appeared in the "War Number" (November 1914) of the journal Poetry, O’Sheel, writing in a competing journal, condemned the entire "War Number" but cited Stevens' "Phases" in particular as "an excellent example" of poetry that is "untruthful, and nauseating to read".

Favoring Harmonium's "sensualism", as exampled in "Metaphors of a Magnifico", marks a divide among critics, for there are many who, like Helen Vendler, champion the later poetry. "I think, with others, that Stevens' powers increased with age", she writes.

Josephson chooses these lines from "Banal Sojourn" to illustrate Stevens' poetry of sensuousness:

The sky is a blue gum streaked with rose. The trees are black.
The grackles crack their throats of bone in the smooth air.
Moisture and heat have swollen the garden into a slum of bloom.
Pardie! Summer is like a fat beast, sleepy in mildew...

Josephson's objection to this side of Stevens is that he in his next book "would have to be more and more intimate and scandalous, ad absurdum", and that already this side "has influenced many of his younger contemporaries, and in them, at least, leads to pretense, and murkiness".

There are those who maintain that both the aesthete and sensualist readings overlook the American burgher in Stevens, the successful insurance executive possessed of "something of the mountainous gruffness that we recognize in ourselves as American—the stamina, the powerful grain showing in a kind of indifference". This character trait may be reflected in the element of anti-poetry in Stevens' work, as in his choice of the word 'stupid' in "Hibiscus on the Sleeping Shores", or the "tink and tank and tunk-a-tunk-tunk" of "A High-Toned Old Christian Woman".

"There are in Stevens many moments rich in beauty", Robert Rehder writes, "but he does not want them to be too sweet and resists 'the bawds of euphony'". Stevens' fondness for American locale helps him temper many such moments. A poem like "The Jack-Rabbit" illustrates his affection for rural and frontier America and the native folk tradition, leaving no doubt that his poetry is rooted in America. Poems like "Ploughing on Sunday", "The Doctor of Geneva" and "Bantam in Pine-Woods" are an implicit tribute to Walt Whitman and other American poets, including himself, making evident his pride in the poetic revolution taking place on the North American continent. Indian names are another aspect of Stevens' Americana, as in the title of "Stars at Tallapoosa". Movement away from European influences and toward the responsibility of writing distinctly American poetry may be traced to "Anecdote of the Jar" (1919).

Bates suggests that Stevens the American burgher was self-conscious about the poses of aesthete and dandy, writing,

It is as though Stevens, having assumed the pose of aesthete, had suddenly caught sight of himself in a mirror; thereafter, his dismay and amusement became an integral part of the pose. The same might be said of his dandiacal poems, for the dandy is by definition someone who lives always as though reflected in a mirror; the dandy's vaunted wit sprang in the first place from an awareness of his own absurd pretensions. Further compounding the aesthetic dandy's self-consciousness, in Stevens' case, was his burgherly sense of his own foppish creations.

Allen Tate suggests a different interpretation in maintaining that Stevens' dandyism was "the perfect surface beneath which plays an intense Puritanism". The burgher does not look on with ironic dismay but rather uses the poses to achieve reticence about self-disclosure. The poses allow modulation in revelation of the poet and his world. Tony Sharpe expresses a similar thought when he refers to Stevens as "that exponent of American loneliness".

== Meaning and syntax ==
Stevens is often called a symbolist poet. Vendler notes that the first task undertaken by the early critics of Stevens was to "decode" his "symbols". The scare-quotes are Vendler's. Color symbolism is a vital part of Stevens' poetic technique, according to the symbolist critic Veena Rani Prasad, who proposes the following color scheme for reading Stevens.

blue – imagination;
green – the physical
red – reality
gold – sun
purple – delight in the imagination

Vendler accuses the decoders of producing "some commentary of extraordinary banality", and favors appreciating Stevens' poems by understanding their syntactical novelty rather than by decoding the meanings of their symbols. Stevens lends support to this position, or at least expresses skepticism about 'decoding', when he writes in Adagia, "A poem need not have a meaning and like most things in nature often does not have." The upshot of Vendler's syntactical approach is to situate his poems in the realm of possibilities and potentialities, according to Beverly Maeder, who credits her with pointing the way.

Meaning or semantics is fundamentally about word-world relationships, which are particularly problematic in Stevens' poetry. His syntactical innovations are employed to frustrate simple answers about the relationship between language and reality. For instance, his use of the verb seem gives priority to appearances or aspects: "Let be be finale of seem". Also orienting the poems away from certainties about an unproblematically given world are similes with like or as, the hypothetical as if, the modal might, the conditional, sentence fragments, optatives, questions and protean usage of the verb to be (as when an observer beholds "Nothing that is not there and the nothing that is".

Stevens' symbolism is in aid of a polarity between "things as they are" and "things imagined". This is at least often the true subject of his poetry. However, as the exchange between Joan Richarson and Helen Vendler attests, the true subject of a poem can be a matter of some controversy. For one thing, it can look 'up' to the ideas about imagination/reality, or it can look 'down' to the problems or pathologies of Stevens' life.

Up for grabs is whether "things as they are" are to be understood in naturalistic terms (a tree is a tree) or in idealist or perspectival terms (a tree reduces to the various tree-perspectives) or Kantian terms (there is something, whatever it is, that is responsible for the tree, or the various tree-perspectives: Kant's ding-an-sich). The tree in "Of the Surface of Things" poses an interesting test of such philosophical interpretations. Also there is a moment in Stevens' poetic development when he realizes that the polarity of things as they are and things imagined is not safe, when red bleeds into blue in "Anecdote of the Prince of Peacocks", Stevens' brutal encounter with Berserk. (See also "The Cuban Doctor" for a comparable encounter with the Indian.)

With an emphatic warning about the danger of depending on mechanical symbol mapping to understand Stevens' poems, one can propose that imagination, order and the ideal are often symbolized by blue, the moon, the polar north, winter, music, poetry, and art. Actuality and disorder are often represented by yellow, the sun, the tropic south, summer, physical nature. For instance, sun and moon represent this duality in Harmonium's "The Comedian as the letter C", in which the protagonist, Crispin, conceives his voyage of self-discovery as a poet to be

An up and down between two elements,
A fluctuating between sun and moon,

Sun and Moon comprise an important polarity for Stevens. according to Edward Kessler, who also picks out North and South, Music and the Sea, the Statue and the Wilderness, and Colors and "Domination of Black".

At least as controversial as the question about symbolism is whether and how Stevens' personal life should be read into his poetry. William Carlos Williams was not reluctant to do so, writing some months after Stevens' death, "He was a dandy at heart. You never saw Stephens in sloppy clothes. His poems are the result." The remarkable "Le Monocle de Mon Oncle" is particularly disputed with regard to the relevance of the biographical. Referring to the fact that Stevens' marriage to Elsie turned cold, Milton Bates writes, "Emotional deprivation became to some extent the condition of his craft, the somber backdrop for the motley antics of Harmonium." ("Monocle" may be compared to "From the Misery of Don Joost".) To balance the ledger, the love poem "Jasmine's Beautiful Thoughts Underneath The Willow" may be contrasted with "Monocle".

Another dimension of deprivation to be taken into account is addressed by Stevens in "The Place of the Solitaires" which touches on the solitary discipline of writing poetry. See also "Two Figures In Dense Violet Night" which can be read as a humorous anecdote about the gauche male, or a meditation on the lover's otherness, or the poet's challenge to the imagination of the reader.

As Vendler notes in a discussion of the fluidity of self-reference in Stevens, the impersonal "one" is sometimes favored over "I" in order to enable disclosure of suffering: "One has a malady, here, a malady". And he often refers to himself in the third-person as part of an effort to see himself from the outside: "When this yokel comes maundering". However, note the use of the first-person in "The Man Whose Pharynx Was Bad".

Although Stevens held that "All of our ideas come from the natural world: Trees = Umbrellas", his imagination revealed nature as enigmatic. Bates notes that many of Stevens' images and symbols "combine clarity with an air of mystery". "The Public Square" illustrates this quality. Buttel explains this mysterious naturalism as Stevens' response to the ethos of the Symbolists which brought him to take his earlier transcendentalist leanings, towards a union of nature and the ideal, "in the direction of the dark and mysterious". He was led to become urgently concerned with conveying the indefinable in the poem itself. "The Curtains in the House of the Metaphysician" is as good an example as any. He redirects the longing to know a transcendent realm into nature itself, salving the frustrated platonic desire with his poetic gifts, notably the non-discursive effects borrowed from sound and sight, music and painting. He is ironic, as in "Invective Against Swans" and "Anatomy of Monotony", about the 'spiritual' demand to transcend nature. Another aspect of Stevens' naturalism is his close attention to the perceptual act, particularly as not simply mirroring reality but rather as disclosing it in this or that creative aspect. This is arguably the subject of "Tattoo".

There is an issue about whether Stevens converted to Christianity on his deathbed but his poetry predominantly expresses a naturalistic outlook in which the religious longing for eternal bliss is channeled into a poetic response to nature. "Lunar Paraphrase" can be read as such a response, despite its mention of religious figures. This reading would support what he wrote in Adagia: "After one has abandoned a belief in god, poetry is that essence which takes its place as life's redemption". This enigmatic naturalism is given graceful and elegiac expression in "Sunday Morning". Stevens' skepticism about an afterlife is evident in "Of Heaven Considered as a Tomb". The finality of death is given emphatic expression in "Cortège for Rosenbloom". "Negation"'s witty depiction of God as a bungling potter indicates that the Deity didn't have a place in Stevens' belief system.

In a letter written in 1933 Stevens selects "The Emperor of Ice Cream" as his favorite among his poems because it contains something of "the essential gaudiness of poetry". (Later, in 1939, he wrote a letter expressing fondness for "Fabliau of Florida".) The gaudiness of color images is striking in such poems as "Domination of Black" and "Disillusionment of Ten O'Clock" which also associate Stevens with the imagist movement in early twentieth-century art. There may be a link between the gaudiness of poetry and the title of the book. His original choice was The Grand Poem: Preliminary Minutiae but he may have chosen the title Harmonium for its eponymous relation to a harmonium—that is, a gaudy little organ-like calliope, suggesting Calliope, muse of poetry. Note also the Adagia thesis that words are "the only melodeon".

The gaudiness of Stevens' poetry endears him to many, even those who, with a wink, profess to be among his enemies. It has earned him the sobriquet "the Matisse of poets". Buttel particularly, with reference to "Sunday Morning" and Matisse's Odalisque paintings, is insistent on Stevens and Matisse as kindred spirits. Others are impressed by his affinity with Klee, viewing Stevens as sharing Klee's delight in the playful and evocative ways in which a minimal use of color and scene could create much larger panoramas. "The colors and linear forms in Stevens' poetry evoke images that dance and tease the imagination", Feinstein writes, "in much the same way as the visual images in Klee's paintings".

Marianne Moore favored a comparison to Rousseau, likening the effect that Stevens was trying to achieve with "Rousseau's paintings of banana leaves and alligators". "Floral Decorations for Bananas" nicely illustrates Moore's comparison. Another example of the painterly virtues of Stevens' Harmonium poems is "The Apostrophe to Vincentine" which Buttel views as an instance of Stevens' practice of evoking reality through resemblances between the world and the visual or tactile qualities of paintings. Another example is Explanation and its allusion to Chagall.

The critic Paul Rosenfeld described Stevens as "the musical imagist". "To The One Of Fictive Music" is one deep and difficult justification for this description, invoking the muse of poetry for "an image that is sure" in a kind of music that "gives motion to perfection more serene" than other forms of music summoned by the human condition. This primacy is given an exaggerated statement in the Adagia aphorism, "Words are the only melodeon".

Stevens might also be called the Vivaldi of poets because of the importance to him of the seasons and weather generally. Harold Bloom chides Vendler for writing in On Extended Wings that "the only phenomenon to which he [Stevens] is passionately attached is the weather", replying, "If Mrs. Vendler were wholly correct, readers deeply moved by Stevens might have to murmur that never has so much been made out of the weather." Responding to the seasons, nature, and the world generally is the work of the imagination, whether the poet's or anyone else's, and failure of imagination is associated with death, as in "Another Weeping Woman". The seasons also serve for Stevens' musings on the passage of time, as in "The Man whose Pharynx was bad". Sebastian Gardner shows that the four seasons can be understood as fundamental to Stevens' poetic project, and that a corresponding philosophical project is implicit in his work, assigning different metaphysical import to the aspects of reality brought out in the poetry of each of the seasons.

The Vivaldi of poets has also been accused of "some hazy notion of an analogy between music and poetry". Whether hazy or not, the notion colors such poems as Harmonium's "Peter Quince at the Clavier" and "Infanta Marina", which Vendler likens to a "double scherzo". She also observes that for Stevens "looking and hearing, imagery and musicality, occupy equal ground". Essayist Llewelyn Powys also pursues this notion, finding that "each unexpected verbal manipulation conceals some obscure harmony of sense and sound which not only provokes intellectual appreciation, but in the strangest possible way troubles the imagination". Anca Rosu gives priority to sound: "To Plato's metaphysics of sight Stevens responds with a metaphysics of sound."

See Michael O. Stegman's "Checklist of Musical Compositions Relating to Stevens" for a considerable number of musical tributes to Stevens, such as John Gardner's "Five Partsongs to Poems by Wallace Stevens".

Stevens the ironist should not be overlooked. Irony (arguably) suffuses "The Ordinary Women", "Invective Against Swans", "Nuances of a Theme by Williams" and other poems in Harmonium. Also a sense of humor is a significant characteristic of the collection, as indicated by many of the poem titles and in some cases by the content as well. Both title and content of "Cy Est Pourtraicte, Madame Ste Ursule, et Les Unze Mille Vierges" testify to this lighter side. Samuel French Morse, who categorized the years 1914–1930 as the Harmonium years, wrote that nothing Stevens was to write later would achieve "the particular comic quality of these early exercises" in Harmonium, though the tone of the poetry would deepen. Even Stevens' experimentation with perspective, coolly executed in "The Snow Man", is presented with bawdy humor in a poem like "A High-Toned Old Christian Woman". One vein of Stevens' poetic humour expresses his reaction against the conventions of the Victorian tradition. "Depression Before Spring" for instance refuses to gush about spring as a season of renewal; it compares a fair maiden's flaxen hair to cow spit; and it introduces such "unpoetic" lines as "Ho! Ho!" and

But ki-ki-ri-ki
Briings no rou-cou
No rou-cou-cou.

Another aspect of Stevens' sense of humor is the cleverness of such poems as "Anecdote of Canna" and "Hymn From a Watermelon Pavilion" which subtly exploit within-a-dream scenarios.

Stevens seems to have attempted to achieve a balance between somber and light in the Harmonium collection. For instance, though most of the fourteen poems introduced in the second (1931) edition, like "Sea Surface full of Clouds", are somber, "The Revolutionists stop for Orangeade" is light.

In the ancient quarrel between poetic imagination and philosophical reason, Stevens sides with the former, though he emphasizes not an unchanging mental faculty but rather the continual work of imaginative reconstruction of the material the world provides—turning ever-changing shades of green into ever-changing shades of blue, so to speak. One of Stevens' themes is the contrast between an imaginative, poetic disclosure of reality as opposed to rationalist abstraction. See for example "On the Manner of Addressing Clouds". Stevens defends the sensuous ground he favors against the philosophers' Plato in "Homunculus et la Belle Etoile", contrasting and recommending instead "the ultimate Plato".

Despite Stevens' commitment to this theme, interpreters have not been prevented from exploring the philosophical implications of his poetry. A few poems from Harmonium, on no account excluding "The Comedian as the Letter C", "O Florida, Venereal Soil", "Bantams in Pine Woods", "Palace of the Babies" and "Theory" are occasionally mentioned as examples of pataphysics, an attempt to go beyond metaphysics that is sometimes cited as responsible for the high tides of language in Stevens' poetry. It has also been read as expressing philosophies as various as Santayana's, Nietzsche's and Kant's. (See "The Snow Man" and "Gubbinal" for some references.) Many would agree with Simon Critchley, who favors a broadly Kantian reading, that Stevens was the philosophically most important poet writing in English in the twentieth century. Anca Rosu reads Stevens as claiming poetry as a way of thinking and reaching for the knowledge usually associated with philosophy. This brings him close to Martin Heidegger, she writes, but "the notable difference is that while Heidegger's passion for poetry threatens his profession—philosophy, as it has traditionally been understood—with its end, Stevens, being a poet, can only triumph in the triumph of poetry". She finds deeper philosophical affinities between Stevens and the American philosophers William James and George Santayana "who themselves challenged the tenets of traditional philosophy by stressing the cultural construction of such notions as reality, truth, and knowledge". She emphasizes that Stevens' purpose is not to replace philosophy with poetry but "to enhance the poetic and endow it with philosophical import".

As for Earthy Anecdote, Vendler believes that "this apparently trivial little poem" revealed to Stevens how much his art depended on obstructions and the consequent swerves they provoked. On the other (dramatically different) hand, Nicholson reads it as an anecdote about planet Earth. The bucks are spinning planets and the firecat is the Sun—so the poem's title is a pun.

Stevens is on record as saying that he "intended something quite concrete: actual animals, not original chaos", commenting on Walter Pach's illustration for his poem, which he judged "just the opposite of my idea". If chaos is just the opposite of his idea, Nicholson's astronomical interpretation might fall under the same censure, and perhaps Vendler's "poet's struggles" reading as well. Martha Strom's approach may be more in line with Stevens' idea. She explains the position of the poem at the beginning of Harmonium as signifying Stevens' departure from the dominant 'local' school, which enjoined the poet to stay close to his roots and locale. She writes,

Stevens locates the bucks in Oklahoma, which firmly situates the poem in the "local" school of writing, but he imbues the localist donnée — a particular landscape, some bucks, and a cat in Oklahoma — with the motion of his imagination, and the flat "local" scene acquires texture and life.

She quotes from an editorial on 'Local Color' that Stevens wrote in 1900 while an undergraduate at Harvard and president of The Harvard Advocate, proposing that Stevens' interest in overcoming locality can be traced back to those days.

So many of the stories submitted to us of late have had their scenes laid in and about the College...that a word in regard to local color may not be out of place. It is of course possible for an amusing event to take place in the Yard....But because an event does take place in the Yard does not make it amusing....Nevertheless it seems to be a popular fallacy with a great many contributors that it is only necessary to stay within the shadow of the dormitories to write an entertaining story or poem.

This departure from the strictures of "locality" reaches a fulfillment in the final poem that Stevens wrote for Harmonium, "The Comedian as the Letter C", in which the poet voyages away from his local soil into a sea of poetic possibilities that, he supposes, will occasion his artistic growth. However, Crispin is left there at an impasse, frustrated in his hope to find roots in some locale or other. One reading of "Tea at the Palaz of Hoon" is that it anticipates the direction that Stevens would take in the thirties, towards a pure poetry that would be independent of locale.

== Second edition: Table of Contents (1930) ==
- Earthy Anecdote
- Invective Against Swans
- In the Carolinas
- The Paltry Nude Starts on a Spring Voyage
- The Plot Against the Giant
- Infanta Marina
- Domination of Black
- The Snow Man
- The Ordinary Women
- The Load Of Sugar-Cane
- Le Monocle de Mon Oncle
- Nuances of a Theme by Williams
- Metaphors of a Magnifico
- Ploughing on Sunday
- Cy Est Pourtraicte, Madame Ste Ursule, et Les Unze Mille Vierges
- Hibiscus on the Sleeping Shores
- Fabliau of Florida
- The Doctor of Geneva
- Another Weeping Woman
- Homunculus et la Belle Etoile
- The Comedian as the Letter C
- From the Misery of Don Joost
- O Florida, Venereal Soil
- Last Looks at the Lilacs
- The Worms at Heaven's Gate
- The Jack-Rabbit
- Anecdote of Men by the Thousand
- The Silver Plough Boy
- The Apostrophe to Vincentine
- Floral Decorations for Bananas
- Anecdote of Canna
- On the Manner of Addressing Clouds
- Of Heaven Considered as a Tomb
- Of the Surface of Things
- Anecdote of the Prince of Peacocks
- A High-Toned Old Christian Woman
- The Place of the Solitaires
- The Weeping Burgher
- The Curtains in the House of the Metaphysician
- Banal Sojourn
- Depression Before Spring
- The Emperor of Ice-Cream
- The Cuban Doctor
- Tea at the Palaz of Hoon
- Exposition of the Contents of a Cab
- Disillusionment of Ten O'Clock
- Sunday Morning
- The Virgin Carrying a Lantern
- Stars at Tallapoosa
- Explanation
- Six Significant Landscapes
- Bantams in Pine-Woods
- Anecdote of the Jar
- Palace of the Babies
- Frogs Eat Butterflies. Snakes Eat Frogs. Hogs Eat Snakes. Men Eat Hogs
- Jasmine's Beautiful Thoughts Underneath The Willow
- Cortège for Rosenbloom
- Tattoo
- The Bird with the Coppery, Keen Claws
- Life Is Motion
- Architecture
- The Wind Shifts
- Colloquy with a Polish Aunt
- Gubbinal
- Two Figures In Dense Violet Night
- Theory
- To the One of Fictive Music
- Hymn from a Watermelon Pavilion
- Peter Quince at the Clavier
- Thirteen Ways of Looking at a Blackbird
- Nomad Exquisite
- Tea

 Poems Added to Harmonium (1931)

- The Man Whose Pharynx Was Bad
- The Death of a Soldier
- Negation
- The Surprises of the Superhuman
- Sea Surface Full of Clouds
- The Revolutionists Stop for Orangeade
- New England Verses
- Lunar Paraphrase
- Anatomy of Monotony
- The Public Square
- Sonatina to Hans Christian
- In the Clear Season of Grapes
- Two at Norfolk
- Indian River

For reasons that perplex critics, Harmonium begins with "Earthy Anecdote". This poem must be "some sort of manifesto", Helen Vendler speculates, "but of what was it the proclamation?" Similar puzzles surround the second poem in Harmonium, "Invective Against Swans". Why would Stevens write an insult poem attacking swans? Why the aspic nipple in the third poem, "In the Carolinas"? What manner of nude "scuds the glitters" on a weed, as in "The Paltry Nude Starts on a Spring Voyage"? Who is the giant in "The Plot Against the Giant" and why can he be undone by heavenly labials? What is a "Gubbinal"? Why does the listener in "The Snow Man" become "nothing himself" and behold "the nothing that is"? Is "The Emperor of Ice Cream" simply a nonsense ditty or does it have some discursive meaning? Is Crispin's voyage in "The Comedian as the Letter C" a success or a failure? What is the mistake that Caliper makes in "Last Looks at the Lilacs" when he scratches his buttocks and tells the divine ingenue that the bloom of lilacs is the fragrance of vegetal? Should the reader be amused or appalled by the remarkable funeral procession in "The Worms at Heaven's Gate"?

== The Collected Poems edition (1954) ==
When Stevens republished Harmonium in 1954 as part of his Collected Poems, he used the 1931 edition as the basis. He did however make some changes. The final two poems of the 1923 edition were moved to the end of the book, so that they followed the 1931 additions. The poem titled "Of the Manner of Addressing Clouds" was, in this later edition retitled "On the Manner of Addressing Clouds" and the poem "Valley Candle" was added to the book between "The Jack-Rabbit" and "Anecdote of Men by the Thousand".

Earthy Anecdote
Opening poem of Harmonium collection
