= Cortège for Rosenbloom =

Poem by Wallace Stevens

"Cortege for Rosenbloom" is a poem from Wallace Stevens's first book, Harmonium. First published in 1921, it is in the public domain in the United States and similar jurisdictions.

Cortege for Rosenbloom

Now, the wry Rosenbloom is dead
And his finical carriers tread
On a hundred legs, the tread
Of the dead.
Rosenbloom is dead.

They carry the wizened one
Of the color of horn
To the sullen hill,
Treading a tread
In unison for the dead.

Rosenbloom is dead.
The tread of the carriers does not halt
On the hill, but turns
Up the sky.
They are bearing his body into the sky.

It is the infants of misanthropes
And the infants of nothingness
That tread
The wooden ascents
Of the ascending of the dead.

It is turbans they wear
And boots of fur
As they tread the boards
In a region of frost,
Viewing the frost,

To a chirr of gongs
And a chitter of cries
And the heavy thrum
Of the endless tread
That they tread;

To a jangle of doom
And a jumble of words
Of the intense poem
Of the strictest prose
Of Rosenbloom.

And they bury him there,
Body and soul,
In a place in the sky.
The lamentable tread!
Rosenbloom is dead.

== Interpretation ==
A letter written by Stevens in 1921 includes a commentary on this poem; he alludes therein to one Miss Fowler at Tufts College who wrote a letter to the editor of a collection of poetry that included Rosenbloom. Her letter left Stevens uncertain whether she was looking for exegesis or an apology for the editor's choice of the poem. He continues:

From time immemorial the philosophers and other scene painters have daubed the sky with dazzle paint. But it all comes down to the proverbial six feet of earth in the end. This is as true of Rosenbloom as of Alcibiades. It cannot be possible that they have never munched this chestnut at Tufts. The ceremonies are amusing. Why not fill the sky with scaffolds and stairs, and go about like genuine realists?

The reader of the poem almost hears the tread of the "finical carriers" of Rosenbloom's body in the slow march of this funeral procession. Although the poem's heavy beats leave no doubt that Stevens' naturalism is being expressed, there is a suggestion of ineffability when the tread of the carriers "turns up the sky". The label transcendental naturalism is not ill-suited to characterize the outlook of this and similar poems in Stevens' oeuvre.

The transcendental naturalism of some of Colin McGinn's work, which construes the mind-body connection (the 'world knot') as a natural feature of Homo sapiens but 'cognitively closed' to our epistemic horizons, is a philosophical analog of this outlook. Stevens comprehends the philosophical impulse to comprehend the transcendent but deems it doomed to fail. We can fill the sky with scaffolds and stairs, but they will not take us where we might want to go. Stevens's so-called 'pataphysics' could be viewed as a poetic redirection of the frustrated philosophical desire to know the transcendent nature of things. Compare "Homunculus et la Belle Etoile" and "Invective Against Swans".

Buttel cites this poem to illustrate the rhythmic effects of Stevens's free verse, comparing and contrasting its effects with those of "Infanta Marina".
