= Anecdote of the Jar =

Poem by Wallace Stevens

Anecdote of the Jar

I placed a jar in Tennessee,
And round it was, upon a hill.
It made the slovenly wilderness
Surround that hill.

The wilderness rose up to it,
And sprawled around, no longer wild.
The jar was round upon the ground
And tall and of a port in air.

It took dominion everywhere.
The jar was gray and bare.
It did not give of bird or bush,
Like nothing else in Tennessee.

"Anecdote of the Jar" is a poem from Wallace Stevens's first book of poetry, Harmonium. Wallace Stevens is an important figure in 20th century American poetry. The poem was first published in 1919, it is in the public domain. Wallace Stevens wrote the poem in 1918 when he was in the town of Elizabethton, Tennessee.

== Interpretation ==
"Anecdote of the Jar" can be taken literally but is best served figuratively. Others see in it political issues. From a feminist viewpoint, the jar represents the male ego placed firmly in a female environment, Mother Nature, causing mayhem and possible destruction. Some think the jar is a symbol of industrial imperialism, taking over the environment and manipulating the wilderness.

This much-anthologized poem succinctly accommodates a remarkable number of different and plausible interpretations, as Jacqueline Brogan observes in a discussion of how she teaches it to her students. Robert Buttel suggested in 1967 that the speaker would arrange the wild landscape into the order of a still life, and though his success is qualified, art and imagination do at least impose an idea of order on the sprawling reality.

Helen Vendler, Arthur Kingsley Porter University Professor Emerita at Harvard University, in a reading from 1984 that contradicts Buttel, asserts that the poem is incomprehensible except as understood as a commentary on Keats's "Ode on a Grecian Urn". The poem alludes to Keats, she argues, as a way of discussing the predicament of the American artist "who cannot feel confidently the possessor, as Keats felt, of the Western cultural tradition." Vendler asks, shall the poet use language imported from Europe ("of a port in air", to "give of"), or as Marianne Moore puts it, "plain American that cats and dogs can read", like "The jar was round upon the ground"? She argues that the poem is a palinode, retracting the Keatsian conceits of "Sunday Morning" and vowing "to stop imitating Keats and seek a native American language that will not take the wild out of the wilderness."

According to Brogan, however (writing in 1994), the poem can be approached:

- from a New Critical perspective as a poem about writing poetry and making art generally;
- from a poststructuralist perspective as a poem concerned with temporal and linguistic disjunction, especially in the convoluted syntax of the last two lines;
- from a feminist perspective that reveals a poem concerned with male dominance over a traditionally feminized landscape;
- or from the perspective of a cultural critic that might find a sense of industrial imperialism.

Brogan concludes, "When the [student] debate gets particularly intense, I introduce Roy Harvey Pearce's discovery of the Dominion canning jars (a picture of which is then passed around)," a reference to that late, celebrated Wallace Stevens scholar and historiographer of literature's published association of the poem with a specific item of physical Americana.

Kevin O'Donnell, writing in 2023, presents the poem in the context of Stevens' work as a surety bond claimsman tied to the industrial clearcutting of the last remnant of the great Appalachian forest in East Tennessee in 1918.
