= Floral Decorations for Bananas =

Poem by Wallace Stevens

"Floral Decorations for Bananas" is a poem from Wallace Stevens's first book of poetry, Harmonium (1923). It was first published Measure 26 (Apr. 1923) and is therefore under copyright, however it is quoted here as justified by fair use in order to facilitate scholarly commentary.

The poem's speaker is unhappy about the choice of bananas as a table decoration, complaining that they don't match well with the eglantine. Recommended instead are plums in an eighteenth-century dish, centering a room in which there would be women delicately embroidering. If bananas must be considered, then the mood and decor are shifted entirely. Rather than a single clumsy bunch, a massive branch of the fruit should be carried in on planks, surrounded (or borne?) by exotic women "of shanks and bangles," leading further to a fantasy of tropic sensuality. A demented, campy interior decorator is evoked.

Floral Decorations for Bananas

Well, nuncle, this plainly won't do.
These insolent, linear peels
And sullen, hurricane shapes
Won't do with your eglantine.
They require something serpentine.
Blunt yellow in such a room!

You should have had plums tonight,
In an eighteenth-century dish,
And pettifogging buds,
For the women of primrose and purl
Each one in her decent curl.
Good God! What a precious light!

But bananas hacked and hunched....
The table was set by an ogre,
His eye on an outdoor gloom
And a stiff and noxious place.
Pile the bananas on planks.
The women will be all shanks
And bangles and slatted eyes.

And deck the bananas in leaves
Plucked from the Carib trees
Fibrous and dangling down,
Oozing cantankerous gum
Out of their purple maws,
Darting out of their purple craws
Their musky and tingling tongues.

== Interpretation ==
This poem finds Stevens, the cool master as Yvor Winters described him, in warm good humor, putting the world's raw material in tension with imagination's desire for a sophisticated construct. The raw bananas don't quite succumb, and there is a suggestion that this is not a bad thing, if only to provide energy and impetus for imagination's renewal. Alternatively, the poem can be interpreted as about the dangers of blatant sexuality and Stevens's "fear of the force of female sexuality".

Surely Marianne Moore had this poem foremost in mind when she compared Stevens's efforts in Harmonium to Henri Rousseau's paintings. There is lushness and sexuality in both.

The poetic device that Robert Buttel noted in connection with "The Apostrophe to Vincentine is at work here too", in what Eleanor Cook, following art historian Ernst Gombrich, calls inverted recognition, "the recognition not of reality in a painting but of a painting inreality".
