= The Place of the Solitaires =

Poem by Wallace Stevens

"The Place of the Solitaires" is a poem from Wallace Stevens's first book of poetry, Harmonium. It was first published in the journal Poetry in October, 1919, so it is in the public domain.

The Place of the Solitaires

Let the place of the solitaires
Be a place of perpetual undulation.

Whether it be in mid-sea
On the dark, green water-wheel,
Or on the beaches,
There must be no cessation
Of motion, or of the noise of motion,
The renewal of noise
And manifold continuation;

And, most, of the motion of thought
And its restless iteration,

In the place of the solitaires,
Which is to be a place of perpetual undulation.

Some interpreters understand the poem as an expression of Heraclitus's philosophy that all is flux. Others classify it as among those poems that are all about style, with no content to speak of. The poet Mark Strand takes a different tack, assuring the reader that in order to understand this poem, "[O]ne only has to remember the perpetual undulation has not only to do with the recurrent motion of the waves but the desired motion of the hand as it writes. The poetry of the subject makes reference to sea and beaches, whereas the true subject of the poem is Stevens's craft as a poet. Writing is a solitary vocation, a place for "the solitaires" who must practise continual motion of thought and inscription.

As usual Stevens is willing to communicate, but does not go out of his way to make his meaning plain. "One does not write for any reader except one," as he says in Adagia, and also, less solipsistically, "Poetry must resist the intelligence almost successfully." Other writers and immigrants to the world of thought can perhaps be inspired by "The place of the solitaires" as a response to the solitary and somewhat melancholy life of the mind. (Adagia: "Poetry is a form of melancholia.")

The poetry of the subject is paramount, and to that extent it is important to appreciate the poem's syntactic structure and its evocation of a Heraclitian mood. This primacy is why "Poetry is not a personal matter". Yet poems have roots in the poet's life. They have subjects "that are the symbols of one's self or of one of one's selves".

See also "Le Monocle de Mon Oncle" for the distinction between the poetry of the subject and the subject of the poem, and "The Weeping Burgher" for a more subjective perspective on the poet's craft.
