= Frogs Eat Butterflies. Snakes Eat Frogs. Hogs Eat Snakes. Men Eat Hogs =

Poem by Wallace Stevens

"Frogs Eat Butterflies. Snakes Eat Frogs. Hogs Eat Snakes. Men Eat Hogs" is a poem from Wallace Stevens's first book of poetry, Harmonium. It was first published in The Dial in 1922 and is therefore in the public domain.

Frogs Eat Butterflies. Snakes Eat Frogs. Hogs Eat Snakes. Men Eat Hogs

It is true that the rivers went nosing like swine,
Tugging at banks, until they seemed
Bland belly-sounds in somnolent troughs,

That the air was heavy with the breath of these swine,
The breath of turgid summer, and
Heavy with thunder's rattapallax,

That the man who erected this cabin, planted
This field, and tended it awhile,
Knew not the quirks of imagery,

That the hours of his indolent, arid days,
Grotesque with this nosing in banks,
This somnolence and rattapallax,

Seemed to suckle themselves on his arid being,
As the swine-like rivers suckled themselves
While they went seaward to the sea-mouths.

== Interpretation ==
This poem's title is one of those that rankled with Louis Untermeyer, but Stevens insisted on it in preference to the abbreviated "Frogs Eat Butterflies", which he wrote in a 1922 letter, "would have an affected appearance, which I should dislike". If "The Worms at Heaven's Gate" is about death, then "Frogs Eat Butterflies. Snakes Eat Frogs. Hogs Eat Snakes. Men Eat Hogs." is about aging.
