= The Jack-Rabbit =

Poem by Wallace Stevens

"The Jack-Rabbit" is a poem from Wallace Stevens's first book of poetry, Harmonium (1923).

== Overview ==
The Jack-Rabbit

In the morning,
The jack-rabbit sang to the Arkansaw.
He carolled in caracoles
On the feat sandbars.

The black man said,
"Now, grandmother,
Crochet me this buzzard
On your winding-sheet,
And do not forget his wry neck
After the winter."

The black man said,
"Look out, O caroller,
The entrails of the buzzard
Are rattling."

The jack-rabbit's joyful jig contrasts with the prospect of its demise, anticipated by the black man who invokes a symbol of death that applies both to his grandmother and her burial garment, and to the dancing jack-rabbit. Buttel views the black man's words as a fusion of the native folk tradition with the motif of sewing and embroidering from Jules Laforgue, a French Symbolist poet who was influenced by Walt Whitman and in turn influenced Stevens (as well as T. S. Eliot and Ezra Pound). Buttel notes that the buzzard appears frequently in native folk and humorous literature, and that Stevens uses it several times in his poems, "along with bantams, grackles, and turkey-cocks".
