= Explanation (poem) =

Poem by Wallace Stevens

"Explanation" is a poem from Wallace Stevens's first book of poetry, Harmonium (1923). It was first published in 1917, so it is in the public domain.

Explanation

Ach, Mutter,
This old, black dress,
I have been embroidering
French flowers on it.

Not by way of romance,
Here is nothing of the ideal,
Nein,
Nein.

It would have been different,
Liebchen,
If I had imagined myself,
In an orange gown,
Drifting through space,
Like a figure on the church-wall.

== Interpretation ==
Robert Buttel has indicated this poem may be an explanation of the difference between conventional decoration and artistic imagination, the latter represented, as Buttel proposes, by an allusion to Chagall and the otherworldly charm (a figure drifting through space) of his paintings.
