= The Ordinary Women =

Poem by Wallace Stevens

"The Ordinary Women" is a poem from Wallace Stevens's first book of poetry, Harmonium.

The Ordinary Women

Then from their poverty they rose,
From dry catarrhs, and to guitars
They flitted
Through the palace walls.

They flung monotony behind,
Turned from their want, and, nonchalant,
They crowded
The nocturnal halls.

The lacquered loges huddled there
Mumbled zay-zay and a-zay, a-zay.
The moonlight fubbed the girandoles.

And the cold dresses that they wore,
In the vapid haze of the window-bays,
Were tranquil
As they leaned and looked

From the window-sills at the alphabets,
At beta b and gamma g,
To study
The canting curlicues

Of heaven and of the heavenly script.
And there they read of marriage-bed.
Ti-lill-o!
And they read right long.

The gaunt guitarists on the strings
Rumbled a-day and a-day, a-day.
The moonlight
Rose on the beachy floors.

How explicit the coiffures became,
The diamond point, the sapphire point,
The sequins
Of the civil fans!

Insinuations of desire,
Puissant speech, alike in each,
Cried quittance
To the wickless halls.

Then from their poverty they rose,
From dry guitars, and to catarrhs
They flitted
Through the palace walls.

Opinion is divided about whether the poem expresses Stevens' distaste for romanticism in art, a "mordant satire...of all the things that other poems hold sacred"; or whether the poem is about "the refreshment that art, in its palace, gives to reality".

In support of the ironic reading, the stanza that includes the inscrutable line "Ti-lill-o!" suggests insipid observers of vulgar soap-opera art. The surrounding stanzas find the women bathed in silly moonlight that "fubs the girandoles", leaning out from "the vapid haze of the window-bays", listening to a guitarist who drones on and on—the whole proceedings rendered "faintly or overtly repellent". Milton J. Bates speaks of the "Ti-lill-o" of titillation, the guitars as Hollywood fantasies, "beta b and gamma g" as a love scene between a boy and a girl, the women as leading humdrum and sexually unfulfilled lives.

Stevens' use of the verb "to fub" may be an interpretive choice-point. If that use isn't taken as ironically dismissing the romantic aura surrounding moonlight's effect on candelabras, there is an opening for the "refreshment of reality" reading favored by Buttel as well as Sukenick. "Presumably", Buttel writes, "the women, having read the 'heavenly script' in their visit to the palace of art, return to reality renewed, 'Puissant' of speech and filled with 'Insinuations of desire'".

In 1982, Los Angeles art rock band The Fibonaccis recorded a spoken word rendition of "The Ordinary Women" set to music on their EP (fi'-bo-na'-chez).
