= Two Figures in Dense Violet Night =

Poem by Wallace Stevens

"Two Figures in Dense Violet Night" is a poem from Wallace Stevens's first book of poetry, Harmonium. It was first published in 1923. Only its first stanza is quoted here.

Two Figures in Dense Violet Night

I had as lief be embraced by the porter at the hotel
As to get no more from the moonlight
Than your moist hand.
.
.
.
.

== Interpretation ==
Buttel reads the poem as about the "humorous disparity between gauche male and suave female". But it can also be read as neither humorous nor gender-specific, but rather as a meditation on the lover's otherness or `alterity'. The former assimilates it to such poems as "Plot Against The Giant", the latter to such as "Le Monocle De Mon Oncle". Related to the latter reading is the suggestion that the poem addresses the relationship of a poet to the reader, who is enjoined to match the poet's imaginative response to the world.

Stevens endows the poem with pace by use of the imperative mood.
