= The Wind Shifts =

Poem by Wallace Stevens

"The Wind Shifts" is a poem from Wallace Stevens's first book of poetry, Harmonium. It was first published in 1917, so it is in the public domain.

The Wind Shifts

This is how the wind shifts:
Like the thoughts of an old human,
Who still thinks eagerly
And despairingly.
The wind shifts like this:
Like a human without illusions,
Who still feels irrational things within her.
The wind shifts like this:
Like humans approaching proudly,
Like humans approaching angrily.
This is how the wind shifts:
Like a human, heavy and heavy,
Who does not care.

== Interpretation ==
"The wind shifts" explains why John Gould Fletcher detected a poet out of tune with life and with his surroundings. (See the main Harmonium essay.)

Buttel cites this poem as an example of Stevens's mastery of repetition within free verse. The repetition of "the wind shifts" underscores the associated human feelings, and "heavy and heavy" adds to the effect of leaden monotony.
