= Bantam in Pine-Woods =

Poem by Wallace Stevens

"Bantams in Pine-Woods" is a poem from Wallace Stevens's first book of poetry, Harmonium. It was first published in 1922 in the poetry journal Dial, along with five other poems, all under the title "Revue." It is in the public domain.

Bantams in Pine-Woods

Chieftain Iffucan of Azcan in caftan
Of tan with henna hackles, halt!

Damned universal cock, as if the sun
Was blackamoor to bear your blazing tail.

Fat! Fat! Fat! Fat! I am the personal.
Your world is you. I am my world.

You ten-foot poet among inchlings. Fat!
Begone! An inchling bristles in these pines,

Bristles, and points their Appalachian tangs,
And fears not portly Azcan nor his hoos.

== Interpretation ==
This poem can be read as a declaration of independence for American poetry. The new world's "inchling" poets are defiant towards the traditional literary canon, and particularly defiant against the unnamed, arrogant, self-appointed gatekeeper of literary tradition; they are confident instead in their own free powers of innovation in the New World. The poem can be compared to "The Paltry Nude Starts on a Spring Voyage" on Helen Vendler's interpretation of it as an expression of confidence in new American art. In this reading, Chieftain Iffucan represents the canon, making a claim of universality and a privileged access to inspiration that is challenged by the Appalachian inchlings. The richness of tradition is conceded ("Fat!...."), but it is then relativized ("Your world is you").
