= Ploughing on Sunday =

Poem by Wallace Stevens

"Ploughing on Sunday" is a poem from Wallace Stevens's first book of poetry, Harmonium (1923). First published in 1919, it is now in the public domain.

Ploughing on Sunday

The white cock's tail
Tosses in the wind.
The turkey-cock's tail
Glitters in the sun.

Water in the fields.
The wind pours down.
The feathers flare
And bluster in the wind.

Remus, blow your horn!
I'm ploughing on Sunday,
Ploughing North America.
Blow your horn!

Tum-ti-tum,
Ti-tum-tum-tum!
The turkey-cock's tail
Spreads to the sun.

The white cock's tail
Streams to the moon.
Water in the fields.
The wind pours down.

Interpretations of this poem have been both strictly metaphorical and philosophical. At one extreme is the suggestion that the poem is about the sexual act. The Oxford English Dictionary recognizes a sense in which "to plough" means to have sexual intercourse. Its most recent citation for this use is "P. CAREY Jack Maggs (1998) xlvi. 167 Edward Constable had been..reamed, rogered, ploughed by Henry Phipps so [that] he could barely walk straight to the table."

A different interpretation by Helen Vendler suggests that Stevens writes about the experience of being a poet, "There, while his docile neighbors troop off to church, the poet, violating the Sabbath, blasphemously harnesses his team to plough and takes to the fields, full of indiscriminate joy in the sun and wind alike..."

At a philosophical extreme is the argument that the poem is about artists in North America imaginatively cultivating the reality of the New World with exuberant disregard for old European strictures. In this regard, it is comparable to "The Paltry Nude Starts on a Spring Voyage" which Vendler interprets as being about "new American art". The latter readings acknowledge the symbolism of the sun as representing reality, the moon imagination.

Stevens described the poem as a "fanfaronnade" and was accustomed to listening to Dvořák, This is consistent with reading "Ploughing on Sunday" as a poetic fanfaronnade, a parallel to Dvořák's Symphony Number 9 ("From the New World"). This fits well with the more philosophically-driven reading which also easily harmonizes with the references to North America and Remus (as an allusion to the founding of Rome), whereas alternate readings struggle on these points. Environmentalists might agree that North America has been "rogered" by immigration and industrial development but it's unlikely Stevens had that in mind. And if the poem were simply about the poet's joyfully exulting in his powers, why does North America (and a North American gamebird) provide the context for that, rather than any other geographical setting, such as Hartford, Connecticut, or the Western Hemisphere?

The Stevenses observed the old custom of refraining from physical labor on Sundays, not even cooking. This will be disturbing for those who analyze poetry by reference to biography; it would pose a problem for Vendler's interpretation.

Buttel detects the influence of Walt Whitman in the poem's expansive wit, exaggeration and slap at the blue laws. He also sees in the poem Stevens's awareness of rural and frontier America and, "in Remus, to the Negroes and other reminders of the native folk tradition."
