= Fabliau of Florida =

Poem by Wallace Stevens

"Fabliau of Florida" is a poem in Wallace Stevens's first book of poetry, Harmonium.

Fabliau of Florida

Barque of phosphor
On the palmy beach,

Move outward into heaven,
Into the alabasters
And night blues.

Foam and cloud are one.
Sultry moon-monsters
Are dissolving.

Fill your black hull
With white moonlight.

There will never be an end
To this droning of the surf.

== Interpretation ==
In a letter written in 1939, Stevens says that he has always liked this poem, not because of its sense, "because it does not have a great deal of sense", but because of "the feeling of the words and the reaction and images that the words create".

Mark Strand asserts that the poem, though seemingly about the liminal space between sea and shore, is really about the liminal space between poem and reality. He suggests that this becomes clear once one appreciates the pun on the first and last words of the poem, namely "barque" and "surf".

The poem may be compared to "Infanta Marina", which similarly explores dissolution of boundaries in nature. Here the boundaries are beach and heaven, foam and cloud.
