= Last Looks at the Lilacs =

Poem by Wallace Stevens

"Last Looks at the Lilacs" is a poem from Wallace Stevens's first book of poetry, Harmonium. It was first published in 1923 (in Secession 4, January).

Last Looks at the Lilacs

To what good, in the alleys of the lilacs,
O caliper, do you scratch your buttocks
And tell the divine ingenue, your companion,
That this bloom is the bloom of soap
And this fragrance the fragrance of vegetal?

Do you suppose that she cares a tick,
In this hymeneal air, what it is
That marries her innocence thus,
So that her nakedness is near,
Or that she will pause at scurrilous words?

Poor buffo! Look at the lavender
And look your last and look steadily,
And say how it comes that you see
Nothing but trash and that you no longer feel
Her body quivering in the Floréal

Toward the cool night and its fantastic star,
Prime paramour and belted paragon,
Well-booted, rugged, arrogantly male,
Patron and imager of the gold Don John,
Who will embrace her before summer comes.

Robert Buttel compares this poem to "The Plot Against the Giant" as concerning the humorous disparity between gauche male and suave female. Robert A. Wilson makes a surprisingly plausible case (in a single-page article in The Wallace Stevens Journal, complete with an image of the label from a bottle of "Lilac Vegetal" after-shave lotion) for a connection between the poem and Stevens's experience at a barber shop.

Caliper'd reason, measuring everything but appreciating nothing, is contrasted unfavorably with well-booted imagination, as in Whitman's "When Lilacs Last in the Door-yard Bloom'd" or indeed the very poem under discussion. Lilacs can be connected to the fragrance of vegetal or to a cool night's fantastic star, but Stevens favors the latter and the final stanza shows why. Cook reports that "lilacs do not make Stevens happy" and reads the poem as blunt and atypical, comparing it to some of the more strained effects in The Comedian as the Letter C.
