= O Florida, Venereal Soil =

Poem by Wallace Stevens

"O Florida, Venereal Soil" is a poem from Wallace Stevens's first book of poetry, Harmonium. It was first published in the journal Dial, volume 73, July 1922, and is therefore in the public domain.

O Florida, Venereal Soil

A few things for themselves,
Convolvulus and coral,
Buzzards and live-moss,
Tiestas from the keys,
A few things for themselves,
Florida, venereal soil,
Disclose to the lover.

The dreadful sundry of this world,
The Cuban, Polodowsky,
The Mexican women,
The negro undertaker
Killing the time between corpses
Fishing for crayfish...
Virgin of boorish births,

Swiftly in the nights,
In the porches of Key West,
Behind the bougainvilleas,
After the guitar is asleep,
Lasciviously as the wind,
You come tormenting,
Insatiable,

When you might sit,
A scholar of darkness,
Sequestered over the sea,
Wearing a clear tiara
Of red and blue and red,
Sparkling, solitary, still,
In the high sea-shadow.

Donna, donna, dark,
Stooping in indigo gown
And cloudy constellations,
Conceal yourself or disclose
Fewest things to the lover ---
A hand that bears a thick-leaved fruit,
A pungent bloom against your shade.

The literary critic Robert Buttel interprets the poem as continuous with Baudelaire's sense of the opposition between the corruptibility of the flesh and the perfection of an ideal world. The "few things for themselves" that Stevens lists in the first stanza are not philosophical generics like Aristotle's conception of what's worth doing for its own sake (philosophy) or Hobbes's list of appetitive desires that motivate all human beings. Stevens's list rather is highly specific and opaque to the reader whose imagination may not be piqued by buzzards, etc. One has to look beyond this opacity to whatever piques one's imagination, however quirky that may be to others. The same holds true for the "dreadful sundry of this world" listed in the second stanza. The poem is about Stevens's subjective response to Florida, and he doesn't do any generalizing so as to share an abstract content with the reader.

The word "venereal" refers to Venus, not to the sexual disease, as in Milton's "venereal trains" (Milton, Samson Agonistes, 533). She sometimes carries symbolically fertile fruit in her hand.

However much the poet may be distracted by lascivious particulars, he does indeed want particulars: A hand that bears a thick-leaved fruit, A pungent bloom against donna's shade. This insistence on particularity is a familiar theme in Stevens. (See his treatment of beauty in "Peter Quince at the Clavier", for example.) Bates reads the poem as Stevens's wish that Florida "were less the harlot and more the sequestered inamorata". (His donna may be compared to the princess of the sea in "Infanta Marina".)

Buttel classifies it as one of the later poems in Harmonium, displaying "an extravagance of conception and an energy of language and tone that approach the violences of imagination that Stevens sought but had not found in the earlier poems." He credits these later poems with establishing "an over-all development" in the book.
