= The Plot Against the Giant =

Poem by Wallace Stevens

"The Plot Against the Giant" is a poem from Wallace Stevens's first book of poetry, Harmonium. It was first published in 1917, so it is in the public domain.

The Plot Against the Giant

First Girl

When this yokel comes maundering,
Whetting his hacker,
I shall run before him,
Diffusing the civilest odors
Out of geraniums and unsmelled flowers.
It will check him.

Second Girl

I shall run before him,
Arching cloths besprinkled with colors
As small as fish-eggs.
The threads
Will abash him.

Third Girl

Oh, la...le pauvre!
I shall run before him,
With a curious puffing.
He will bend his ear then.
I shall whisper
Heavenly labials in a world of gutturals.
It will undo him.

Stevens was called "the Giant" in his Harvard days, and he confessed in an interview a year before his death that "[i]n my younger days I liked girls. But let's not stress that. I have a wife." The mumbling giant, perhaps a lumberjack sharpening his axe, may be compared to the bucks whose course is changed by the firecat poet in "Earthy Anecdote", here replaced by three girls. The poet challenges and changes the ordinary. The yokel may be checked, abashed, and undone. Maybe he is changed.

The poem's theme of beguiling female and bumbling male can be compared to "Last Looks at the Lilacs" and "Two Figures in Dense Violet Night".

Buttel detects a hint of the work of the Pointillists in the "cloths besprinkled with colors / As small as fish eggs."
