= The Weeping Burgher =

Poem by Wallace Stevens

"The Weeping Burgher" is a poem from Wallace Stevens's first book of poetry, Harmonium. Originally published in 1919, it is in the public domain.

The Weeping Burgher

It is with a strange malice
That I distort the world.

Ah! that ill humors
Should mask as white girls.
And ah! that Scaramouche
Should have a black barouche.

The sorry verities!
Yet in excess, continual,
There is cure of sorrow.

Permit that if as ghost I come
Among the people burning in me still,
I come as belle design
Of foppish line.

And I, then, tortured for old speech,
A white of wildly woven rings;
I, weeping in a calcined heart,
My hands such sharp, imagined things.

== Interpretation ==
According to a reading that naively equates the poem's speaker with the poet, Stevens confesses to a strange malice that distorts the world as given by the poems in Harmonium, masking ill humors and poses. The masks are excesses that are his poetic cure for sorrow. The poet presents himself to the reader as a ghost but an appealingly foppish ghost of "belle design", quite different from the weeping burgher who crafted the artifice. The poem, within the collection Harmonium, immediately follows "The Place of the Solitaires" with which it may be instructively compared. The hands that do the writing are now seen as "sharp, imagined things" responsible for strangely malicious distortions.

Bates recounts the following anecdote.

Two years after "The Weeping Burgher" appeared in [the journal] Poetry, Genevieve Taggard told Stevens of the rumor that his poems were "hideous ghosts" of himself, to which he replied, "It may be."

See Marianne Moore's comment about the "shadow of acrimonious, unprovoked contumely" that she detected in Harmonium.
