= Of the Surface of Things =

Poem by Wallace Stevens

"Of the Surface of Things" is a poem from Wallace Stevens's first book of poetry, Harmonium (1923). It was first published in 1919, so it is in the public domain.

Of the Surface of Things

I
In my room, the world is beyond my understanding;
But when I walk I see that it consists of three or four
hills and a cloud.

II
From my balcony, I survey the yellow air,
Reading where I have written,
"The spring is like a belle undressing."

III
The gold tree is blue.
The singer has pulled his cloak over his head.
The moon is in the folds of the cloak.

The literary critic Robert Buttel, author of Wallace Stevens: The Making of Harmonium (1967), reads the poem as an example of Stevens's "anti-poetic" approach to poetry, i.e., approaching it in an offhand way. He finds that the prose rhythms of the first stanza contrast strikingly with the metrical regularity of the line about the belle undressing. That line is so delicately honest that it almost had to be quoted in order to give the speaker some distance from it. The sturdy epistemic modesty of the first stanza contrasts with the intense opacity of the final stanza. Is it saying that the real tree basks in the illumination of imagination? Is the singer a poet like Walt Whitman, who pushes through what is prosaic ("three or four hills and a cloud") or beyond his understanding, in order to give full vent to his imagination in, for instance, "Song of Myself"?

Milton Bates speculates that the "cloak" is probably the cloud and the "singer" one of the hills.

The poem can also be read as one of Stevens's many commentaries on the relation of imagination to reality: the poet's previously written line about the belle undressing (the imagination's formulation) contrasts with the actual scene portrayed in the first part of the poem. To the imagination the color of a tree is easily transformed. The "singer" in the penultimate line is, by such a reading, the poet who obscures the real world by pulling the cloak of his imagination over his head, enabling him to see the Moon in its folds.
