= The Virgin Carrying a Lantern =

Poem by Wallace Stevens

"The Virgin Carrying a Lantern" is a poem from Wallace Stevens's first book of poetry, Harmonium (1923). It was one of the few Harmonium poems first published in that volume.

The Virgin Carrying a Lantern

There are no bears among the roses,
Only a negress who supposes
Things false and wrong

About the lantern of the beauty
Who walks, there, as a farewell duty,
Walks long and long.

The pity that her pious egress
Should fill the vigil of a negress
With heat so strong!

== Interpretation ==
This poem illustrates Edmund Wilson's maxim about reading Stevens, that even when you do not know what he is saying, you know that he is saying it well. It also illustrates a variant, that even when you have qualms about what he is saying, you know that he is saying it well. The image of the virgin carrying a lantern is crisp, contributing to a well wrought miniature. The role for the negress may be a racist stereotype. It is certainly more likely to be seen as such today than in 1923. Stevens surely meant it to be a playful poem, as the facile rhyme indicates.

Frank Doggett reads the poem as about the tension between conscious and unconscious, personified by the virgin and the negress respectively. "The virgin is the consciousness fulfulling its conventional roles by the light of its intelligence, the lantern," he writes, whereas the negress is the unconscious libido hidden among the flowers of sentiment, representing "the subliminal erotic life beneath the pieties and traditional obligations of the roles taken by the consciousness." Other readers may doubt that such a slight poem can bear this heavy load of Freudian theory.
