= The Load of Sugar-Cane =

Poem by Wallace Stevens

"The Load Of Sugar-Cane" is a poem from Wallace Stevens's first book of poetry, Harmonium.

The Load Of Sugar-Cane

The going of the glade-boat
Is like water flowing;

Like water flowing
Through the green saw-grass
Under the rainbows;

Under the rainbows
That are like birds,
Turning, bedizened,

While the wind still whistles
As kildeer do,

When they rise
At the red turban
Of the boatman.

In her review of Harmonium Marianne Moore picks out "The Load of Sugar-Cane" for praise because it achieves its splendor cumulatively. It illustrates an element of his craft, his "refraining for fear of impairing [a poem's] litheness of contour, from overelaborating felicities inherent in a subject." The red turban of the boatman in the final stanza is a little surprise, not what one would expect in the evidently Floridian everglades. Stevens is upsetting easy traditional expectations in this little experiment.
