= To the One of Fictive Music =

Poem by Wallace Stevens

"To the One of Fictive Music" is a poem from Wallace Stevens's first book of poetry, Harmonium. First published in 1922, it is in the public domain.

To the One of Fictive Music

Sister and mother and diviner love,
And of the sisterhood of the living dead
Most near, most clear, and of the clearest bloom,
And of the fragrant mothers the most dear
And queen, and of diviner love the day
And flame and summer and sweet fire, no thread
Of cloudy silver sprinkles in your gown
Its venom of renown, and on your head
No crown is simpler than the simple hair.

Now, of the music summoned by the birth
That separates us from the wind and sea,
Yet leaves us in them, until earth becomes,
By being so much of the things we are,
Gross effigy and simulacrum, none
Gives motion to perfection more serene
Than yours, out of our imperfections wrought,
Most rare, or ever of more kindred air
In the laborious weaving that you wear.

For so retentive of themselves are men
That music is intensest which proclaims
The near, the clear, and vaunts the clearest bloom,
And of all the vigils musing the obscure,
That apprehends the most which sees and names,
As in your name, an image that is sure,
Among the arrant spices of the sun,
O bough and bush and scented vine, in whom
We give ourselves our likest issuance.

Yet not too like, yet not so like to be
Too near, too clear, saving a little to endow
Our feigning with the strange unlike, whence springs
The difference that heavenly pity brings.
For this, musician, in your girdle fixed
Bear other perfumes. On your pale head wear
A band entwining, set with fatal stones.
Unreal, give back to us what once you gave:
The imagination that we spurned and crave.

== Interpretation ==
Stevens, the musical imagist, invokes the muse of poetry for "an image that is sure" in a kind of music that "gives motion to perfection more serene" than other forms of music summoned by the human condition. The poet aims at a kind of simplicity and spurns "the venom of renown." The poet's muse might be compared in these respects to Socrates' philosophical muse. Socrates condemned the sophists and Stevens' queen rejects vices analogous to theirs in poetry. The dim view of renown poetically reinforces the Adagia dictum: "Poetry is, (and should be,) for the poet, a source of pleasure and satisfaction, not a source of honors."

The use of the word 'near' is not idiosyncratic but purposeful. "Poetry is not personal," as Stevens writes in Adagia. And the clearness is not too clear. The poet's musician resists the intellect, "saving a little to endow our feignings with the strange unlike." This is an expression of the Adagia thesis that poetry must resist the intelligence almost successfully.

The poem concludes with a reminder of the musical imagist's serious purpose. The poetic musician wears a band "set with fatal stones." None of the foregoing proposes an identification of the poem's addressee (certainly not Socrates), a necessary first step in a defensible interpretation.
