= Theory (poem) =

Poem by Wallace Stevens

"Theory" is a poem from Wallace Stevens's first book of poetry, Harmonium. It was first published in 1917, and is in the public domain.

Theory

I am what is around me.

Women understand this.
One is not duchess
A hundred yards from a carriage.

These, then are portraits:
A black vestibule;
A high bed sheltered by curtains.

These are merely instances.

== Interpretation ==
Buttel interprets the poem as one of Stevens's attempts to approach the rhythms of prose, as part of a strategic understatement that moves into a poem in an offhand, 'anti-poetic' way. He sees that the instances must carry the strength of the theory, but he says nothing about how to understand theory in Stevens's specific sense, and nothing about what strength amounts to in this context.

Compare the opening line to Byron's assertion in the first lines of Canto III, Stanza LXXII of Childe Harold's Pilgrimage: "I live not in myself, but I become / Portion of that around me."
