= Tattoo (poem) =

Poem from Wallace Stevens's first book of poetry, Harmonium

"Tattoo" is a poem from Wallace Stevens's first book of poetry, Harmonium. It was originally published in 1916, so it is in the public domain. Librivox has made the poem available in voice recording in its The Complete Public Domain Poems of Wallace Stevens.

Tattoo

The light is like a spider.
It crawls over the water.
It crawls over the edges of the snow.
It crawls under your eyelids
And spreads its webs there—
Its two webs.

The webs of your eyes
Are fastened
To the flesh and bones of you
As to rafters or grass.

There are filaments of your eyes
On the surface of the water
And in the edges of the snow.

== Interpretation ==
Buttel detects Imagistic technique in the poem's Whitman-like naming of physical details. In response to nature, man's natural architecture of flesh and bones has developed so as to catch nature's beauty. We are tattoo'd by it, but equally we tattoo nature with human sensibility.
