= Earthy Anecdote =

Poem by Wallace Stevens

"Earthy Anecdote" is the first poem in Wallace Stevens' first book of poetry Harmonium (1923). The passage of a group of "bucks" is impeded by a "firecat". There is little consensus about its meaning, even after 100 years of critical attention, and Stevens himself refused to provide one. On the surface, his poem describes a herd of deer that stampede ("clatter") left and right in order to avoid a lurking wildcat, who pounces back and forth in front of them, and afterwards (presumably after catching and eating one, or maybe not) closes its eyes and sleeps.

== Local Color ==
According to Martha Strom, "Stevens locates the bucks in Oklahoma, which firmly situates the poem in the 'local' school of writing, but he imbues the localist donnée—a particular landscape, some bucks, and a cat in Oklahoma—with the motion of his imagination, and the flat 'local' scene acquires texture and life". When Stevens was a student at Harvard he was interested in the Local Color school of American writing, but that interest grew into a lifelong philosophical study of imagination and reality and how their intersection could lead to poetry.
