= Anecdote of Canna =

Poem by Wallace Stevens

"Anecdote of Canna" is a poem from Wallace Stevens's first book of poetry, Harmonium (1923).

Anecdote of Canna

Huge are the canna in the dreams of
X, the mighty thought, the mighty man.
They fill the terrace of his capitol.

His thought sleeps not. Yet thought that wakes
In sleep may never meet another thought
Or thing....Now day-break comes...

X promenades the dewy stones,
Observes the canna with a clinging eye,
Observes and then continues to observe.

== Interpretation ==
Canna is a genus of 10 species of flowering plants. In the poem's legerdemain the cryptic middle stanza conceals the sleight of hand. Poor X wakes in his sleep ("Now day-break comes") and consequently his eye clings to the canna forever. The cleverness of the poem links it to "The Worms at Heaven's Gate". The poetic conceit here may be contrasted with Descartes' philosophical proposition that a person must always be thinking when asleep, on pain of ceasing to exist. Day-dreaming, sleep-walking, catatonic X is fixated upon the showy canna that fill the terrace of his capitol, his consciousness.

Buttel forgoes this interpretation in favor of the idea that the poem celebrates the poetic counterpart of a painter's "primitive eye". Such poets would achieve what Monet and the Impressionists desired, recovering from blindness and seeing the world "with utmost clarity, without preconceptions". "They would be like X in Stevens' 'Anecdote of Canna'", Buttel writes, "who at daybreak 'Observes the Canna with a clinging eye,' as though for the first time".

Neither interpretation, however, identifies who X is, the starting point of a reading of the poem which does more than merely scratch the surface. In the poem, "X" is identified merely as a 'mighty man' with a 'mighty thought'.
