= Of Heaven Considered as a Tomb =

Poem by Wallace Stevens

"Of Heaven Considered as a Tomb" is a poem from Wallace Stevens's first book of poetry, Harmonium (1923). It was first published in 1921, so it is in the public domain.

Of Heaven Considered as a Tomb

What word have you, interpreters, of men
Who in the tomb of heaven walk by night,
The darkened ghosts of our old comedy?
Do they believe they range the gusty cold,
With lanterns borne aloft to light the way,
Freemen of death, about and still about
To find whatever they seek? Or does
That burial, pillared up each day as porte
And spiritous passage into nothingness,
Foretell each night the one abysmal night
When the host shall no more wander, nor the light
Of the steadfast lanterns creep across the dark?
Make hue among the dark comedians,
Halloo them in the topmost distances
For answer from their icy Élysée.

This is a poem about the other side of death, optimistically hallooing the departed ("the darkened ghosts") for news that they are still "about and still about", pessimistically anticipating that the burials that occur each day are a portal into nothingness, "the one abysmal night". It may be compared with "The Worms at Heaven's Gate", which presents death more naturalistically.

That interpretation plays a language game, but not the one Stevens invites readers to play by asking "What word have you, interpreters...?"
