= Anecdote of the Prince of Peacocks =

Poem by Wallace Stevens

"Anecdote of the Prince of Peacocks" is a poem from Wallace Stevens's first book of poetry, Harmonium (1923). It was one of the few Harmonium poems first published in that volume, so it is still under copyright. However, it is quoted here as justified by Fair use to facilitate scholarly commentary.

Anecdote of the Prince of Peacocks

In the moonlight
I met Berserk,
In the moonlight
On the bushy plain.
Oh, sharp he was
As the sleepless!

And, "Why are you red
In this milky blue?"
I said.

"Why sun-colored,
As if awake
In the midst of sleep?"

"You that wander,"
So he said,
"On the bushy plain,
Forget so soon.
But I set my traps
In the midst of dreams."

I knew from this
That the blue ground
Was full of blocks
And blocking steel.
I knew the dread
Of the bushy plain,

And the beauty
Of the moonlight
Falling there,
Falling
As sleep falls
In the innocent air.

== Interpretation ==
The poem marks Stevens's realization that the life of the imagination is more complex and fraught with peril than he had once supposed.

Robert Buttel is impressed by an "eerie collocation of colors" which contributes to the "disturbing effect of the invasion of the world of moonlight and dream by Berserk, who personifies the violence of day."

Vendler understands the poem as Stevens meeting his own potential madness. The prince of peacocks, the poet, meets Berserk, who will not be evaded even in dreams. She thinks that the initial promise of the poem, the brutal encounter between the prince and Berserk, is dissipated in the final stanza, "an unrewarding ending".

It may be that Vendler understands the dread in the penultimate stanza to take as its object only the bushy plain. The scope of the dread is narrow. But if the scope is broad, encompassing the final stanza, then the prince knows the dread of the beauty of the moonlight. The eeriness that Buttel mentioned continues to the end of the poem. There isn't a retreat from brutality to incantation, as Vendler sees it, but rather the brutality of the blocks and blocking steel extends into the final stanza.

Compare "The Public Square" for the shared architectural motif.
