= Sea Surface Full of Clouds =

Poem by Wallace Stevens

"Sea Surface full of Clouds" is a poem from the second, 1931, edition of Wallace Stevens's first book of poetry, Harmonium. It was first published in 1924, so it is restricted by copyright. However, brief parts of it are quoted here as fair use, and the whole poem is available elsewhere on the Internet.

== Overview ==
Sea Surface full of Clouds

III

In that November off Tehuantepec,
The slopping of the sea grew still one night
And a pale silver patterned on the deck

And made one think of porcelain chocolate
And pied umbrellas. An uncertain green,
Piano-polished, held the tranced machine

Of ocean, as a prelude holds and holds,
Who, seeing silver petals of white blooms
Unfolding in the water, feeling sure

Of the milk within the saltiest spurge, heard, then,
The sea unfolding in the sunken clouds?
Oh! C'était mon extase et mon amour.

So deeply sunken were they that the shrouds,
The shrouding shadows, made the petals black
Until the rolling heaven made them blue,

A blue beyond the rainy hyacinth,
And smiting the crevasses of the leaves
Deluged the ocean with a sapphire blue.

V
.
.
.

The sovereign clouds came clustering. The conch
Of loyal conjuration trumped. The wind
Of green blooms turning crisped the motley hue

To clearing opalescence. Then the sea
And heaven rolled as one and from the two
Came fresh transfigurings of freshest blue.

The poem comprises five sections, each of six tercets, describing the same seascape as viewed from the deck of a ship. Each section repeats the description in different terms but uses recurring words (slopping, chocolate, umbrellas, green, blooms, etc.) and often the same syntax. In each section the last line of the fourth tercet is written in French. Rhymes are used in somewhat changing patterns, but the final line of each section always rhymes with the final line of the preceding tercet. Essentially the poem is structured as a set of variations on a theme.

Section III, quoted here, figures in Joan Richardson's reading of "Sea Surface" as having Stevens's sexuality as its "true subject". The prelude describes ("most hermetically") the period preceding sexual climax. The reference to a piano is explained by the fact that his mother and his wife, Elsie, played the piano. "For him, the piano and other keyboard instruments are always attached to something magical connected with the idea of beauty and the allure of the female, as, for example, in "Peter Quince at the Clavier," Richardson writes, " Accordingly, the machine of ocean, his projection, is now `tranced,' carried away by the rapture of the `uncertain green... as a prelude holds and holds."

Richardson continues:

He imaginatively records both his sensations and those of his wife. The female is felt by him as "silver petals of white blooms/ Unfolding in the water," and he, in his maleness, is "feeling sure/ of the milk within the saltiest spurge." He goes on to express the feelings of both of them throughout this section and in part of the next. The climax itself is described as, "The sea unfolding in the sunken clouds/ Oh! [marking the surprise of the moment of climax] C'était mon extase et mon amour."

Richardson explicitly invokes Stevens's distinction between the true subject of a poem and the poetry of the subject, in order to justify a reading that dwells on what she takes to be the true subject. She writes,

In closing, I offer the following observations taken from "The Irrational Element in Poetry:" "One is always writing about two things at the same time in poetry and it is this that produces the tension characteristic of poetry. One is the true subject and the other is the poetry of the subject. The difficulty of sticking to the true subject, when it is the poetry of the subject that is paramount in one's mind, need only be mentioned to be understood."

Buttel does not draw the distinction, but he implicitly focuses on the poetry of the subject, the "Poetry of sky and sea" in the concluding two stanzas, discussing not deep psychology but rather the syntactical and semantic features of Stevens's style.

The verse moves fluently from line to line, and the variations intensify the exultation in the open-air vividness and splendor of the seascape and skyscape....the combination of accents and alliteration in "clouds came clustering," with "came" in this context picking up a stress, heightens the impressiveness and drama produced by the image of the "sovereign" cloud masses "clustering" -- just the right word in meaning and sound -- into transitory form. The metrical regularity of the following sentence, abetted by the repetition of sound in "conch" and "conjuration," contributes to the majestic authority of the note sounded by Triton. The suspended moment of turning is caught in the hovering emphasis on "green blooms turning," even though the long spondee adds an extra accent to the line; and this prepares for the immense satisfactionn of "clearing opalescence" -- the jewel-like iridescence dissolving into an instant of transfiguring clarity. Such effects lead up to the triumphant finality of the concluding line, where the partial stress on "Came" and the accents on the syllables beginning with f heighten the finality. The series of unstressed syllables in the penultimate foot not only increases the force of "freshest" but also helps to convey the ongoing quality of the transfigurations which are not static, even at the moment when poetic insight draws heaven and sea into a unity.

Buttel's foregrounding of Stevens's craftsmanship, especially with reference to syntactic and semantic innovation, is also the approach favored by Helen Vendler and those inspired by her scholarship. About "Sea Surface Full of Clouds", she writes, "in his witty moments, Stevens practices legerdemain with the world's `reality' and produces a fantasia of shifting possibles, the brilliant changes of `Sea Surface Full of Clouds'." Significantly, this reference occurs in the midst of a long discussion of Stevens's use of grammatical particles like "if" and "as if" in order to achieve the effect of "something half-glimpsed, half-seen, and that is, finally, what Stevens achieves over and over: if he has a dogma, it is the dogma of the shadowy, the ephemeral, the barely perceived, the iridescent."
