= The Apostrophe to Vincentine =

Poem by Wallace Stevens

"The Apostrophe to Vincentine" is a poem from Wallace Stevens's first book of poetry, Harmonium (1923). It was first published before 1923 and is therefore in the public domain according to Librivox.

The Apostrophe of Vincentine

I
I figured you as nude between
Monotonous earth and dark blue sky.
It made you seem so small and lean
And nameless,
Heavenly Vincentine.

II
I saw you then, as warm as flesh,
Brunette,
But yet not too brunette,
As warm, as clean.
Your dress was green,
Was whited green,
Green Vincentine.

III
Then you came walking,
In a group
Of human others,
Voluble.
Yes: you came walking,
Vincentine.
Yes: you came talking.

IV
And what I knew you felt
Came then.
Monotonous earth I saw become
Illimitable spheres of you,
And that white animal, so lean,
Turned Vincentine,
Turned heavenly Vincentine,
And that white animal, so lean,
Turned heavenly, heavenly Vincentine.

== Interpretation ==
Stevens's conflicted idealization of women in poems like "Vincentine" may not be to everyone's taste, but the poem can be appreciated as a remarkable kind of love poem as well as a study about his recurrent theme of transforming the world through imagination: the animal Vincentine, turned heavenly. She is Stevens's "unaccommodated object of desire before she has been clothed in the beauty of fantasy", according to Vendler.

Buttel helpfully draws attention to the line "Was whited green", which startles the reader, "through a verbal approximation of painting technique, into a vivid mental recognition—the object realized in art". He presents this as a device that Stevens often uses to clarify our vision, indirectly evoking the actual "by causing us to reflect on the resemblances between it and the visual and tactile qualities of paintings".

Buttel also compares the poem to "Peter Quince at the Clavier" and detects the influence of Stéphane Mallarmé, even suggesting that the phrase "white animal" derives from Mallarmé's "blancheur animale" in "L'Après-Midi d'un Faune". He sees Vincentine as giving profound meaning to Earth through her perfection, but not quite a fully realized deity of both earth and heaven.

For Vendler this lack of full realization is the point: "Brutality and apotheosis end in stalemate." The white animal and the transfigured woman (brunette, dressed, walking, talking, feeling) remain in a problematic relation. "There is no diction appropriate to both."
