= Nomad Exquisite =

Poem by Wallace Stevens

Nomad Exquisite is a poem by Wallace Stevens, originally published in Harmonium in 1923.

The 14-line, three-stanza poem does not follow a regular rhyme scheme or have a definitive meter, but relies heavily on repeating sounds— especially alliterative F's and G's. The speaker is unknown until the last stanza, appearing as a "me" out of which "forms" are flung.
