= Nuances of a Theme by Williams =

Poem by Wallace Stevens

"Nuances of a Theme by Williams" is a poem from Wallace Stevens's first book of poetry, Harmonium.

Nuances of a Theme by Williams

It's a strange courage
You give me, ancient star:

Shine alone in the sunrise
toward which you lend no part!

I

Shine alone, shine nakedly, shine like bronze
that reflects neither my face nor any inner part
of my being, shine like fire, that mirrors nothing.

II

Lend no part to any humanity that suffuses
you in its own light.
Be not chimera of morning,
Half-man, half-star.
Be not an intelligence,
Like a widow's bird
Or an old horse.

The italicized first lines make up a poem, "El Hombre", by Stevens' modernist contemporary William Carlos Williams. The poem was first published in Little Review 5 (1918).
