= Disillusionment of Ten O'Clock =

Poem by Wallace Stevens

"Disillusionment of Ten O'Clock" is a poem from Wallace Stevens's first book of poetry, Harmonium. First published in 1915, it is in the public domain.

Disillusionment of Ten O'Clock

The houses are haunted
By white night-gowns.
None are green,
Or purple with green rings,
Or green with yellow rings,
Or yellow with blue rings.
None of them are strange,
With socks of lace
And beaded ceintures.
People are not going
To dream of baboons and periwinkles.
Only, here and there, an old sailor,
Drunk and asleep in his boots,
Catches tigers
In red weather.

== Interpretation ==
The poem allows the reader to linger over the possibility of colors, strangeness and unusual dreams. Imagination that is absent from a mundane orderly life is represented by a dandified aesthete and an adventurous and exciting life by a drunken sailor dreaming of catching tigers in red weather.

The poem's message is fairly simple. Stevens believed that poetry and literature in general had the ability to excite and inspire. He believed that the imagination was an overlooked tool with the innate capability of distinguishing a mundane life (i.e. the lives of those who wore 'white night gowns' to bed) from an exciting and fulfilling one. Essentially, he believed that the only limit on a person's life was a weak imagination.

The poem itself shows that imagination has its own order, so the representation should be kept distinct from its subject. This follows one of the main facets necessary for modernist literature to function: that the object or idea being represented exists in and for itself. On this reading, the poem is not an indictment of middle-class values, though that is one interpretive option, but rather the "haunted house" of white night-gowns represents life without imagination.
