= Infanta Marina =

Poem by Wallace Stevens

- by Wallace Stevens
- Written: between 1914 and 1923
- First published in: Harmonium
- Country: United States
- Language: English
- Lines: 15

"Infanta Marina" is one of the group of collected poems in Wallace Stevens' Harmonium, in this poem dealing with a seaside princess.

== Interpretation ==
Helen Vendler (in Words Chosen Out of Desire) presents the poem as a "double scherzo" on her in the possessive sense and on of in its partitive and possessive sense.

Infanta Marina

Her terrace was the sand
And the palms and the twilight.

She made of the motions of her wrist
The grandiose gestures
Of her thought.

The rumpling of the plumes
Of this creature of the evening
Came to be sleights of sails
Over the sea.

And thus she roamed
In the roamings of her fan,
Partaking of the sea,
And of the evening,
As they flowed around
And uttered their subsiding sound.

The long sequence of possessive phrases Vendler refers to may be enumerated as: 'of the motions', 'of her wrist', 'of her thought', 'of the plumes', 'of this creature', 'of this evening', 'of sails', 'of her fan', 'of the sea', and 'of the evening'. This litany in sequence using the possessive form involving repeated ofs shows syntactically what the poem states semantically, Vendler proposes: the interpenetration of mind and nature, the denial of "significant difference" among the objects of the various of-clauses. This semantics may be read as a naturalistic denial of metaphysical dualism between mind and matter, a natural twin to the reading of "Invective Against Swans" as mocking the dualistic soul and its dubious journey to a realm that transcends nature.

The princess of the sea in this poem may be compared to "donna" who is "sequestered over the sea" in "O Florida, Venereal Soil", and to "Fabliau of Florida", which in parallel fashion explores dissolution of boundaries in nature.
