= Six Significant Landscapes =

Poem by Wallace Stevens

"Six Significant Landscapes" is a poem from Wallace Stevens's first book of poetry, Harmonium. It was first published in 1916, so it is in the public domain.

Six Significant Landscapes

I
An old man sits
In the shadow of a pine tree
In China.
He sees larkspur,
Blue and white,
At the edge of the shadow,
Move in the wind.
His beard moves in the wind.
The pine tree moves in the wind.
Thus water flows
Over weeds.

II
The night is of the colour
Of a woman's arm:
Night, the female,
Obscure,
Fragrant and supple,
Conceals herself.
A pool shines,
Like a bracelet
Shaken in a dance.

III
I measure myself
Against a tall tree.
I find that I am much taller,
For I reach right up to the sun,
With my eye;
And I reach to the shore of the sea
With my ear.
Nevertheless, I dislike
The way ants crawl
In and out of my shadow.

IV
When my dream was near the moon,
The white folds of its gown
Filled with yellow light.
The soles of its feet
Grew red.
Its hair filled
With certain blue crystallizations
From stars,
Not far off.

V
Not all the knives of the lamp-posts,
Nor the chisels of the long streets,
Nor the mallets of the domes
And high towers,
Can carve
What one star can carve,
Shining through the grape-leaves.

VI
Rationalists, wearing square hats,
Think, in square rooms,
Looking at the floor,
Looking at the ceiling.
They confine themselves
To right-angled triangles.
If they tried rhomboids,
Cones, waving lines, ellipses --
As, for example, the ellipse of the half-moon --
Rationalists would wear sombreros.

Each of these six landscapes of the imagination is a poem in its own right, each conveying an image, simply sculpted and precise, contributing to a pastiche effect. The first displays the influence of haiku and orientalism on Stevens, the second evokes the romantic mystery of night, the third is a wry comment about the duality of the human condition, the dream in the fourth bears comparison to Klee and Chagall, the fifth acknowledges the subtlety of nature, and the sixth associates this subtlety with a reality that evades a rationalist point of view. The sixth can also be understood as Stevens's gentle contribution to the ancient quarrel between philosophical reason and poetic imagination, recommending that philosophers trade in their square hats for sombreros. Buttel appreciates in the fourth landscape a hallucinatory effect such that "space shrinks, the imagination expands, and the illogical perspective surprises the reader into a recognition of heavenly grandeur". Apropos of the first landscape, he cites Earl Miner in support of the idea that "the objectivity, indirectness, and condensation of the haiku technique seem to have had a more beneficial and lasting effect on his style than the merely ornamental details of orientalism". Buttel reads the fifth landscape as a reaction against "Romantic softness" in favor of "hard clarity", in the spirit of Imagism. The poem's central symbol is not something beyond the poem or something merely intimated by it, but is rather in the star, in the manner that Ezra Pound and the Symbolists recommended.
