= The Paltry Nude Starts on a Spring Voyage =

Poem by Wallace Stevens

"The Paltry Nude Starts on a Spring Voyage" is a poem from Wallace Stevens's first book, Harmonium. Originally published in 1919, it is in the public domain. Despite general agreement that it is indebted to Botticelli's The Birth of Venus, there is uncertainty about the nature of the debt.

The Paltry Nude Starts on a Spring Voyage

But not on a shell, she starts,
Archaic, for the sea.
But on the first-found weed
She scuds the glitters,
Noiselessly, like one more wave.

She too is discontent
And would have purple stuff upon her arms,
Tired of the salty harbors,
Eager for the brine and bellowing
Of the high interiors of the sea.

The wind speeds her on,
Blowing upon her hands
And watery back.
She touches the clouds, where she goes
In the circle of her traverse of the sea.

Yet this is meagre play
In the scrurry and water-shine
As her heels foam ---
Not as when the goldener nude
Of a later day

Will go, like the centre of sea-green pomp,
In an intenser calm,
Scullion of fate,
Across the spick torrent, ceaselessly,
Upon her irretrievable way.

Helen Vendler takes it as obvious that the poem is about "our impoverished American Venus, who has none of the trappings of Botticelli's Venus, but who will eventually accumulate aura and mythological fullness through new American art". She dismisses the English poet Craig Raine's identification of the paltry nude with a sailboat. ("The nude is, one guesses, a sailing boat....Later, the ship will be weather-beaten, a goldener nude, and will eventually sink.") That only confirms that "the English incomprehension of Stevens continues almost unabated", she acidly remarks, conceding that Frank Kermode is the exception that proves the rule. She might concede that the "archaic" one of the first two lines is foam-arisen Aphrodite, who the paltry nude is not, but might well disapprove of the suggestion that the one who "scuds the glitters" is the American Venus (reduced to scudding on a weed) and that "the goldener nude" is Botticelli's Venus.

Ronald Sukenick declares with equal certainty that "the nude is an emblematic figure of spring. There is a comparison between spring, in the first part of the poem, and a similar figure representing summer, in the latter part. Thus spring is 'paltry,' particularly early spring, spring at the start of her voyage, as compared with the fullness of summer described later on." 'Scrurry', though often reproduced, is a misprint for "scurry", as his posthumous papers show.

Compare Stevens's poem "Bantam in Pine-Woods" which also makes a statement about the new American art.
