= Invective Against Swans =

Poem by Wallace Stevens

"Invective Against Swans" is a poem by Wallace Stevens from his first book of poetry, Harmonium (1923).

Invective against Swans

The soul, O ganders, flies beyond the parks
And far beyond the discords of the wind.

A bronze rain from the sun descending marks
The death of summer, which that time endures

Like one who scrawls a listless testament
Of golden quirks and Paphian caricatures,

Bequeathing your white feathers to the moon
And giving your bland motions to the air.

Behold, already on the long parades
The crows anoint the statues with their dirt.

And the soul, O ganders, being lonely, flies
Beyond your chilly chariots, to the skies.

== Analysis ==
=== Stevens's ironic mode ===
It has been observed that Stevens has two modes. The first mode is a pure and orgiastic—Dionysian—celebration of life while the second is that of the malign and ironic observer. "Invective against Swans" can be classified as belonging to the latter. David Herd plausibly locates the insult at an abstract level.

One of the tasks Modernist poets set themselves, probably the chief task, was to resuscitate the all but clapped-out diction of English-language poetry. It was for this reason Wallace Stevens wrote his "Invective Against Swans"....Stevens wanted people to understand that the language of poetry (as it was passed down to him by his Victorian predecessors), with its over-dependence on swans and clouds, was all but obsolete, capable only of expressing a certain poetical mood—a mood of burdened over-sensitivity.

Arguably then, the poem is insulting not swans and clouds but rather both worn-out Victorian diction and the philosophical/poetic impulse to escape nature, the latter through that decrepit vehicle of the soul which figures in Platonic and Christian conceptions of immortality and a transcendent world. There is no reason to think that Stevens was comfortable in any such vehicle. In 1902 the 22-year-old Stevens enters in his journal, "An old argument with me is that the true religious force in the world is not the church but the world itself." In Adagia he writes, "After one has abandoned a belief in god, poetry is that essence which takes its place as life's redemption." See also "A High-Toned Old Christian Woman".

=== Re-imagining the natural world ===
The poem may be saying that the poet should re-imagine the natural world, neither escaping to Plato's world of Forms or the Christian heaven, nor relying on Victorian imagination. "Invective against Swans" perhaps "shows" how to do that re-imagining. Its allusion to Paphos, the mythical birthplace of Aphrodite—embodiment of the values of love, sex, and beauty—doesn't bespeak an attitude that exults in slipping "the surly bonds of Earth." Instead it expresses summer's end in a pungently non-Victorian way.

== Publication history ==
"Invective Against Swans" was first published in Harmonium, prior to 1923 and is therefore in the public domain.
