= Sunday Morning (poem) =

Poem by Wallace Stevens

"Sunday Morning" is a poem from Wallace Stevens' first book of poetry, Harmonium. Published in part in the November 1915 issue of Poetry, then in full in 1923 in Harmonium, it is now in the public domain. The first published version can be read at the Poetry web site: The literary critic Yvor Winters considered "Sunday Morning" "the greatest American poem of the twentieth century and... certainly one of the greatest contemplative poems in English" (Johnson, 100).

== Summary ==
Sunday Morning

Complacencies of the peignoir, and late
Coffee and oranges in a sunny chair,
And the green freedom of a cockatoo
Upon a rug mingle to dissipate
The holy hush of ancient sacrifice.
She dreams a little, and she feels the dark
Encroachment of that old catastrophe,

.
.
.
.

And in the isolation of the sky,
At evening, casual flocks of pigeons make
Ambiguous undulations as they sink,
Downward to darkness, on extended wings.

About this poem Stevens wrote that it was "simply an expression of paganism". Helen Vendler in the Cambridge Companion to Wallace Stevens summarized the poem as Stevens's search for "a systematic truth that could replace the Christianity of his churchgoing childhood." For Vendler, the stratagem which Stevens employs in attempting to accomplish this purpose is "of writing of himself in the third person, not as 'he' but as 'she', adopting a female persona for reflections that might at the time have seemed too 'unmanly' to be voiced with a masculine pronoun: 'Divinity must live within herself', declares the woman who has decided to celebrate Sunday at home with 'Coffee and oranges' instead of going to church." The critic Robert Buttel sees the poem as establishing the French painter Matisse as "a kindred spirit" to Stevens, in that both artists "transform a pagan joy of life into highly civilized terms."
