= Gubbinal =

Poem by Wallace Stevens

"Gubbinal" is a poem from Wallace Stevens's first book of poetry, Harmonium (1923). It is in the public domain according to Librivox.

== Interpretation ==
It can be read as one of his "poems of epistemology", as B. J. Leggett styles it in his Nietzschean reading of Stevens' perspectivism, a minimalistic statement of his interest in the relationship between imagination and the world. The term 'gubbinal' may derive from 'gubbin', slang for a dullard, referring here to someone who takes the world to be ugly and the people sad.

Gubbinal

That strange flower, the sun,
Is just what you say.
Have it your way.

The world is ugly,
And the people are sad.

That tuft of jungle feathers,
That animal eye,
Is just what you say.

That savage of fire,
That seed,
Have it your way.

The world is ugly,
And the people are sad.
