= A High-Toned Old Christian Woman =

Poem by Wallace Stevens

"A High-Toned Old Christian Woman" is a poem in Wallace Stevens's first book of poetry, Harmonium (1923).

A High-Toned Old Christian Woman

Poetry is the supreme fiction, madame.
Take the moral law and make a nave of it
And from the nave build haunted heaven. Thus,
The conscience is converted into palms,
Like windy citherns hankering for hymns.
We agree in principle. That's clear. But take
The opposing law and make a peristyle,
And from the peristyle project a masque
Beyond the planets. Thus, our bawdiness,
Unpurged by epitaph, indulged at last,
Is equally converted into palms,
Squiggling like saxophones. And palm for palm,
Madame, we are where we began. Allow,
Therefore, that in the planetary scene
Your disaffected flagellants, well-stuffed,
Smacking their muzzy bellies in parade,
Proud of such novelties of the sublime,
Such tink and tank and tunk-a-tunk-tunk,
May, merely may, madame, whip from themselves
A jovial hullabaloo among the spheres.
This will make widows wince. But fictive things
Wink as they will. Wink most when widows wince.

Milton J. Bates interprets the poem as a "shocking version" of Santayana's argument in Interpretations of Poetry and Religion (1900) that poetry and religion are equally fictions of the human mind, simply reflecting the values of the human maker.

== Interpretation ==
In his mock-judicious, mock-pompous setting of genteel debate ("...May, merely may, madame,..."), Stevens has fun with the idea of an objective moral order possessed of religious authority, the word "nave" suggesting "knave" as in "knaves will continue to proselyte fools"; the resulting heaven is "haunted". Just as a classical peristyle might be set in opposition to a Gothic nave, a pagan moral perspective might, "palm for palm", replace Palm-Sunday palms/psalms by squiggling-saxophone palms. The alternative to the haunted heaven is still simply a "projection", though of an allegorical masque rather than an architecture. The bawdy adherents of such an "opposing law" would not exhibit Christianity's ascetic virtues but instead—"equally"—with a "tink and tank and tunk-a-tunk-tunk", might just produce a jovial hullabaloo comparing favorably with history's construction of "haunted heaven".

Another interpretive direction is that the poem is about nihilism rather than an alternative morality of pagan virtues. Bates seems to take this direction when he writes, "If lewdness is human, why not project a heaven on this basis rather than the moral sentiment?" This seems to concede that the alternative construction wouldn't be a moral perspective, capable of sustaining its own moral sentiment, but rather a nihilistic "lewd" rejection of "the moral sentiment"—enough to make a high-toned Christian widow wince.
