= The Comedian as the Letter C =

Poem by Wallace Stevens

"The Comedian as the Letter C" is a poem from Wallace Stevens's first book of poetry, Harmonium (1923). It was one of the few poems first published in that collection and the last written for it. John Gould Fletcher frames the poem as expressing Stevens's view "that the artist can do nothing else but select out of life the elements to form a 'fictive' or fictitious reality."

== Interpretation ==
John Gould Fletcher frames the poem as expressing Stevens's view

"that the artist can do nothing else but select out of life the elements to form a 'fictive' or fictitious reality. But this is not necessarily a higher reality; he is unable to take any moral category for granted. It is merely the artist's reality. And as such it becomes disintegrated against the banal, the ordinary, the commonplace, which is every-day reality. The result of this disintegration of the artist's personality is to be found in the poem which is entitled 'The Comedian as the Letter C....'"

The poem recounts Crispin's voyage from Bordeaux to Yucatán to North Carolina, a voyage of hoped-for growth and self-discovery, representing according to one of Stevens's letters "the sort of life that millions of people live", though Milton Bates reasonably interprets it as a fable of his own career up to 1921. Interpreters diverge on whether to emphasize its comedic qualities, with Bates, or its serious intent, with Vendler; to regard the journey as quixotic or partially successful.

If the poem placed first in Harmonium, "Earthy Anecdote", signals Stevens's attempt to transcend "locality", "Comedian" is a statement about what Stevens has learned from the attempt at the completion of the collection. Can Crispin (the artist, the poet, Stevens) hope to be something more than "the intelligence of his soil"? Can the "Socrates of snails" leave his homeland for the sea, and refocus his imagination and refashion himself

On porpoises, instead of apricots,
And on silentious porpoises, whose snouts
Dibbled in waves that were mustachios,
Inscrutable hair in an inscrutable world.

The intense word play of "Comedian" is the indirection Stevens needs to address the struggle to grow, which is indeed underway in the poem itself. (Another interpretation would dismiss the word play as Stevens's aestheticism and dandyism/hedonism.) The sea journey causes his old poetic self to be "dissolved", "annulled", leaving only a problematic "starker, barer self", an "introspective voyager". His imagination must cope with "strict austerity", yet in that struggle in the sea there is "something given to make whole" what was shattered by "the large". The sea's "magnitude" affords some recompense for leaving behind the comforts of land ("locality").

In his travels he learns from the "green barbarism" of Yucatán, aware of a self possessing him that was not in him in the "crusty town" from which he sailed, developing an aesthetic "tough, diverse, untamed". He

Found his vicissitudes had much enlarged
His apprehension, made him intricate
In moody rucks, and difficult and strange
In all desires, his destitution's mark.

He travels next to North Carolina, which "helps him round his rude aesthetic out" by savoring rankness (burly smells of dampened lumber, etc.) like a sensualist.

It purified him. It made him see how much
Of what he saw he never saw at all.

Crispin next plans a colony of poets, which would allow a new intelligence to prevail. There would be representatives from various locales, from California to Brazil, from Mississippi to Florida.

What was the purpose of his pilgrimage,
Whatever shape it took in Crispin's mind,
If not, when all is said, to drive away
The shadow of his fellows from the skies,
And, from their stale intelligence released,
To make a new intelligence prevail?

Harold Bloom suggests that "the shadow of his fellows" that Stevens was trying to drive away was specifically Walt Whitman's influence, and that he did not succeed in transcending that influence.

Stevens eventually dismisses the idea of a colony as a kind of counterfeit of his original aspiration to overcome "locality". Frustrated, he settles for a cabin, takes a wife, and has children. Crispin embraces the quotidian. Is this a tragedy,

Because he built a cabin who once planned
Loquacious columns by the ructive sea?

The poem leaves this question unanswered.
