= Le Monocle de Mon Oncle =

Poem by Wallace Stevens

"Le Monocle de Mon Oncle" is a poem from Wallace Stevens's first book of poetry, Harmonium. It was first published in 1918.

Le Monocle de Mon Oncle (Canto VIII)

Like a dull scholar, I behold, in love,
An ancient aspect touching a new mind.
It comes, it
blooms, it bears its fruit and dies.
This trivial trope
reveals a way of truth.
Our bloom is gone. We are the fruits
thereof.
Two golden gourds distended on our vines,
Into the autumn weather, splashed with frost,
Distorted by hale fatness, turned grotesque.
We hang like warty squashes, streaked and rayed,
The laughing sky will see the two of us
Washed into rinds by rotting winter rains.

Quoted at the right is the eighth canto. (The whole poem can be found elsewhere.) Canto I includes the line "I wish that I might be a thinking stone."

Harold Bloom regaled his students with an off-beat interpretation of Canto II's line, "Shall I uncrumple this much-crumpled thing?", as alluding to an inactive sexual relationship to Elsie ("you", the Other).

Canto IV includes the verse,

This luscious and impeccable fruit of life
Falls, it appears, of its own weight to earth.
When you were Eve, its acrid juice was sweet,
Untasted, in its heavenly, orchard
air.

Canto XI includes the verse,

If sex were all, then every trembling hand
Could make us squeak, like dolls, the wished-for words.

And in canto XII the poem concludes with the verse,

Like a rose rabbi, later, I pursued,
And still pursue, the origin and course
Of love, but until now I never knew
That fluttering things have so distinct a shade.

Holly Stevens quotes a letter of her father in which he writes, "I had in mind simply a man fairly well along in life, looking back and talking in a more or less personal way about life." This is widely regarded as reticence about the poem's commentary on his domestic life, or, as Helen Vendler phrases it, the poem is "about Stevens' failed marriage", "about [his] middle age and romantic disillusion". She defends herself against the accusation of biographical reduction, which elsewhere she directs against Joan Richardson's psychobiography of

Stevens, as follows.

It has been objected that a criticism

suggesting that poems spring from life is reductive, that is to say that "Le Monocle de Mon Oncle" is about Stevens' failed marriage is somehow injurious to the poem. It seems to me normal to begin with the life-occasion as we deduce it from the poem; it is only an error when one ends there. To tether Stevens' poems to human feeling is at least to remove him from the "world of ghosts" where he is so often located, and to insist that he is a poet of more than epistemological questions

alone.

Vendler and Richardson disagree about how to understand Stevens' distinction between the "true subject" of a poem and "the poetry of the subject". For Richardson it corresponds to the difference between the infantile kernel of a Stevens poem and the surface of his words' appearance. For Vendler the true subject is an experience and the poetry of the subject is a rendering of it. Richardson is led from her conception of the subject—"the fears and uncertainties of the boy who still crouched inside him"—to diagnose the surface of the poem as reflecting "the American dissociation of sensibility that began with the first Puritans giving the rhetorical lie to the truth of their experience." Vendler thinks this is even worse than simply "ending there" in biography, for it leads away from the poetry of the subject, which in her view requires understanding the special role of syntax that allows Stevens to achieve his poetic effects. ("Stevens's words are almost always deflected from their common denotation, and his syntax serves to delay and to disarticulate....What an image was to Pound, a syllable was to Stevens.")

See also "Two Figures in Dense Violet Night".
