= The Snow Man =

Poem from Wallace Stevens

The Snow Man

One must have a mind of winter
To regard the frost and the boughs
Of the pine-trees crusted with snow;

And have been cold a long time
To behold the junipers shagged with ice,
The spruces rough in the distant glitter

Of the January sun; and not to think
Of any misery in the sound of the wind,
In the sound of a few leaves,

Which is the sound of the land
Full of the same wind
That is blowing in the same bare place

For the listener, who listens in the snow,
And, nothing himself, beholds
Nothing that is not there and the nothing that is.

"The Snow Man" is a poem from Wallace Stevens's first book of poetry, Harmonium, first published in the October 1921 issue of the journal Poetry.

== Overview ==
Sometimes classified as one of Stevens' "poems of epistemology", it can be read as an expression of the naturalistic skepticism that he absorbed from his friend and mentor George Santayana. It is doubtful that anything can be known about a substantial self (Santayana was an epiphenomenalist) or indeed about substances in the world apart from the perspectives that human imagination brings to "the nothing that is" when it perceives "junipers shagged with ice", etc. There is something wintry about this insight, which Stevens captures in The Necessary Angel by writing, "The world about us would be desolate except for the world within us."

The poem is an expression of Stevens' perspectivism, leading from a relatively objective description of a winter scene to a relatively subjective emotional response (thinking of misery in the sound of the wind), to the final idea that the listener and the world itself are "nothing" apart from these perspectives. Stevens has the world look at winter from a different point of view. When thinking of winter, one might think of a harsh storm. One might also think snow and ice to be a nuisance. Stevens wants people to see the opposite view. He wants the world to look at winter in a sense of optimism and beauty. He creates a difference between imagination and reality. See "Gubbinal" and "Nuances of a Theme by Williams" for comparisons.

B.J. Leggett construes Stevens's perspectivism as commitment to the principle that "instead of facts we have perspectives, none privileged over the others as truer or more nearly in accord with things as they are, although not for that reason all equal." This principle that "underlies Nietzschean thought" is central to Leggett's reading. It may be observed that Stevens's remark in the passage quoted above from The Necessary Angel falls short of conforming to that principle, implying a condition of `the world about us' that is distinct from the perspectives we bring to it.

== Notes ==
The Collected Poems of Wallace Stevens, New York: Vintage Books, 1954.
