= Paul Windels =

American lawyer

- Born: December 7, 1885; Brooklyn, New York City, U.S.
- Died: December 15, 1967 (aged 82); Norwalk, Connecticut, U.S.
- Education: Columbia College (BA); Brooklyn Law School (LLB)
- Occupation: Lawyer
- Title: Corporation Counsel of New York City (1934–1937)

Paul Windels Sr. (December 7, 1885 – December 15, 1967) was an American lawyer and government official. He served as Corporation Counsel of New York City under Fiorello La Guardia from 1934 to 1937.

== Biography ==
Windels was born in Brooklyn, New York City, on December 7, 1885, the son of Pauline Klink and John Henry Windels. He graduated from Columbia College in 1908 where he was a member of the Philolexian Society, and Brooklyn Law School in 1909.

Windels was a Republican leader in the New York City Assembly District 4 and became a counsel to the New York State Bridge and Tunnel Commission. He then became associate counsel of the Port Authority of New York and New Jersey in 1930 when the commission was merged with the Port Authority.

Windels was named Corporation Counsel of New York City in 1934 and served under La Guardia's first term, during which he reorganized the activities of the law department and instituted new rules that ended excessive claims against the city, saving the city over $50 million. He returned to private practice in 1937, while serving as chairman of the New York City Traffic Commission and the Mayor's Committee on Housing Legislation. He was a partner in the firm of Windels, Merritt, and Ingraham, and specialized in corporate and municipal litigation.

Windels was a delegate to the Republican National Convention from 1920 to 1928 and in 1940, when he was one of the first New York state delegates to support Wendell Willkie's nomination for the United States presidency. He was chief counsel of the Rapp-Coudert Committee, which investigated the extent of communist influence in the public education system of the state of New York and was responsible for the dismissal of over 50 teachers and clerks at city colleges and public schools for alleged communist sympathies.

Windels was active in civic life of New York City. He served as the chairman of the Committee of Fifteen from 1930 to 1940 and chairman of the Citizen's Transit Committee, which advocated the creation of the Metropolitan Transportation Authority, from 1943 to 1949. From 1943 to 1952, he was also President of the Regional Plan Association of New York. He was also president of the Brooklyn Heights Association.

Windels was a trustee of the Brooklyn Daily Eagle, Bowery Savings Bank, and the Brooklyn Public Library, as well as a former vice president of the Brooklyn Law School. He was also active in French cultural affairs by co-founding and chairing the boards of the Lycée Français de New York and serving as chairman of the French Institute Alliance Française and president of the Museum of French Art.

Windels died on December 16, 1967, at age 82, in Norwalk, Connecticut.
