= A. S. W. Rosenbach =

American collector (1876–1952)

Abraham Simon Wolf Rosenbach
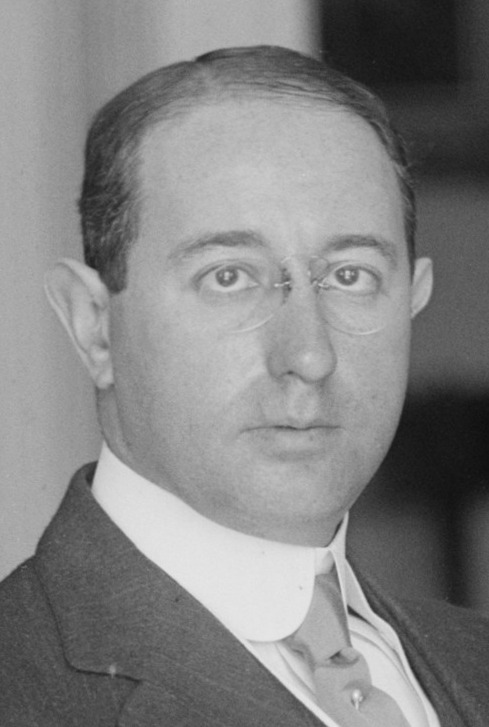
- Born: July 22, 1876; Philadelphia, Pennsylvania, US
- Died: July 1, 1952 (aged 75); Philadelphia, Pennsylvania, US
- Resting place: Mount Sinai Cemetery
- Education: University of Pennsylvania (BS and PhD)
- Occupation: Antiquarian bookseller
- Family: Moses Polock (uncle)

Abraham Simon Wolf Rosenbach (July 22, 1876 – July 1, 1952) was an American collector, scholar, and dealer in rare books and manuscripts. In London, where he frequently attended the auctions at Sotheby's, he was known as "The Terror of the Auction Room." In Paris, he was called "Le Napoléon des Livres" ("The Napoleon of Books"). Many others referred to him as "Dr. R.", a "Robber Baron" and "the Greatest Bookdealer in the World".

Rosenbach is credited with popularizing the collecting of American literature at a time when only European literature was considered collectible. He also advanced the idea of book collecting as a means of investment and published several articles and books to increase interest in rare books and manuscripts.

He bought and sold numerous items throughout his life, including eight Gutenberg Bibles, more than 30 Shakespeare's First Folios, a copy of the Bay Psalm Book and the manuscripts of Ulysses and Alice's Adventures in Wonderland. The lifetime total of his purchases is estimated to be worth more than $75,000,000 in 2019.

His philanthropic contributions include donating his collection of children's books to the Free Library of Philadelphia, establishing the A.S.W. Rosenbach Lectures in Bibliography at the University of Pennsylvania and willing his estate to the Rosenbach Foundation, which established the Rosenbach Museum & Library.

Rosenbach was also closely involved in the founding of the American Jewish Historical Society (established 1892), and his early donation of printed books and ephemera relating to American Judaica provided the core of the original rare book collection. The A.S.W. Rosenbach Collection of American Judaica includes over 350 books and pamphlets published in America before 1850 that relate to Jews or their experiences in the Americas.

== Early life and education ==
Abraham Simon Wolf Rosenbach was born on July 22, 1876, in Philadelphia, Pennsylvania. He was referred to by many in the public as "Abe", with some close-friends calling him "Rosy" and "Abie" by his family. He was the youngest of the eight children of Morris Rosenbach (May 14, 1820 – May 8, 1885) and Isabella H. Polock (November 26, 1834 – July 25, 1906). His mother was born and raised in Philadelphia, where she was an active member of the Jewish community, involved with the Female Hebrew Benevolent Society, the Jewish Orphans' Society and Congregation Mikveh Israel. His father immigrated to the United States from Gunzenhausen in 1844. Shortly after he changed his first name from Meier to Morris and entered the shirt business, selling overalls and underwear. He became a U.S. Citizen in 1855. Morris and Isabella were married by Rabbi Isaac Leeser on November 11, 1857.

At the age of 9, Rosenbach began helping out in the shop of his maternal uncle, Moses Polock (May 14, 1817 – August 16, 1903), who was a well-known and somewhat eccentric antiquarian bookseller. Polock's famous shop was located at 406 Commerce Street in Philadelphia. It was there he learned how to determine book values, how to use bibliography and how to talk to collectors.

At the age of 11, Rosenbach started collecting books when he purchased an illustrated edition of Reynard the Fox at the auction house of Stanislaus Vincent Henkel. He lowered the price to $24 and allowed the young man to make weekly payments out of his school allowance for the book due to Henkel's working relationship with his Uncle Moses.

In June 1889, Rosenbach finished school at George Meade School and in the fall was enrolled at Central Manual Training School. His senior year, he served as editor-in-chief of the school's student newspaper, The Argus.

It was as a freshman at the University of Pennsylvania Rosenbach would make his first valuable purchase. He bought a first edition of Dr. Samuel Johnson's Prologue, which David Garrick recited at his first opening night as manager of the Theatre Royal, Drury Lane in 1747. It was the first book printed by Horace Walpole at the Strawberry Hill Press. Rosenbach bought it for $3.60 at Henkel's auction house and later received an offer of $5,000 for the book, which he refused.

At Penn, Rosenbach took part in the Bibliophiles Club. In 1898, he earned his bachelor's in science from the University of Pennsylvania. He then was appointed to the university's Harrison Fellowship in English. He earned his PhD from the school in 1901, his thesis was titled "The influence of Spanish literature in the Elizabethan and Stuart drama".

== Career ==
Philip Hyman Rosenbach (September 29, 1863 – March 5, 1953) was Rosenbach's second oldest brother. Before joining forces with his younger sibling, he ran a series of successful businesses. He briefly ran a stationery store at Third Street, just south of Market Street, with money borrowed from the family, before borrowing more money again to start the Savory Restaurant at 13th and Chestnut Streets. This venture would also be short lived. Next was a gift shop at 1320 Walnut Street, selling items like Christmas cards, prints, vases and statuettes. A.S.W. Rosenbach would work in the shop in his free time while in college. This business venture also struggled. But in 1903, with Polock's declining health, Philip convinced his uncle, his mother and his brother to use Polock's inventory to start up an antiques and book business. In this new venture, Rosenbach was responsible for dealing with books and his brother Philip antique furniture and art. The Rosenbach Company formed on June 22, 1903, and Polock died on August 16 that same year. The business was largely funded at first by Philadelphia collectors Clarence S. Bement and Joseph M. Fox. The first sale the brothers made was on October 25, 1903, selling two picture frames for $50 each. In 1927, Rosenbach wrote of his decision to leave the world of academia for a life of book selling, writing:

"I felt a renegade. I had deserted the halls of learning for the bookshop; I had given up my fellowship to enter a business that would, perhaps, put money in my purse. I did not, when at college, appreciate what a high adventure the business was to prove, the excitement and anxiety of the chase, and that I had a better chance, a far greater opportunity, to unearth unpublished documents, and uncover original source-material, than ever I could have as an instructor in English in some university."

— A.S.W. Rosenbach, Books and Bidders: The Adventures of a Bibliophile (1927) page 260.

As Polock had no will, most of his store inventory went up for auction on March 9 and 10, 1904 by Stanislaus Vincent Henkels at the book auction rooms of Davis & Harvey at 112 Walnut Street. The brothers were able to buy most of the inventory. What remained of Polock's estate after the sale was sold to The Rosenbach company by Polock's sisters, Isabella Rosenbach, Sophia Binswanger and Miriam Wolf, for $1,000.

The auction included Polock's collection of children's literature, which consisted of 816 American children's books dating from 1682 to 1836. Rosenbach expanded on this collection throughout the years and donated it to the Free Library of Philadelphia in 1947, where it formed the beginning of the library's collection of early American children's books.

The Rosenbach Company originally operated out of the entire building at the former location of Philip Rosenbach's gift shop. In 1935, it expanded to encompass 1322 Walnut Street as well. As of 2019, the address is home to an IHOP.

Rosenbach worked with Henry E. Huntington to help assemble the collections of the Huntington Library in San Marino, California. He did the same for Henry Clay Folger at the Folger Shakespeare Library in Washington, D.C. Other famous clients included J. P. Morgan, Lessing Rosenwald, and Harry Elkins Widener.

In 1924, Rosenbach acquired James Joyce's Ulysses manuscript for $1,975. Joyce asked to buy it back but Rosenbach refused. In a letter to Harriet Shaw Weaver on May 24, 1924, referring to a telegram that misspelled the title as "Ullyses", Joyce wrote of Rosenbach in a limerick, saying:

"Rosy Brook he bought a book,

Though he didn't know how to spell it. Such is the lure of literature,

To the lad who can buy and sell it."

— James Joyce

A lifelong Philadelphian, Rosenbach and his brother lived at a four-storied 1865 townhouse at 2010 Delancey Place, from 1926 to 1952. In 1928, Rosenbach purchased the manuscript of Lewis Carroll's Alice's Adventures in Wonderland for $77,000 at auction. The act angered many in Great Britain at the loss of the item. Rosenbach would go on to sell it for $97,000 and it was eventually returned to Britain.

Rosenbach was elected a member of the American Antiquarian Society in 1927 and the American Philosophical Society in 1928. For the Antiquarian Society, he wrote and read two papers. The first in 1934 was titled "The Libraries of the Presidents of the United States" and the second 1938 named "The First Theatrical Company in America". Right before his death, he was working on a third paper called "Some Discoveries in Early Pennsylvania-German Printing".

On December 8, 1938, Rosenbach hosted a rare book auction at the Hotel Plaza in New York City for charity, raising $35,000 for the Distribution Committee of the American Funds for Jewish War Sufferers and the Committee for Christian Refugees. Special-guest auctioneers included Christopher Morley, Major Bowes and Dorothy Thompson.

In 1942, the two brothers liquidated their antique furniture inventory to strictly deal in books. They moved their newly downsized collection to 1618 Locust Street, Philadelphia. This townhome was designed in 1850 by architect John Notman. The company would operate out of this building until the deaths of the two brothers.

In 1947, Rosenbach set a record when he bought a copy of the Bay Psalm Book for $151,000. During his lifetime, it is estimated he spent more than $75 million on his purchases.

One of more notorious artifacts Rosenbach acquired during his life was the alleged mummified remains of Napoleon's penis. Rosenbach purchased it in 1924 from Maggs Bros Ltd as part of a larger collection of Napoleonic relics including silverware, clothing, vestments, and other objects. The price paid for the whole lot was $2,000. Rosenbach used the penis as a conversation piece for parties, and in 1927 temporarily loaned it to the Museum of French Art in New York where it was displayed on a small velvet cushion. Rosenbach sold the penis to collector Donald Hyde in 1947.

== Writing ==
Rosenbach wrote several articles on his own experiences, thoughts and stories around his life as an antique book dealer. These essays, originally published in The Saturday Evening Post and The Atlantic, were published as two books: Books and Bidders: The Adventures of a Bibliophile (1927) and A Book Hunter's Holiday: Adventures with Books and Manuscripts (1936). He also contributed to The Jewish Encyclopedia after writing several articles for the American Jewish Historical Society.

The Unpublishable Memoirs (1917) was the first and only book of fiction Rosenbach ever produced. It consists of 11 mystery stories about the fictional character Robert Hooker, a bibliophile who is tired of being rejected by high society for his lack of money and takes his revenge by tricking the rich out of their rare books and art. A London edition was published in 1924 and a Czech version in 1925, however this version only contains the first of the 11 stories.

Rosenbach also produced several book checklist, including Early American Children's Books (1933), published by the noted The Anthoensen Press, as a standard reference.

== Honors and associations ==
Rosenbach was granted many honors during his life. In 1927, he received the honorary degree of associate engineering from the University of Pennsylvania. In 1945, the Jewish Theological Seminary of America awarded him a Doctor of Humane Letters. In 1947, he received a Legum Doctor from Dropsie College for Hebrew and Cognate Learning and another Doctor of Humane Letters from Amherst College.

In 1946, a book made by thirty of Rosenbach's friends, entitled To Dr. R, featured a series of literary and bibliographical essays written in honor of his 70th birthday.

He was a member of the Philobiblon Club.

At the time of his death in 1952, he was Harbor-master of the Board of Commerce and Navigation of the State of New Jersey.

== Death and legacy ==
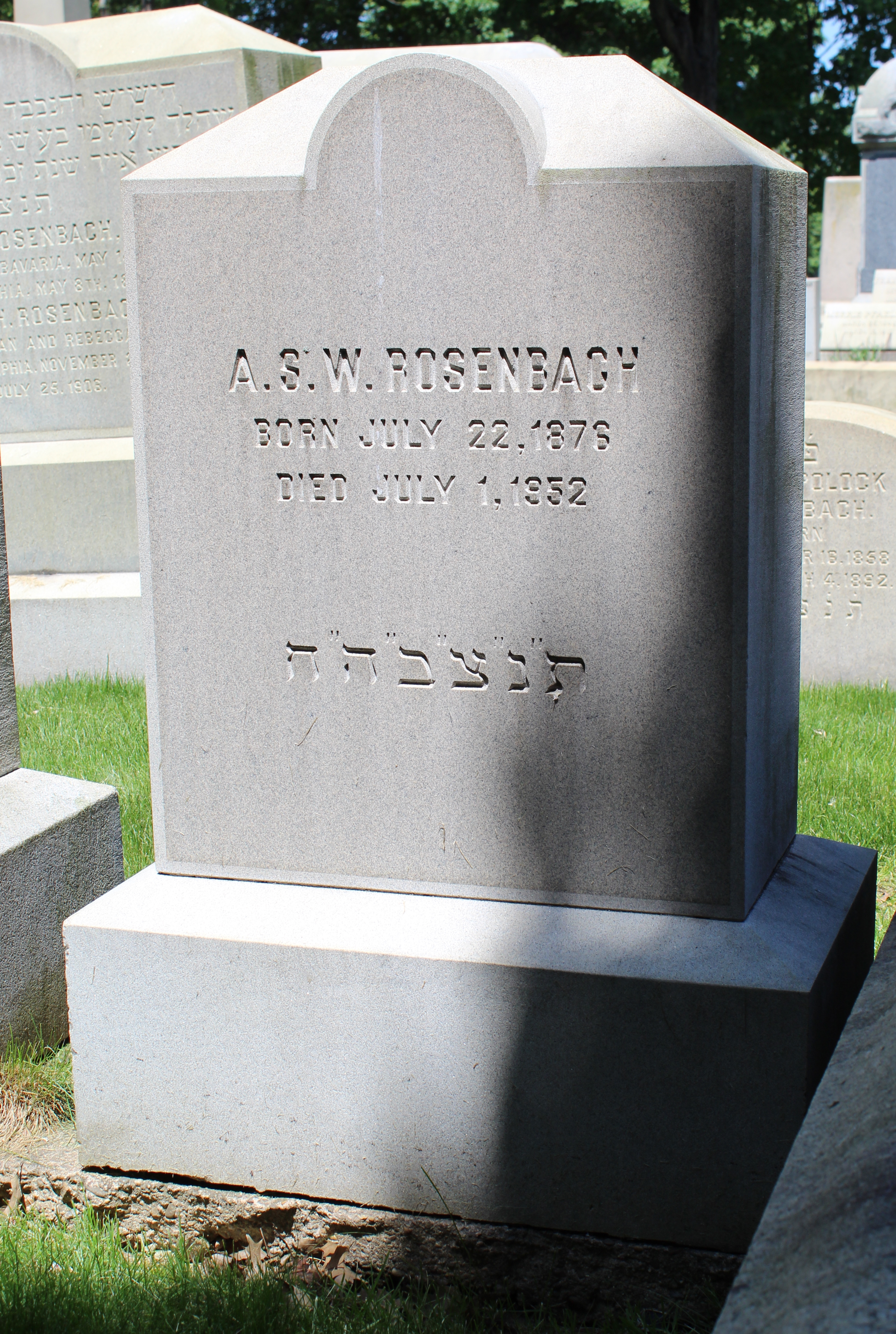
Headstone in Mount Sinai Cemetery

Rosenbach died on July 1, 1952, in Philadelphia at the age of 75. He was buried at Mount Sinai Cemetery.

Writer Christopher Morley wrote of Rosenbach in his essay Notes on Rosy, which first appeared in the Saturday Review on December 24, 1927.

"He is the Pied Piper of rare editions. He blows an airy wheedling note and the old vellums and calfskins come trotting after him."

— Christopher Morley, Saturday Review

=== Rosenbach Museum & Library ===
Shortly before his death, he bequeathed his estate to The Philip H. and A. S. W. Rosenbach Foundation, which had been established in 1950 by the two brothers to foster interest in books, paintings, and other works of art.

In 1954, the Rosenbach Museum & Library was established by testamentary gift of the Rosenbach's brother's collection. The museum, which includes his original libraries and residential areas, provides an intimate setting for visitors to explore the brothers' collections of rare books, manuscripts, furniture, silver, paintings, prints, drawings and sculpture. Items in the brother's collection include the only surviving copy of Benjamin Franklin's first Poor Richard's Almanack and the manuscript of James Joyce's manuscript of Ulysses. The collection has since grown to include the papers of poet Marianne Moore, Bram Stoker's notes for Dracula, and the drawings of Maurice Sendak.

The Rosenbach brothers' 1865 townhouse at 2010 Delancey Place is listed on the National Register of Historic Places. Since 2003, the adjacent Maurice Sendak Building was added to the museum and offers spaces for public programs and exhibitions. On December 3, 2013, the Rosenbach Museum & Library officially became affiliated with the Free Library of Philadelphia, becoming "The Rosenbach at the Free Library".

=== State Historical Marker ===
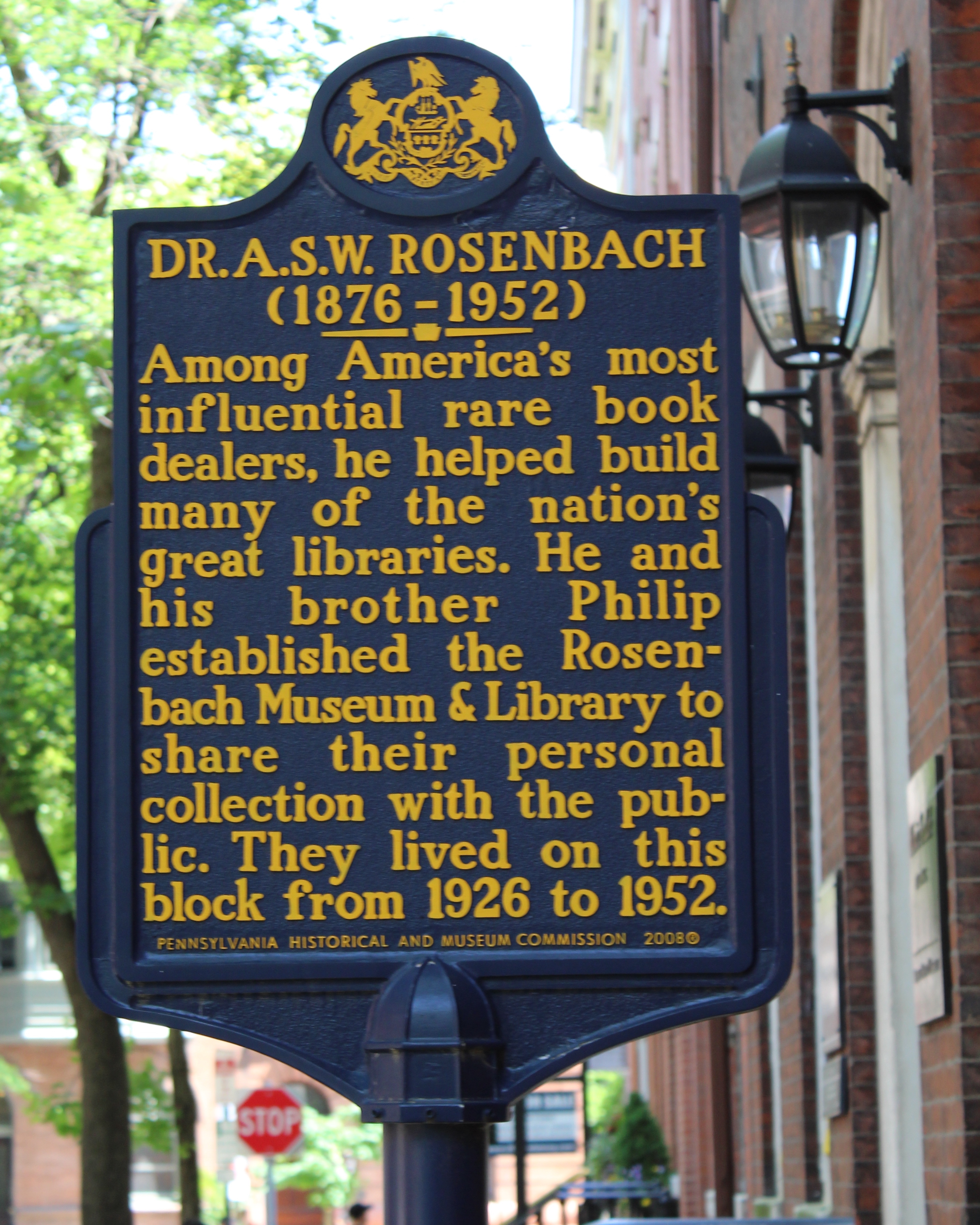
State Historical Marker

On April 2, 2008, the Rosenbach Museum & Library received an official State Historical Marker by the Pennsylvania Historical and Museum Commission in recognition of the lasting contributions of museum co-founder, Dr. A.S.W. Rosenbach. The commission commemorated Rosenbach's legacy as one of America's greatest rare book dealers and his lasting contributions to Philadelphia and beyond with a marker in front of the museum, located at 2008-2010 Delancey Place in the city's historic Rittenhouse Square neighborhood. The sign reads:

"Dr. A.S.W. Rosenbach (1876 – 1952) Among America's most influential rare book dealers, he helped build many of the nation's great libraries. He and his brother Philip established the Rosenbach Museum & Library to share their personal collection with the public. They lived on this block from 1926 to 1952."

=== A.S.W. Rosenbach Lectures in Bibliography ===
In 1928, Rosenbach bestowed to the Trustees of the University of Pennsylvania a gift for the purpose of establishing a lecture series on bibliography and book history. Selected participants present about three lectures over two weeks at the university. The first A.S.W. Rosenbach Lectures in Bibliography took place in 1931, with Christopher Morley as the first fellow.

As of 2023, the A.S.W. Rosenbach Lectures in Bibliography are the longest continuously running series of bibliographical lectureships in the U.S. The University of Pennsylvania Press has published several of these lectures into full-length books.

== Musical ==
In 2004, The Rosenbach Museum and Library commissioned writer Ben Katchor to create something to commemorate the museum's 50th anniversary. Bill Adair, the museum's director at the time, asked Katchor to create a graphic novel, but instead he partnered with Mark Mulcahy to create a musical. The Rosenbach Company: A Tragicomedy premiered the 2004 Philadelphia Fringe Festival and was performed at The Public Theater in New York City in 2006. The role of Abie Rosenbach was played by Mulcahy.

Toby Zinman praised the show in a 2004 review in Variety.

"Whatever this show is – a sung-through biodrama? a chamber rock opera? a meeting of the museum establishment with the music underground? – it is thrilling, charming and altogether a knockout."

— Toby Zinman, Variety
