= John K. Lattimer =

American urologist (1914–2007)

- Born: John Kingsley Lattimer; October 14, 1914; Mount Clemens, Michigan, U.S.
- Died: May 10, 2008 (aged 93); Teaneck, New Jersey, U.S.

John Kingsley Lattimer (October 14, 1914 – May 10, 2007) was a urologist who did extensive research on the Abraham Lincoln and John F. Kennedy assassinations, becoming the first medical specialist not affiliated with the United States government to examine the medical evidence related to Kennedy's assassination. Lattimer studied at Columbia University and became the urologist-in-chief of Presbyterian Hospital and chairman of the urology department at the College of Physicians and Surgeons of Columbia University for 25 years. He wrote 375 papers helping to establish pediatric urology as a field and is credited with developing a cure for renal tuberculosis.

== US Army doctor, World War II ==
During World War II, Dr. Lattimer served as an army physician and treated D-Day casualties in the field. Lattimer was attached to General George Smith Patton's Third Army and participated in Patton's drive across France. Lattimer frequently related a story where, on the occasion of Patton's first crossing of the Rhine River, he observed the General stop in the middle of a bridge and urinate over the side into the river.

Lattimer was assigned to the prisoners' barracks at Nuremberg in the spring of 1945, where notorious inmates like Hermann Göring were housed during their war crimes trial. Lattimer served as general medical officer during the Nuremberg Trials, attending to the medical needs of the war crimes defendants. Lattimer was on hand at Nuremberg prison to view Göring's body just after Göring had committed suicide in his prison cell by biting a cyanide capsule that he had kept concealed in a jar of medicinal cream.

Lattimer retired having attained the rank of colonel.

== Biography of Nazi leaders ==
In 1999, Lattimer wrote Hitler's Fatal Sickness and Other Secrets of the Nazi Leaders based largely on this experience. In this book he theorized that Hitler exhibited the symptoms of Parkinson's disease, which he demonstrates with examples of his deteriorating signature and photographs of Hitler clutching objects to prevent his hand from trembling. Lattimer further proposed that Hitler's discovery of his illness was a factor in postponing Germany's attack on Britain in late 1940 and directing his attention towards Russia.

== Innovator in Urology at Columbia-Presbyterian ==
After the war, Lattimer spent most of the rest of his life teaching at the Columbia University College of Physicians and Surgeons, where he was a professor and became chairman of the urology department of Presbyterian Hospital from 1955 to 1980.

At the Hospital, which in 1998 became NewYork–Presbyterian, the head of the Department is known as the John K. Lattimer Professor of Urology. His patients included Katharine Hepburn, Charles Lindbergh, Dmitri Shostakovich, Itzhak Perlman and Greta Garbo.

== Investigator into Kennedy assassination ==
The Kennedy family chose him in 1972 as the first non-governmental expert to examine evidence taken at Kennedy's autopsy. Lattimer performed ballistic tests and other research to prove that Lee Harvey Oswald was likely the sniper who shot and killed President John F. Kennedy from the Texas School Book Depository in Dallas. Lattimer frequently performed a demonstration of Oswald's shooting, firing three well-aimed shots within 8.3 seconds with a 6.5×52mm Italian Carcano M91/38 bolt-action rifle, the same as Oswald's actual weapon and under the same firing conditions. By doing so, Lattimer intended to prove that Oswald could have performed such a feat. He continued to perform this demonstration well into his late eighties. Lattimer owned Oswald's Marine shooting record, which he said showed that Oswald was an excellent shot. In 1980, Dr. Lattimer wrote a book: Kennedy and Lincoln: Medical & Ballistic Comparisons of Their Assassinations in which he did an investigation of both the Lincoln and the Kennedy assassinations, and supported the findings of the Warren Commission. In his book, Lattimer theorized that President Kennedy's arms exhibited the "Thorburn Position" with elbows extended and arms folded inward, as a neurological reaction to the bullet wound to his spine.

== Collector of military artifacts ==
Lattimer lived in Englewood, New Jersey. His 30-room Englewood home contained an extensive collection of military paraphernalia, including "medieval armor, Revolutionary and Civil War rifles and swords, a pile of cannonballs, World War II machine guns, German Lugers, and drawings by Adolf Hitler. Lattimer stole personal items from several of the Nuremberg defendants, such as Hermann Göring's underwear and his Luftwaffe ring. Lattimer was the owner of several grisly historical artifacts including one of the two cyanide capsules that Göring smuggled into his Nuremberg prison (Göring used the other capsule to commit suicide minutes before he was to be executed), a blood-stained collar that President Lincoln wore to Ford's Theater the night he was shot, and a medically preserved section of penile tissue which Lattimer said belonged to Napoleon Bonaparte.
