= Napoleon's penis =

Body part of Napoleon

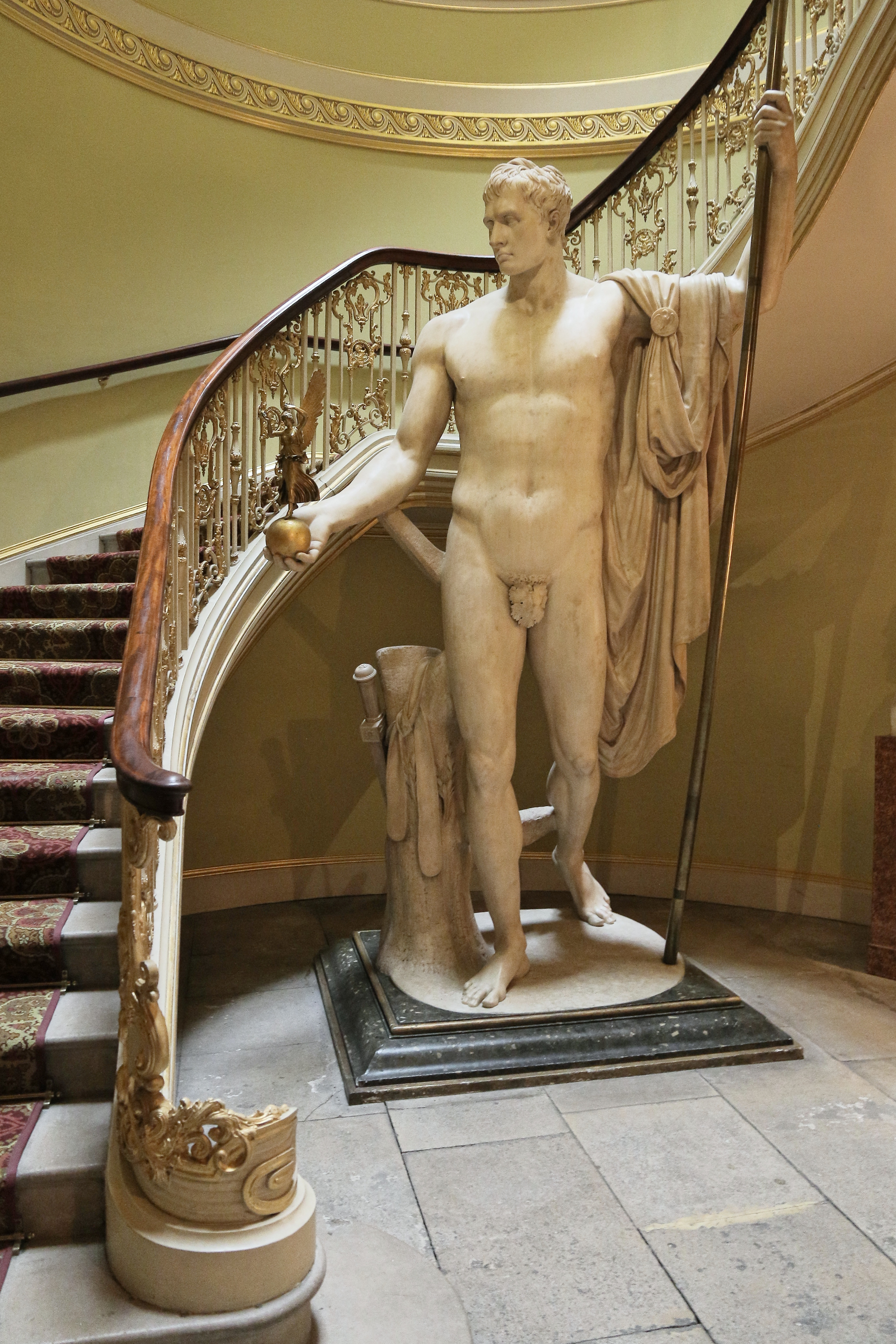
Napoleon as Mars the Peacemaker by Antonio Canova

Napoleon's penis was allegedly amputated during an autopsy shortly after his death in 1821. The story and authenticity of the alleged item in relation to Napoleon is unverified since no primary source present at his death recounts such an incident taking place. Since 1821, the item has passed through several owners, including A. S. W. Rosenbach, who exhibited it in New York City in 1927. It was purchased by John K. Lattimer in 1977 and is still owned in his family. The preserved penis is described as resembling a "piece of leather or a small, shriveled eel".

== History ==
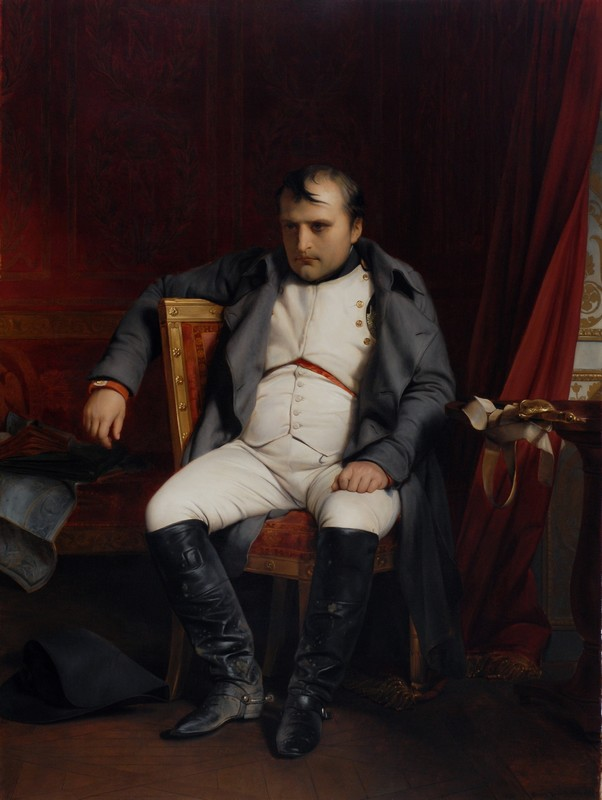
Napoleon after his abdication in Fontainebleau, 4 April 1814, by Paul Delaroche

Napoleon was exiled to Saint Helena in the Atlantic Ocean after losing the Battle of Waterloo. He died on the isle on May 5, 1821. After his death, an autopsy was conducted and some have claimed that François Carlo Antommarchi, the doctor conducting the autopsy, cut his penis off, along with several other body parts. It is unclear whether the cut was intentional or accidental. Some state that Antommarchi may have been bribed to cut it off by Napoleon's chaplain as revenge for Napoleon calling him "impotent". None of the accounts from St. Helena mention the removal of the emperor's penis and Napoleon's biographer, Philip Dwyer, calls the claim that Antommarchi cut off the penis "highly fanciful".

The alleged penis passed into the possession of Napoleon's chaplain, who smuggled it out of St. Helena to his home on Corsica. It remained in the priest's family until 1916 when Maggs Bros. Ltd., a bookselling company based in London, purchased it. In 1924, A. S. W. Rosenbach, a Philadelphia-based bookseller, purchased it.

The penis went on display in 1927 at New York City's Museum of French Art. A reviewer present at the exhibition from Time described it as similar to a "maltreated strip of buckskin shoelace". Others present considered it to look like a "piece of leather or a shriveled eel". Rosenbach sold the item to a collector named Donald Hyde, whose wife gave it to John F. Fleming after Hyde's death. Fleming was a bookseller who had been close to Rosenbach. Another collector purchased it and attempted unsuccessfully to sell the penis at an auction through Christie's. After the auction, James Comyn was reading an affidavit about Eric LeVine, a collector of items relating to Napoleon, and instead of calling the item a "penis" euphemistically referred to it as a "certain part". A urologist and artifact collector named John K. Lattimer purchased the item in 1977 for $3,000 (equivalent to $15,939 in 2025). His daughter, who inherited it upon his death, was offered at least $100,000 for it.

== Characteristics ==
The preserved penis was described by Judith Pascoe in The New York Times as "barely recognizable as a human body part" and its authenticity is unclear. While its size in life is unknown, a documentary that aired on Channel 4, Dead Famous DNA, described the current item as "very small" and measured it to be 3.8 centimetres (1.5 in). The item's current owner has allowed ten people to see it and it has never been recorded on camera.
