= Moses Polock =

American publisher and bookseller (1817–1903)

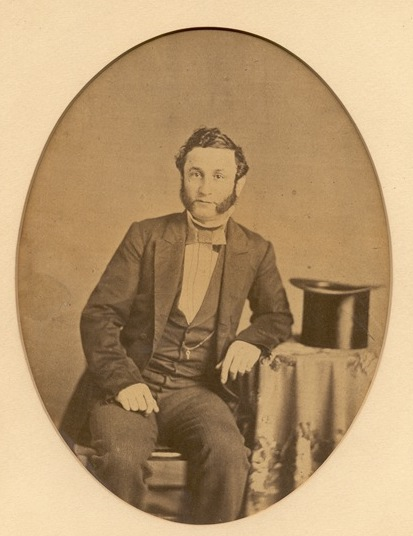
- Born: May 14, 1817; Philadelphia, Pennsylvania, US
- Died: August 16, 1903 (aged 86); Philadelphia, Pennsylvania
- Resting place: Mount Sinai Cemetery
- Occupation(s): Antiquarian bookseller, publisher
- Family: A. S. W. Rosenbach (nephew)

Moses Polock (May 14, 1817 – August 16, 1903) was a publisher and the first bookseller in the United States who dealt exclusively in rare books. At the time of his death, he was the oldest bibliophile in the country. He was Jewish.

== Early life ==
Moses Polock was born in Philadelphia on May 14, 1817. He was the fourth of twelve children to Hyman Polock (April 3, 1786 – August 15, 1870) and Rebecca Barnett (May 24, 1791 – September 5, 1884). The couple were born in Amsterdam. Polock was the son of Phineas Polock, whose ancestors are believed to have immigrated from Poland around the 17th century due to war and political unrest.

The two were wed on June 12, 1811 in London and immigrated to the United States in 1813 at the encouragement of Barnett's uncle, Aaron Levy, who possibly financed the voyage. During the trip, Barnett was pregnant with her first child.

Levy was a prominent merchant who immigrated to Pennsylvania sometime between 1760 and 1770 to trade with the native peoples and furnished supplies to the proprietary government. He was the first relative of Barnett's to come to the new world. As a creditor, Levy was a major financier of the Continental Congress during the American Revolutionary War, with his loans never fully being repaid. In 1786, he laid out a settlement in Centre County, Pennsylvania, which was later named Aaronsburg after him.

Hyman and Rebecca Polock moved to Philadelphia and were members of Congregation Mikveh Israel. Hyman worked as a jeweler and was an active member of the local Jewish Community. He was an original member of the Hebrew Society for Visitation of Sick and Mutual Assistance, founded in 1813 as the first Philadelphia Jewish mutual aid and insurance association, of which he eventually served as president. And he was one of the founders and directors of the Hebrew Education Society in 1847.

== Career ==
After attending preparatory schools, Moses Polock entered the Franklin Institute in 1828. Three years later, at the age of 14 years, he started work as a clerk at the book store McCarty & Davis, located on the north side of Market Street, near Fourth Street in Philadelphia. The business was originally founded by Jacob Johnson in 1780, only selling children's books at first. In 1800, Johnson partnered with Benjamin Warner and the business was named Johnson & Warner. In 1815, the two sold the firm to William McCarty and Thomas Davis. The new owners of the firm would be wholesale book publishers of British dramas, the works of Shakespeare and many law books. Moses would be employed by the firm for twenty years, working his way up to being its chief businessman. McCarty eventually retired and Davis would die in 1850, naming Polock as executor of his will. In it he left Polock enough money to buy the business. Polock renamed it after himself and moved it to the second floor of a red-bricked building at 406 Commerce Street. Much of the former owner's stock was auctioned off, except for what Polock kept for his new business.

As a publisher, he issued many books in fiction, drama and in general literature. Polock published new versions of Pike's Arithmetic and Oliver Goldsmith's A History of the Earth, and Animated Nature. In 1857, he published the first collected edition of the works of Charles Brockden Brown. The seven volumes were titled The first American Novelist. About this time Polock engaged in selling old and rare books and was the first dealer in the United States to exclusively deal in them, particularly in Americana. Polock was an authority on this subject and was a useful resource for both bibliographers and historians who sought his knowledge of early Pennsylvania, in particular of Philadelphia.

Notable customers of Polock's include James Lenox, the founder of the Lenox Library in New York City; John Carter Brown, whose library formed the basis of the John Carter Brown Library at Brown University; and George Brinley and the Historical Society of Pennsylvania. Other frequent visitors included James Fenimore Cooper, William Cullen Bryant, Noah Webster, Herman Melville, George Bancroft, John Eaton, George Henry Boker, Charles Godfrey Leland, Donald Grant Mitchell and Samuel W. Pennypacker. Polock was a known associate of poet Edgar Allan Poe, who visited the shop to speak of his writings in 1835. It was rumored Poe sold all remaining copies of his poorly selling Tamerlane and Other Poems to Polock for the price of a drink.

In 1895, Polock sold at auction a collection of about 50 books printed by Benjamin Franklin, the sale attracting wide attention. His nephew, A. S. W. Rosenbach, helped Polock with the sale.

== Collecting ==
Polock came into possession of several large and unique book collections throughout his life. This included the collection of Henry Hope Reed, who died in SS Arctic disaster of 1854. The Roxborough Club books, a rare collection of early English reprints, were also in his library. His fine collection of Washingtoniana was well known. While being in the book-selling business, Polock was well-known for being quite hesitant in selling his prized possessions, especially later in his life. William Brotherhead writes:

“He made little exertion as a businessman to sell his books, and because his prices are and were always fanciful. At any time after 10 o’clock in the morning you can ascend to his store; there you will find him bachelor-like all alone in his glory, breathing the atmosphere of his old books. He will meet you in the most genial manner, and will talk to you about his gems in the most intelligent spirit...“He has a rare early knowledge of men in the book business for the last forty years; but being a very reticent and diffident man, I am afraid those of the city will lose a charming lot of history about book-sellers, publishers and books. He is still in his old place, ever ready to do business with you, but is seldom visited except some old book-worm want some very scarce book or pamphlet.”

— William Brotherhead, Forty Years Among the Old Booksellers of Philadelphia With Biographical Remarks

In his obituary published in The Jewish Exponent, it was said Polock "was more of a book-lover than a dealer, and parted reluctantly, if at all, with his books." Decades after his death, one publication wrote of him saying:

"No one would ever accuse Moses Polock of avarice - he seldom sold a book at any price without afterward regretting that he sold it at all."

— Libraries Advisory Committee of University of Michigan, The Quarto (October 1943)

== Personal life ==
Polock never married nor fathered any children. He was an active member of the Jewish community, being a life long member of Congregation Mikveh Israel. At the time of his death, he was its oldest seat-holder, and perhaps the oldest native Jew in the Philadelphia area. He was also a member of Freemasons and an Odd Fellow.

Polock's youngest sister, Isabella, was the mother of A. S. W. Rosenbach. In 1885, Rosenbach began helping out in his Uncle's shop at the age of 9. It was here he would start to develop the skills vital to his future career as antique book dealer, learning how to determine book values, how to use bibliography and how to talk to collectors.

== Death ==
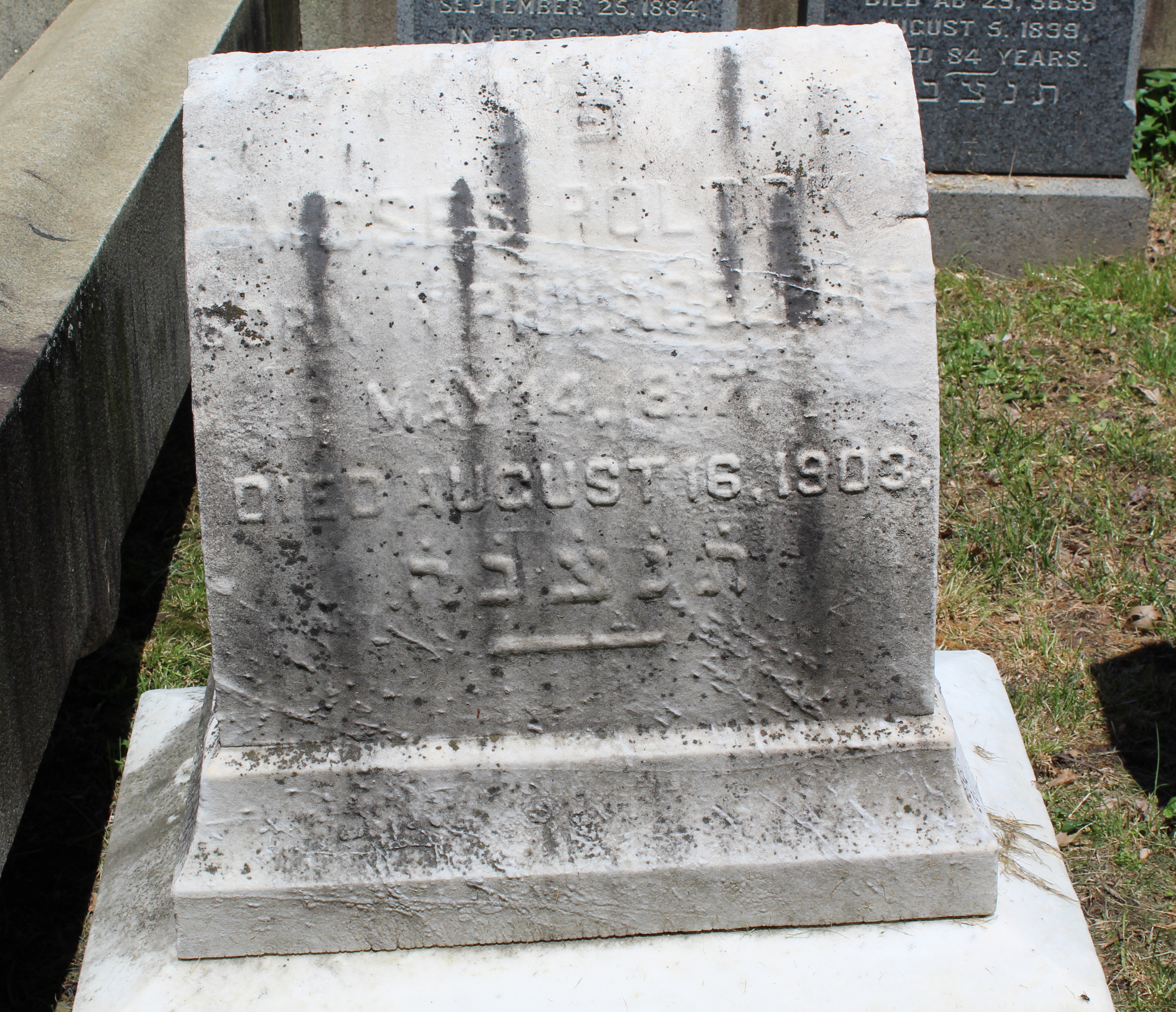
Headstone in Mount Sinai Cemetery.

Polock died on August 16, 1903, after four weeks’ of illness at the residence of his sister, Isabella Rosenbach, 1409 North Eighteenth Street, Philadelphia. At the time of his death, he was the oldest publisher and bookseller in the United States. He was buried at Mount Sinai Cemetery alongside his mother and father.

Polock left behind no will, so much of his collections was auctioned off on March 9 and 10, 1904 by Stanislaus Vincent Henkels at the book auction rooms of Davis & Harvey at 112 Walnut Street, Philadelphia. Notable items included were:

- A printing of The Aitken Bible, the first English Bible printed the United States.
- An original manuscript from John Heckewelder.
- Seven volumes of books from the library of George Washington, purchased at a sale in 1876.
- A batch of letters from eminent English and American Statesman connected with the American Revolution and addressed to John Hancock.
- The Washington Letter, in reference to the exchange of Lord Cornwallis, and the survey of a part of Mount Vernon.
- Ivory miniatures of the author Charles Brockden Brown and his wife.

Rosenbach and his brother Philip borrowed enough money from their mother to buy most of Polock's inventory at the auction, including some important Americana and early children's books. Starting at a level that would take other collectors years to reach, the brothers used the items as the base inventory of their business venture, The Rosenbach Company. Rosenbach would go on to sell a number of George Washington rarities from Polock's archive to J. P. Morgan.
