= O to Be a Dragon =

Poetry collection

O to Be a Dragon is a 1959 poetry collection by American poet Marianne Moore, as well as the title of the collection's eponymous poem. It was published by Viking Press in New York City.

It was not initially published by Faber & Faber in England, as the publisher's editor, TS Eliot, considered it too short. However, in 1964, it was combined with four additional poems and a collection that had not previously appeared in the United Kingdom and was issued as The Arctic Fox.

TIME magazine's review of O to Be a Dragon included directions to Moore's apartment, which, in her own words, led to her being "obliterated by trespassers..I might say thugs! Letters upon letters also."

== Poems ==
- "O to Be a Dragon"
- "I May, I Might, I Must"
- "To a Chameleon"
- "A Jelly-Fish"
- "Values in Use"
- "Hometown Piece for Messrs. Alton and Reese"
- "Enough: Jamestown, 1607-1957"
- "Melchior Vulpis"
- "No Better Than a "Withered Daffodil""
- "In the Public Garden"
- "The Arctic Ox (or Goat)"
- "Saint Nicholas"
- "For February 14th"
- "Combat Cultural"
- "Leonardo da Vinci's"
