= Museum of French Art =

Art museum in New York City

The Museum of French Art was an art museum in New York City, associated with the predecessor organizations to the current New York non-profit French Institute Alliance Française. It exhibited art in New York as part of a broader effort to popularize French art in the United States. The museum was active from 1911 to at least the 1930s.

== History ==
By 1911 the American division of the Alliance française, an organization aimed at expanding knowledge of French culture, had many sub-chapters. As early as 1909 the division's council had looked at ways to bring French art to popular attention. After further investigation, it was decided to found a French Institute in the United States and associated museum in New York City, with perhaps museums in other cities to follow. (The two New York non-profits remerged decades later to form the French Institute Alliance Française.) The French Institute was founded on June 14, 1911, in a meeting held at the offices of the French Ministry of Public Instruction and Fine Arts in Paris. Attendees at the meeting included André Michel, the Louvre's curator. According to another attendee, the museum would "furnish the necessary medium for popularizing French art." The founders intended for a wider institute to develop around the museum, including broader research and economic aspects. The "Museum of French Art: French Institute in the United States" had been organized by the end of 1911.

The museum opened before it acquired a building, renting galleries at the American Fine Arts Building. It first exhibited a collection of around 500 prints. The prints were engravings of Paris from the 1600s to the 1800s and were described by The New York Times as having "great" archaeological and artistic value. By 1912 the museum had galleries at 400 Madison Avenue. A 1914 exhibition of the Museum's art was held at the Architects Building. The museum organized a Manhattan exhibition of art decorating The Hague's Peace Palace in 1915 to raise money for French artists at the front of World War I. One of the paintings, Paul-Albert Besnard's La Paix par l'arbitrage, which had been loaned by the French government to the museum, went missing. It was valued at around $20,000 at the time.

The museum was later housed at 599 Fifth Avenue, along with the rest of the French Institute. It held exhibitions beginning in 1918. Most art exhibited in the museum was loaned, mostly from private collectors. Emile McDougall Hawkes directed it. Though attempts were made to fund and build a stand-alone structure, this never happened. In 1918 the museum showed Gothic art. In 1921 18th century porcelains were exhibited. An exhibition of artifacts relating to Napoleon, including his penis, his death mask, hair, and some clothes, was held in 1927. Much of the content was supplied by A. S. W. Rosenbach. An exhibition for 1931 was "Renoir and His Tradition". That same year the museum offered "Degas and the Tradition", comparing the art of Degas and his contemporaries with that of Japanese artists. In March 1931 the museum exhibited works of Braque, Fernand Léger, and Picasso.

The modern French Institute Alliance Française in New York City includes a FIAF Gallery exhibiting contemporary French and Francophone artists.
