= Rosenbach Museum and Library =

Museum and library in Philadelphia, Pennsylvania

The Rosenbach
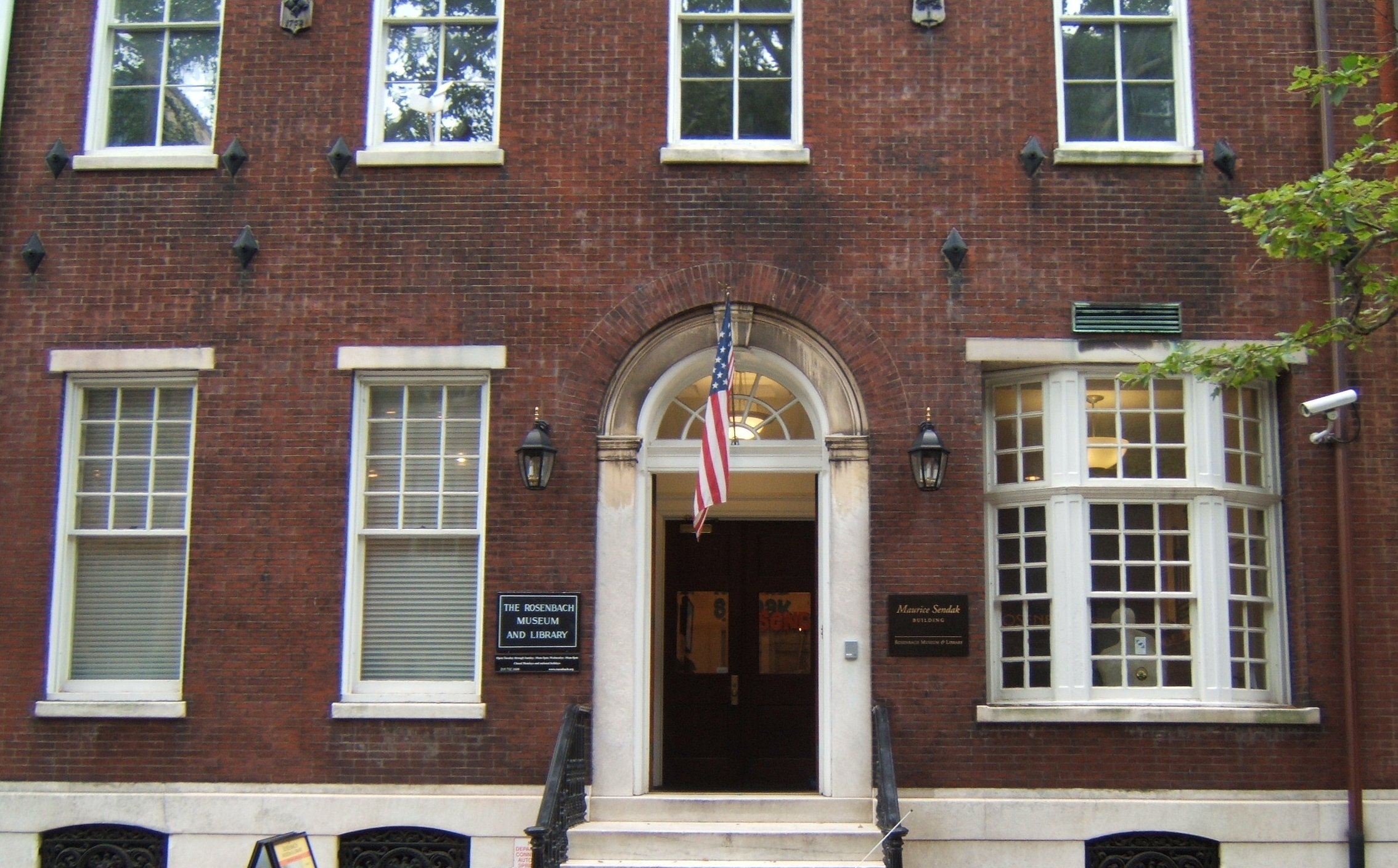
- The Rosenbach in 2009
- Established: 1954
- Location: 2008 and 2010 Delancey Place Delancey Place (Philadelphia), Philadelphia, Pennsylvania
- Coordinates: 39.9474°N 75.1751°W
- Public transit access: SEPTA bus: 17
- Website: rosenbach.org

The Rosenbach is a Philadelphia museum and library located within two 19th-century townhouses. Established as a testamentary gift in 1954, the historic houses contain the donated collections of Dr. Abraham Simon Wolf Rosenbach and his brother Philip H. Rosenbach. The Rosenbach offers virtual and on-site programs, including tours, courses, book clubs, and a free weekly web series called Biblioventures, inspired by its collection. The Rosenbach is Philadelphia's home for Bloomsday, a festival celebrating James Joyce's Ulysses every June 16.

The brothers owned the Rosenbach Company, which was a prominent dealer of rare books, manuscripts, and decorative arts during the first half of the 20th century. Dr. Rosenbach in particular was seminal in the rare book world, helping to build libraries such as the Widener Library at Harvard, The Huntington Library and the Folger Shakespeare Library. In 2013, the Rosenbach became a subsidiary of the Free Library of Philadelphia Foundation, but maintains its own board and operates independently of the public library system.

== Rare books and manuscripts from the Americana Collection ==
The Americana collection begins with accounts of early voyages and tales of exploration, which includes a copy of Antonio Pigafetta's account of Ferdinand Magellan's circumnavigation of the globe and rare tracts relating to the settlement of Virginia. The books are complemented, as is every other aspect of the collection, by manuscript material. This includes letters of Cortés, Pizarro and de Soto, including the 1532 letters of Cortés to the Council of the Indies seeking permission to form an expedition to explore the coast of California. The period of colonial settlement is well represented by early accounts and important religious tracts, particularly those relating to the various missions of Native Americans, as well as a collection of Indian Captivity Tales.

The first three extant books printed in the western hemisphere are present in the Rosenbach's collections—Mexico 1543–44, Lima 1584–85, and the legendary Bay Psalm Book, the first book printed in what is now the United States (Cambridge, Massachusetts 1661).

The American Revolution is documented with over one hundred letters written by George Washington, the original manuscript resolution of the Continental Congress, a superb collection of documents by signers of the Declaration of Independence, Commodore Barry's ship papers, which outline the beginnings of the American navy, and a set of Franklin's Poor Richard's Almanacks, including the only known surviving copy of the 1733 first edition, first printing.

The period of western expansion is represented by early diaries and traveler's accounts, printed pocket guides and histories. Of particular importance is the material dealing with the Pacific Northwest, including diaries of the Oregon pioneers and the document signed by Andrew Johnson authorizing Seward to negotiate for the purchase of Alaska.

Material from the Civil War is extensive. It consists of more than two hundred letters of Abraham Lincoln, one hundred and fifty war letters of Ulysses S. Grant, two of Robert E. Lee's letters and the original Resolution signed by both houses of the United States Congress proposing the Thirteenth Amendment to the Constitution, which abolished slavery.

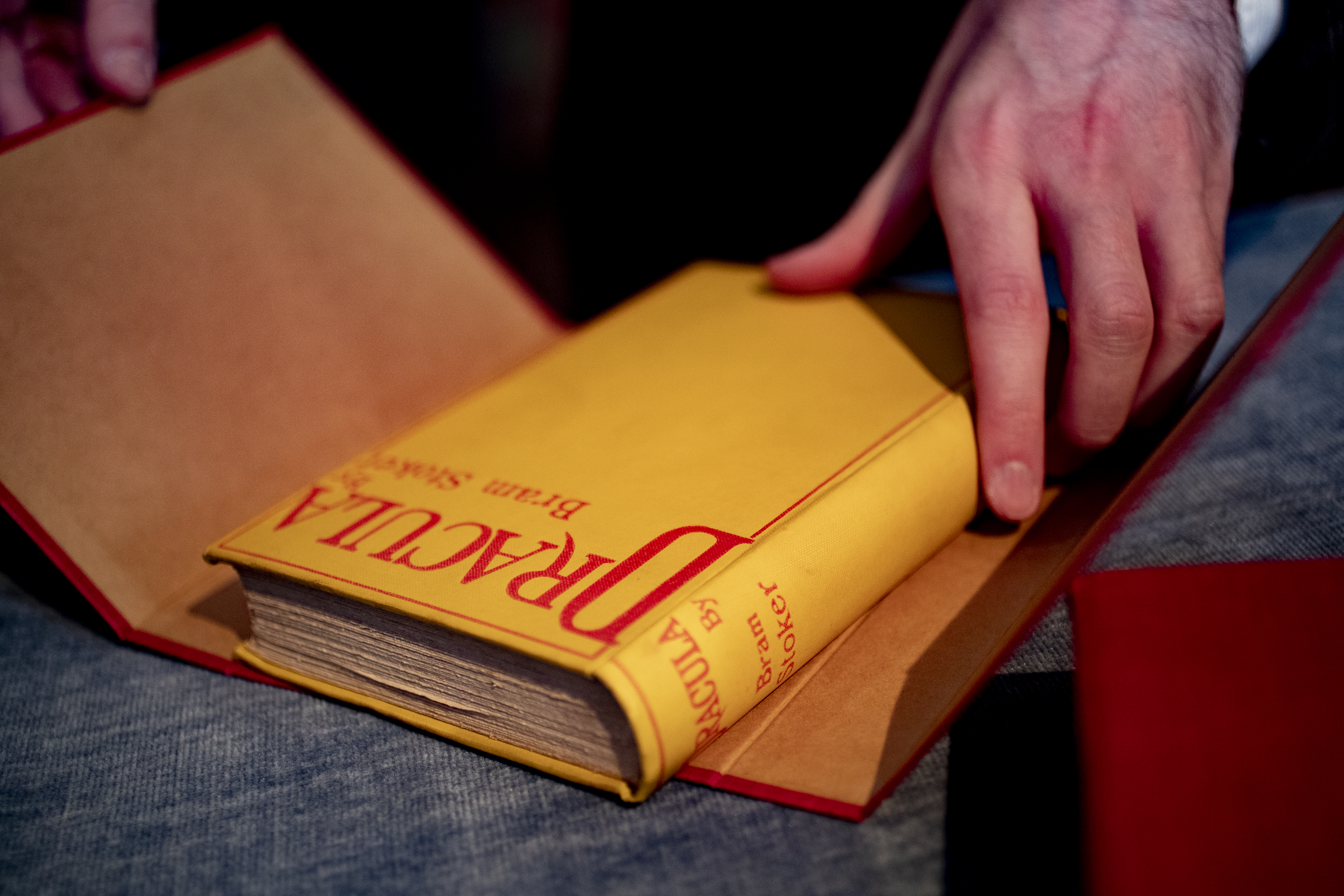

== Irish, British, and American literature ==
Chronologically this collection begins with a fine group of English literary manuscripts from the 15th century including Thomas Hoccleve's poems (1410) which contain a celebrated portrait of Chaucer. There is a major manuscript of the Canterbury Tales and a noble fragment of another illustrated version. A small and equally choice collection of books of the pre-Elizabethan and Elizabethan period is complemented by a collection of commonplace books. There is an extremely rare first edition of Pilgrim's Progress which was first owned by one of Bunyan's acquaintances from debtors' prison.

The majority of major British authors from the 18th century are represented by first editions of their more important works, and many of them by manuscript material as well. Some highlights are Tonson's assignment copy of Milton's Paradise Lost, a group of Thomas Gray's letters, five leaves of the manuscript of James Boswell's Life of Johnson and the most extensive collection of Robert Burns manuscripts in existence.

As you enter into the 19th and 20th centuries the collection strengthens. There are manuscripts of Walter Scott, William Wordsworth, Charles Lamb, Shelley and Keats (including a celebrated love letter to Fanny Brawne) and the only surviving fragment of Fitzgerald's Rubaiyat of Omar Khayyam. The Rosenbach also has a supreme Dickens collection extending from the earliest extant manuscript to a carte-de-viste photo signed on the day before his death. The collection also includes Dickens' manuscripts of Nicholas Nickleby and the Pickwick Papers. Lewis Carroll is represented by over six hundred letters, early drawings, presentation books, photographs and his own first-edition copy of Alice in Wonderland. Other manuscripts include the work of Oscar Wilde, Aubrey Beardsley, Arthur Conan Doyle, Joseph Conrad and Dylan Thomas.

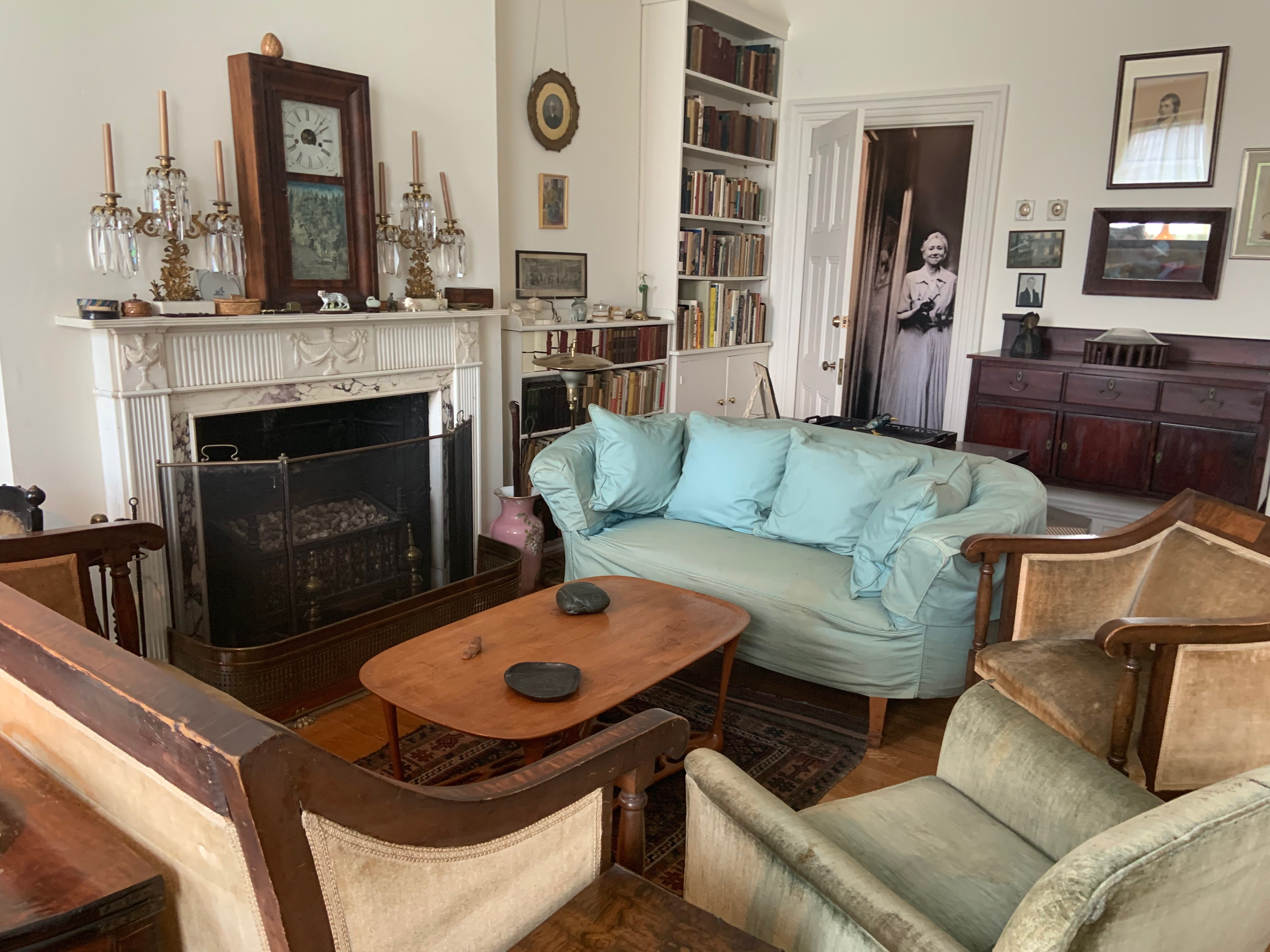
Recreation of Marianne Moore's living room at Rosenbach.

One of the museum's most valuable items is the handwritten manuscript of James Joyce's Ulysses. In honor of the work, the museum hosts a Bloomsday celebration every year, including readings from excerpts of the book.

Also included at the Rosenbach is recreation of Marianne Moore's living room just as she lived in it. It was in this room that she lived and worked for more than forty years. Moore's complete library, with many personally inscribed and annotated books from her friends and contemporaries including Ezra Pound, T.S. Eliot and Elizabeth Bishop, is part of the Rosenbach collections as well as all of her correspondence and drafts of her poetry and unpublished memoirs.

== Book illustration ==
The archive of book illustration contains many fine medieval illuminations and drawings by the great 18th-century French masters such as François Boucher, Jean-Honoré Fragonard, Jean-Baptiste Le Prince and Hubert Gravelot.

- An important group of pencil drawings, watercolors and books by William Blake.
- Drawings to illustrate Don Quixote by Honoré Daumier, Gustave Doré, Claude Joseph Vernet, Eugène Lami, and Salvador Dali.
- Drawings by Thomas Rowlandson and George Cruikshank.
- Sketches by William Makepeace Thackeray for his own work.
- John Tenniel's drawings for Alice and Through the Looking Glass
- Aubrey Beardsley, and Ernest Shepard.

== Decorative arts collections ==
The greater part of the house is furnished much as the Rosenbach brothers lived in it. The furniture is mainly 18th-century English with notable examples of the work of Chippendale, Vile, Adam, Hepplewhite and Sheraton. Other important pieces include an olivewood box with bronze doré mounts made for Charles II and a major Philadelphia highboy. A comprehensive collection of English silver and gold from the 17th and mid-18th centuries includes masterworks by Paul Storr, Hester Bateman and a choice group of items made for the British royal family. Over one thousand portrait miniatures are included in the collection, including one by Nicholas Hilliard of James I. Choice collections of 18th century porcelain, glass, paintings, drawings and sculpture are drawn upon to complete the furnishings.

The adjacent building, 2008 Delancey Place, was purchased by the foundation in January 1993 and allowed the museum to expand its facilities and exhibition space.

== State historical marker ==
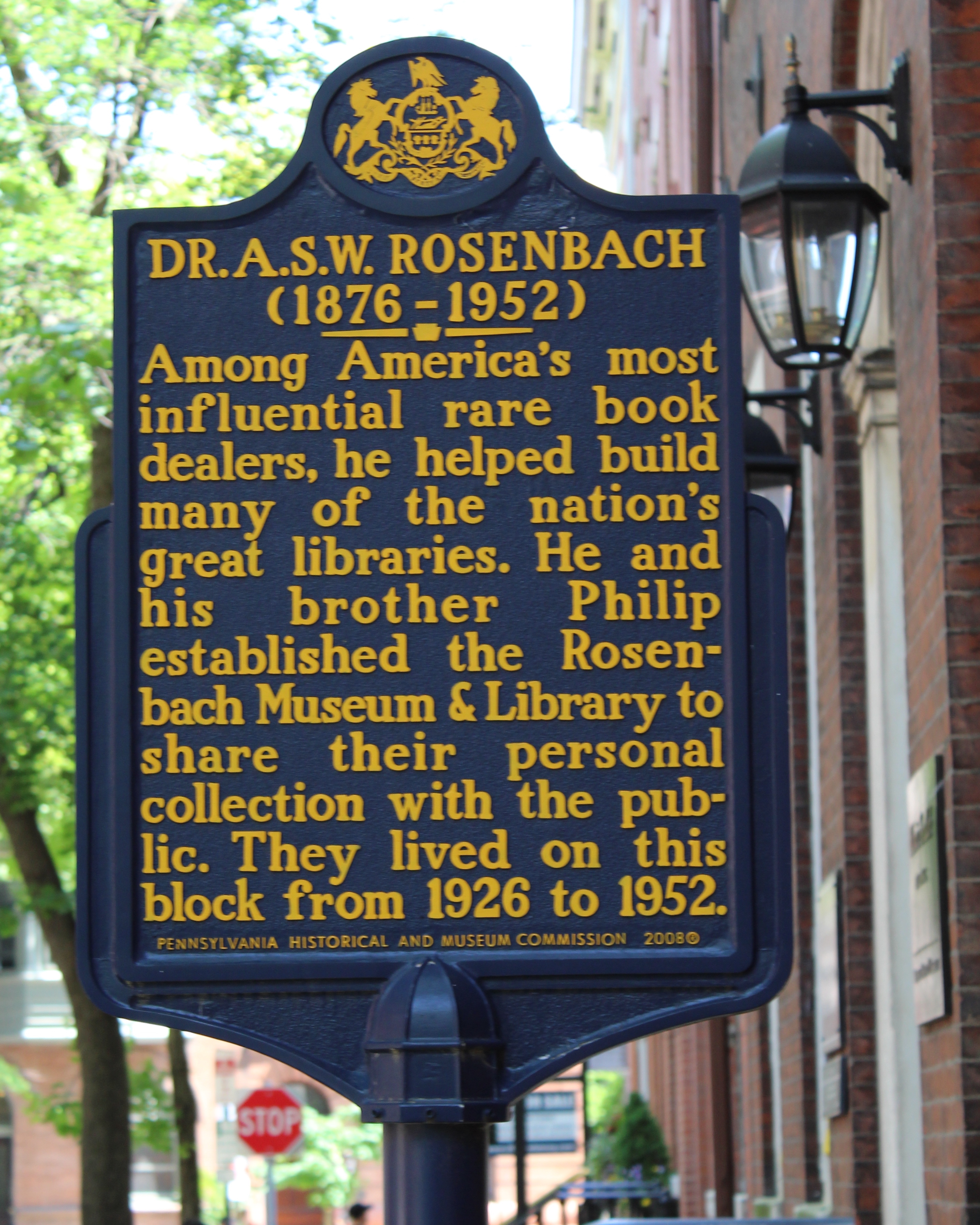
Rosenbach State Historical Marker

On April 2, 2008, the Rosenbach received an official State Historical Marker by the Pennsylvania Historical and Museum Commission in recognition of the lasting contributions of museum co-founder, Dr. A.S.W. Rosenbach. The commission commemorated Dr. Rosenbach's legacy as one of America's greatest rare book dealers and his lasting contributions to Philadelphia and beyond with a marker in front of the museum, located at 2008-2010 Delancey Place in the city's historic Rittenhouse Square neighborhood. The sign reads:

"Dr. A.S.W. Rosenbach (1876–1952) Among America's most influential rare book dealers, he helped build many of the nation's great libraries. He and his brother Philip established the Rosenbach to share their personal collection with the public. They lived on this block from 1926 to 1952."

== Maurice Sendak Collection ==
Famed author and illustrator Maurice Sendak chose the Rosenbach to be the repository for his work from 1968 to 2014 thanks to shared literary and collecting interests. His personal works were returned to his estate in 2014 and are now in the care of the Sendak Foundation. The Rosenbach is home to his rare book collection, which includes rare books by Herman Melville, Beatrix Potter, William Blake, and pop-up books by Lothar Meggendorfer. Sendak is the author and illustrator of Where the Wild Things Are and 108 other books. His collection of nearly 10,000 works of art, manuscripts, books and ephemera, has been the subject of many exhibitions at the Rosenbach and has been enjoyed by visitors of all ages.

== See also ==
- Philobiblon Club
