= L'Alliance New York =

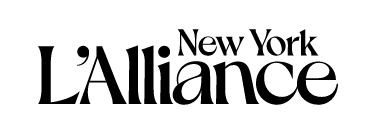
- Founded: 1898
- Type: Educational
- Purpose: Education
- Location: 22 East 60th Street, New York City
- Method: Cultural Programming and Events, Language Center, Haskell Library, FIAF Gallery
- Website: https://lallianceny.org/

L'Alliance New York, formerly French Institute Alliance Française (FIAF) is a 501(c)(3) not–for–profit organization incorporated in the State of New York. Its mission is to enhance the knowledge and appreciation of French and Francophone culture, to increase the knowledge of the French language, and to encourage interaction among French, Francophone, and American people through programs in education and the arts.

== About FIAF ==
The Alliance Française de New York was founded in 1898, and the French Institute in 1911 (running the Museum of French Art), operated as two separate organizations, the first teaching French, the second promoting French art. In 1971, they merged to form the French Institute Alliance Française (FIAF), which has become one of the largest centers of French–American culture and education in the United States.

Located on New York City's Upper East Side in a Beaux-Arts building reminiscent of the architecture of Georges-Eugène Haussmann in 19th century Paris, FIAF presents a mix of arts programs and events in addition to two cultural platforms, Crossing the Line, presented each fall, and World Nomads, presented each spring. FIAF's Language Center welcomes over 6,000 students each year who learn French from qualified professors, all of whom are native French speakers with a degree in teaching French as a foreign language. FIAF is also home to the Haskell Library, the largest private French library in the United States, and was cited by Time Out New York as one of the city's top cultural institutions.

== Cultural programming and events ==
FIAF presents a mix of programs in music, dance, theater, cinema, and visual arts in addition to two annual festivals, Crossing the Line, in the fall, and World Nomads, in the spring. FIAF also offers a variety of programs throughout the year including its longstanding weekly cinema series, CinémaTuesdays, Art de Vivre, a lifestyle series bringing the art and style of French living to New York audiences with evenings devoted to food, wine, fashion, and gardening, and the Gallery, which presents exhibitions of French and Francophone contemporary art and photography.

=== Crossing the Line ===
Crossing the Line, FIAF's fall festival, was launched in 2007 as a platform to present new works by a range of trans–disciplinary artists from both sides of the Atlantic. Initiated, conceived, and produced by FIAF in partnership with leading New York cultural institutions the festival presents original work with a specific focus on the artist's role as a thinker and catalyst for social change. Crossing the Line was curated by Lili Chopra, Simon Dove, and Gideon Lester until 2018. Courtney Geraghty was the curator from 2019 to 2021, followed by Florent Masse and Mathilde Auge for 2022 and 2023. Since 2024, Violaine Huisman is the festival’s curator.

=== Social events ===
In addition to its two annual festivals and its cinema series, FIAF hosts cultural events such as its Art de Vivre series, which focuses on the art of French living. This series includes events such as fashion talks and wine tastings, culinary workshops as well as gardening, and has brought to FIAF Catherine Malandrino, Diane von Fürstenberg, Marc Jacobs, Tommy Hilfiger, and Mireille Guiliano. Music concerts, plays, and literary talks, are also among FIAF's yearly cultural programming. Artists such as singer Jane Birkin, and actor Édouard Baer have performed in FIAF's Florence Gould Hall, and authors such as Paul Auster, Bernard-Henri Lévy, Francine du Plessix Gray, and Edmund White, have come to FIAF to discuss their respective works.

== Gala and awards ==
=== Trophee des Arts ===
FIAF established the Trophée des Arts in 1992, a gala and award ceremony honoring distinguished artists or cultural icons who have made significant contributions to French-American culture. The dinner and auctions raise funds to support FIAF’s mission to teach French and celebrate francophone cultures and creativity around the world. Notable recipients include Louis Malle, Jerome Robbins, Isabelle Huppert, Angelique Kidjo, Jeff Koons, and Jane Fonda.

Beginning in 1995, FIAF established the Pilier D’Or, also awarded during the annual Trophée des Arts gala and dinner, which recognized select individuals who made a lasting impact lasting impact on the development of the organization. Beginning in 2006, the Pilier d’Or began recognizing a leading business figure for their outstanding contributions to the French-American relations.

=== Past recipients and presenters of the Trophée des Arts ===
1992: Louis Malle Film Director.

1993: Jerome Robbins Choreographer. Presented by Corice Arman.

1994: Jean-Pierre Rampal Flutist. Presented by Liliane Montevecchi.

1995: Jessye Norman Singer. Presented by Kevin Kline.

1996: Charles Aznavour Singer/composer. Presented by Liza Minnelli.

1997: Lauren Bacall Actress. Presented by Gregory Peck.

1998: Catherine Deneuve Actress.

1999: Quincy Jones Musician/Producer. Presented by Francine Haskell.

2000: Michel Legrand Composer. Presented by François Bujon de l'Estang

2001: Jeanne Moreau Actress. Presented by François Bujon de l'Estang

2002: Christian Lacroix Fashion designer. Presented by François Bujon de l'Estang

2003: Isabelle Huppert Actress. Presented by Jean-David Levitte.

2004: No ceremony.

2005: Daniel Lamarre on behalf of Cirque du Soleil Contemporary Circus Performer. Presented by Jean-David Levitte

2006: Charlie Rose Broadcast Journalist. Presented by Bernard-Henry Levy.

2007: James Ivory Film Director. Presented by Uma Thurman.

2008: Philippe de Montebello Director of the Metropolitan Museum of Art in New York. Presented by Phyllis Collins.

2009: Robert Wilson Theater and Visual Artist. Founder of the Watermill Center. Presented by Isabelle Huppert.

2010: Marc Jacobs Fashion Designer. Presented by Anna Wintour.

2011: Alain Ducasse Chef. Presented by Stanley Tucci.

2012: Angélique Kidjo Musician. Presented by Vanessa Redgrave.

2013: François Cluzet Actor. Presented by Jean Reno.

2014: Jacques Grange Interior Designer. Presented by Barbara Gladstone.

2015: Françoise Gilot Painter and Writer. Presented by Charlie Rose

2016: Jeff Koons Artist. Presented by Larry Gagosian.

2017: Peter Marino Architect. Presented by Janine Hill

2018: Jane Fonda Actress and Activist. Presented by Sam Waterston.

2019: Charlotte Gainsbourg Actress and Musician. Presented by Anne-Claire Legendre.

2020: No ceremony.

2021: Marc Levy Writer. Presented by Susanna Lee.

2022: Jean Reno Actor. Presented by Matthew Broderick.

2026: Marion Cotillard Actress.

=== Past recipients of the Pilier D’Or award ===
2006: Bertrand Collomb Chairman of Lafarge

2007: Pierre Bellon Chairman and Founder of Sodexo

2008: Jean-Bernard Lévy CEO of Vivendi

2009: Bernard Poussot Retired Chairman, President and CEO of Wyeth

2010: Christophe de Margerie Chairman and CEO of Total.

2011: Paul Desmarais, Jr. Chairman of Power Corporation of Canada

2012: Thierry Breton CEO of ATOS

2013: Carlos Ghosn Chairman and CEO of Renault-Nissan Alliance.

2014: Fabrice Grinda Internet Entrepreneur

2015: Alexandre de Juniac Chairman and CEO of Air France-KLM

2016: Jean-Paul Agon Chairman and CEO of L’Oreal.

2017: Sidney Toledano President and CEO of Christian Diot Couture

2018: Sébastian Bazin Chairman and CEO of AccorHotels

2019: Dominique Sénéquier President of Ardian

2020: No ceremony.

2021: Pierre-André de Chalendar Chairman of Saint-Gobain

2022: Dr. Ilham Kadri CEO and President of the Executive Committee of Solvay

=== Art de Vivre ===
Established in 2014, FIAF’s Art de Vivre Award recognizes influential leaders from the food, wine, beauty, and fashion industries for their outstanding contributions to the promotion of the French art of living.

=== Past recipients of the Art de Vivre award ===
2014: Elisabeth Holder Raberin and Pierre-Antoine Raberin Co-presidents of Ladurée USA

2015: Frédéric Malle Perfume Expert

2016: Martine and Prosper Assouline Founders of Assouline

2017: Carine Roitfeld Fashion Editor

2018: Frédéric Fekkai Founder & CEO of FEKKAI Brands

2019: Ariane Daguin CEO of D'Artagnan

2020: No ceremony.

2021: No ceremony.

2022: Anne Fontaine and Ari Zlotkin Fashion Designer

2023: The Chantecaille Family – Founders of Chantecaille

2024: Laure Hériard Dubreuil - Founder of The Webster

== Events ==
=== Events en français ===
While most of the events at FIAF are held in English, many events, such as the social event Rendez–Vous, FIAF's annual celebration of Beaujolais Nouveau and Bastille Day, are held in French and offer opportunities to speak French and meet Francophiles

== Florence Gould Hall ==
Florence Gould Hall
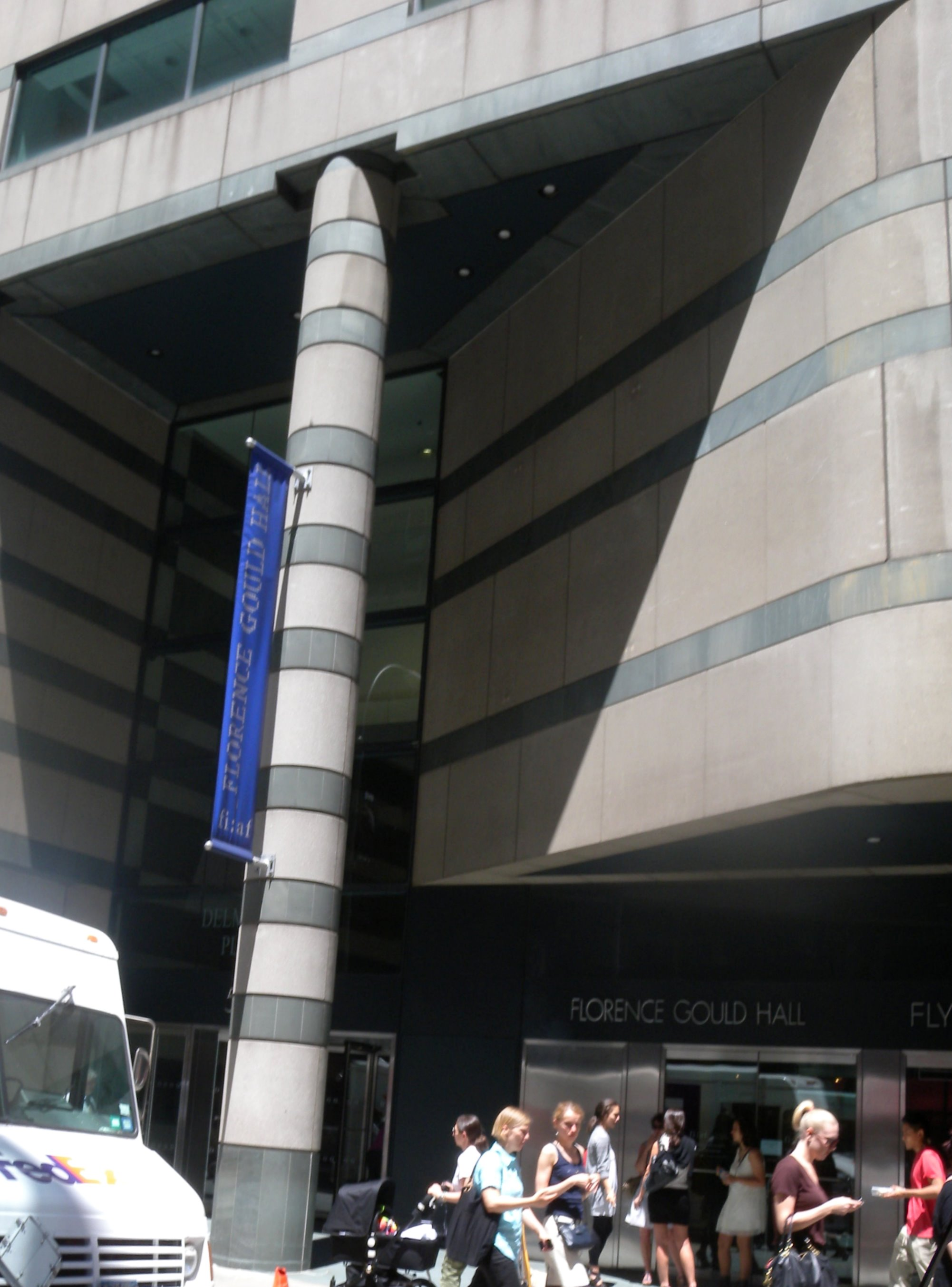
- Interactive map of Florence Gould Hall
- Address: 55 East 59th Street
- Location: New York City
- Coordinates: 40°45′48.58″N 73°58′15.07″W
- Owner: French Institute Alliance Française
- Seating type: Stadium seating
- Capacity: 361
- Type: concert hall

Construction
- Opened: 1988
- Renovated: 2012

Florence Gould Hall is a 361-seat, proscenium stage theatre and concert hall operated by the French Institute Alliance Française at 55 East 59th Street (between Madison and Park Avenues). It opened in the spring of 1988.

It is often the site of New York Theatre Ballet productions such as the Nutcracker, but is mostly home to French cultural events, as per the mission of FIAF.

== Language Center ==
The Language Center attracts over 6,000 students each year, offering courses at all levels from toddlers to adults, including, among others, thematic courses and corporate instruction. The Language Center has offered classes in New York City since 2008 and also offers instruction in Montclair, New Jersey.

== Haskell Library ==
Completely renovated by architect Michael Graves in 1998, FIAF's Haskell Library offers over 40,000 books, magazines, CDs, and DVDs for both adults and children. The library is accessible to FIAF members and students only.

== Family programs ==
FIAF hosts educational and family programs such as French movies for kids with Cinékids, as well as Contes et Confettis and à petit pas story hours with stories and creative arts and crafts workshops.

== FIAF Gallery ==
Since 2007, the FIAF Gallery has been exhibiting contemporary French and Francophone artists such as Arman, Visual System, Greg Lauren, Ryoji Ikeda, and Matthew Pillsbury.
