= Eight Poems =

Poetry collection

Eight Poems is a 1962 poetry collection by the American poet Marianne Moore, with illustrations by Robert Andrew Parker. It was published by the Museum of Modern Art in New York City. Only 195 copies were produced; each was signed by Moore and Parker.

Each of Moore's poems in the volume was accompanied by an image from Parker. In his 2001 book Material Modernism: The Politics of the Page, the literary critic George Bornstein commented on the juxtaposition of Moore's poem "The Fish" and Parker's drawing in Eight Poems. Bornstein wrote that "One can no longer interpret "The Fish" as military reinforcements in the First World War; they steadfastly remain the delicate creatures of Parker's accompanying watercolor. A poem that started out as an anti-military poem in an anti-war journal has metamorphosed into a commodified (sic) aesthetic object".

== Poems ==
- "The Plumet Basilisk"
- "The Fish"
- "'He Digesteth Harde Yron'"
- "A Jelly-Fish"
- "New York"
- "The Pangolin"
- "The Monkeys"
- "Nevertheless"
