= Delancey Place =

Series of streets in Philadelphia

Coordinates: 39.9476°N 75.1759°W

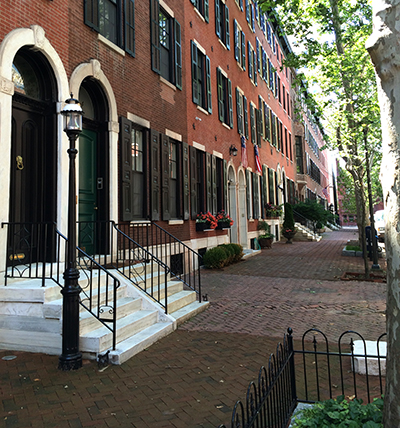
Sidewalk on south side of the 1800 block of Delancey Place

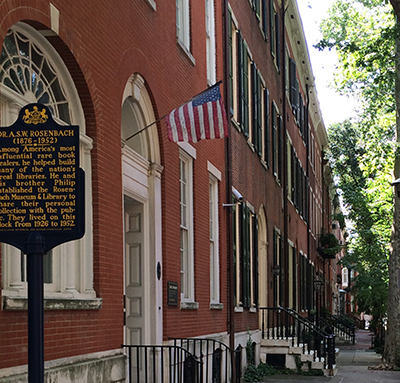
The 2000 block of Delancey Place with Rosenbach Museum in foreground

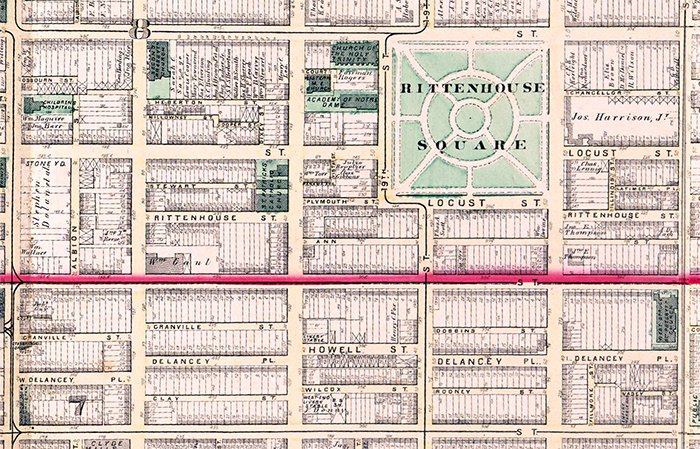
Rittenhouse Square area of Philadelphia in 1875, a decade after the Civil War, showing most of Delancey Place already established

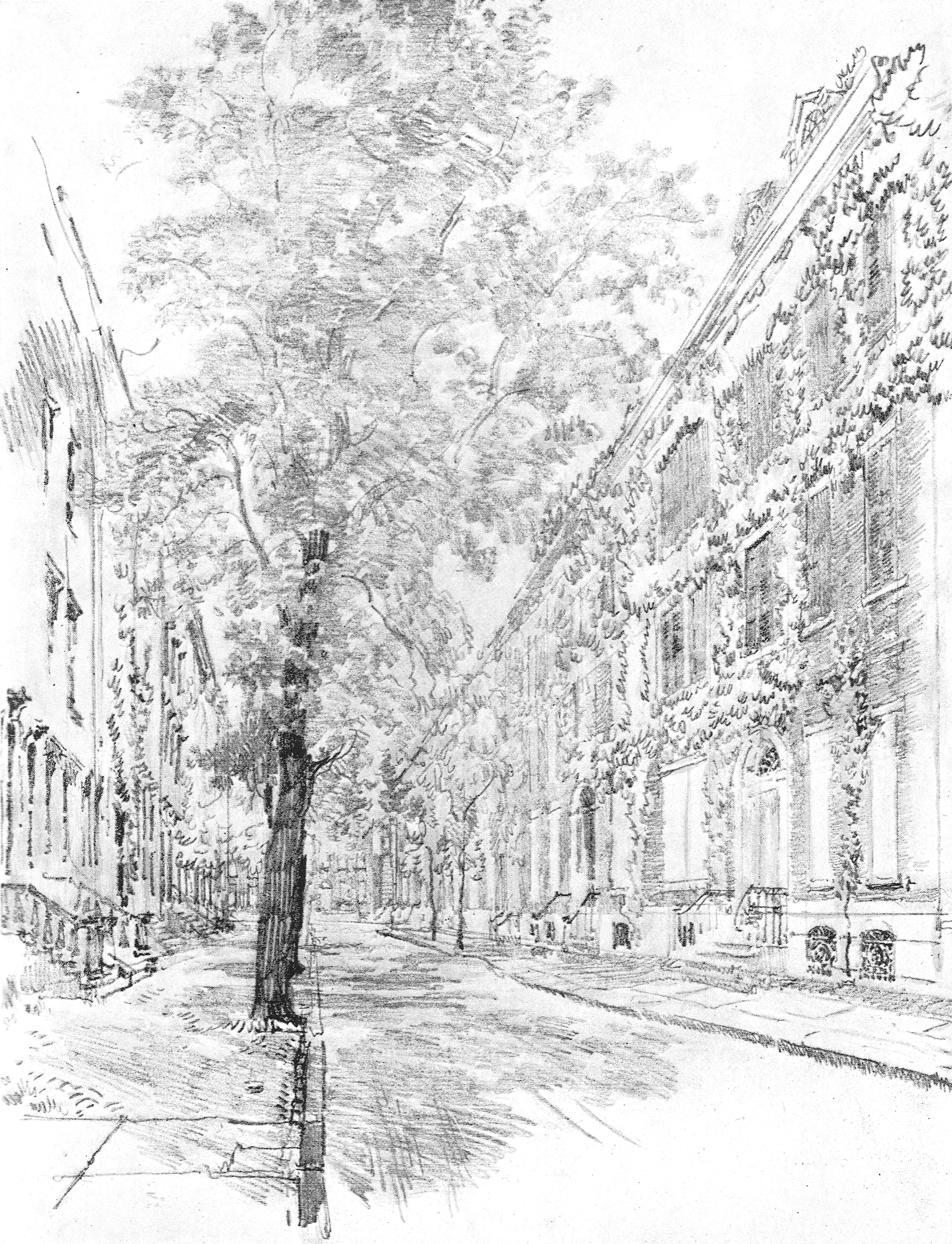
Earliest illustration of Delancey Place's 2000 block, looking east (Pennell, 1914)

Delancey Place in Philadelphia, Pennsylvania, is a series of nine mostly unconnected side streets in the Rittenhouse area of the city between 17th and 26th Streets. It is known for its visual appeal and historical association with the upper class of Philadelphia society. This is especially true of the 1800 and 2000 blocks, lined with American Civil War–era mansions that have changed little in appearance over the years. There are similar mansions on other streets in the Rittenhouse area, including those on Pine, Spruce, and Locust Streets, but many have converted to apartment buildings and those streets have become more urbanized.

Notable residents have included General George Meade (no. 1836) who defeated Robert E. Lee’s Confederate forces at the Battle of Gettysburg, the Rosenbach brothers (nos. 2008–2010 Delancey Place) who played a central role in developing the most important collections of rare books in the United States, as well as presidents and CEOs of some of the largest companies in the city and country. The 2000 block of Delancey Place, is the ‘most filmed residential block’ of Philadelphia.

== History ==
=== 19th century ===
Philadelphia expanded into the rural areas west of Broad Street during the 19th century, and especially during the middle decades (~1840–1870). With some minor adjustment, the original grid of streets designed by William Penn in 1683, was already in place, but side streets were needed to accommodate houses. Delancey Place originated during this active time, being named for William Heathcote DeLancey (1797–1865), provost of the University of Pennsylvania (1828–1834) and a bishop of the Episcopal Church. The initial portion (1800 block) was called De Lancey Place. Residents refused to change the suffix (‘Place’) after the city legislated the change to ‘Delancey Street” in 1895, so the city eventually changed it back to ‘Delancey Place’ in 1941.

The 1800, 2000, and 2100 ‘Federal’ blocks comprise mostly Civil War–era houses built in the style of the earlier Federal Period (1785–1815) and are characterized by red brick facades, white marble trim, and semicircular fanlights above doorways. Most of the original houses remain today, especially on the 1800 and 2000 blocks where they are palatial in size, giving those blocks a historical atmosphere. The 1800 block opened during the years 1853–1855 followed by construction of an initial row of nine houses (nos. 1800–1818) in 1857 and the entire block was complete and occupied by the end of 1860. The 2000 block opened in 1860 and is 25% longer than typical blocks in Philadelphia, a holdover from the early symmetrical grid of the city, having a wider block near each river. A row of nine houses (nos. 2000–2018) listed in the National Register of Historic Places was complete and occupied by 1864. The Rosenbach Museum is located in two of these (nos. 2008–2010). After a short pause in construction for several years, the rest of the 2000 block was completed by circa 1870 and included some red brick houses, especially on the north side, with brownstone trim and bracketed window hoods, thus mixing Federal and Second Empire (Victorian) styles. Several houses were faced in all white marble, including 2019 Delancey which was owned by Nobel Laureate Pearl S. Buck in the 1950s and 1960s. Overall, houses on the 1800 and 2000 blocks are similar in having four stories (five in the case of the white marble houses), but the top floors on the 2000 block (some added later) are set back with dormers, giving an illusion of 3-story houses and allowing more light on the street. Houses in the 2100 block, initially called ‘Walter Street’, were built during 1859–1865, starting with the north side. They also have mostly Federal-style houses, but are somewhat smaller and more variable, reflecting subsequent changes.

The 1700 and 1900 carriage house blocks were used for businesses and stables during the nineteenth century, delaying development. Those carriage houses likely serviced the mansions on the 1800 and 2000 blocks. The 1700 block was ‘Cox Street’ on early maps and was in place by 1838. Plays and Players Theatre, at 1714 Delancey Place, originally called ‘Little Theatre of Philadelphia’, is one of the oldest professional theater companies in the United States, founded in 1911. Actor Kevin Bacon performed there as a child in 1974. The 1900 block was in place by 1849 as ‘Howell Street’ with a paper factory occupying the entire north side, and with various small houses and stables on the south side. Directories in the late 1850s show residents of Howell Street being classified as laborers, suggesting that the original small houses were boarding houses. By the mid-1870s, nearly all of those houses were gone, converted to liveries and stables. Most of the current houses on these blocks were built in the early twentieth century (1910-1923), after the stables were removed, although one of the original carriage houses remains, at no. 1718.

The short 2200 and 2300 ‘Victorian’ blocks were built in the 1870s, with houses characterized by bay windows, stone trim, and bracketed window hoods. The 2200 block was a large railroad yard with stables as late as 1875, but was soon thereafter (circa 1879) developed by William Weightman. At the time it was called ‘Trinity Place,’ in reference to the adjacent Holy Trinity Chapel on Spruce Street. By 1884, it was complete and occupied. The 2300 block appeared as an eastward extension of Factory Street in 1862, with no houses. It was gone by 1874, but reappeared in 1875 as West Delancey Place with all houses constructed, and by 1884 all houses were occupied. Each block has two styles of houses built at the same time and arranged in a symmetrical pattern down the block: one with a red brick facade lacking street-side bay windows and the other with a brownstone facade having stone-framed bay windows (engraved with ornamentation above).

The 2400 and 2500 ‘Schuylkill’ blocks, also short, are near the Schuylkill River and have a shared history in being ‘Factory Street’ in the nineteenth century, with mostly warehouses and stables, as early as 1840. The 2400 block had small brick houses as early as 1860 and some of those remain, although current houses are a mix of styles and ages. The 2500 block now has ten luxury townhouses on the south side of the street, built in 2005, with Schuylkill River Park on the north side.

== Delancey Place versus Delancey Street ==
Delancey Place has only been used for streets in the Rittenhouse area between 17th and 26th Streets. In an effort by the city to simplify street names in 1895, however, several side streets across the city, between Spruce Street and Pine Street, were renamed to Delancey Street, including streets formerly called Delancey Place. It affected some streets that had gone by other names since the late eighteenth century such as Union Street. The effort was successful for the low-numbered blocks between Front Street and Eighth street, and the high-numbered blocks between 34th and 63rd Streets. The attempted change was a failure for the original blocks of 'Delancey' in the Rittenhouse area, however, where residents refused to adopt the change, and continued to use the name Delancey Place as their address in directories, despite most street maps using the name Delancey Street.. Finally, the city reversed their decision in 1941 and recognized ‘Delancey Place’ as the official name for streets between Seventeenth Street and Twenty-sixth Street that they had called ‘Delancey Street’ in 1895, as well as fixing the spelling of 'Delancey' to a lower case 'l'. Although the Philadelphia city government recognizes "Delancey Place" on their official street map, as does Google Maps, other businesses and agencies do not, including the United States Postal Service and major real-estate web-listing companies such as Zillow, Trulia, and Redfin, which still use ‘Delancey Street’ instead of ‘Delancey Place’, or a hybrid of the two names for the blocks between Seventeenth Street and Twenty-sixth Street.

== In popular culture ==
Scenes from at least six movies and a television show were filmed on Delancey Place and all on the 2000 block, which is Philadelphia’s most filmed residential block. In the films and the show, the main characters live in real houses on the block, in nos. 2006, 2014, 2032, 2036, and 2037 Delancey Place.

In Trading Places (1983), a poor street hustler named Billy Rae Valentine (played by Eddie Murphy) trades places with the managing director of a brokerage firm, Louis Winthorpe III (played by Dan Aykroyd), who lives at 2014 Delancey Place. Jamie Lee Curtis plays Ophelia, a prostitute befriended by Winthorpe. In one scene, the Rolls-Royce carrying Billy Rae drives down the street, depicting the federal architecture (as seen from above) and pulls in front of the house.

In The Sixth Sense (1999), Bruce Willis plays a child psychologist, Malcolm Crowe, who was shot in his house, 2006 Delancey Place, by a former patient. In one scene, Malcolm stands in front of the old, federal houses with arched doorways on the street, at night.

The Answer Man (2009) is a romantic comedy starring Jeff Daniels, who plays a world-famous author who ends up dating an overprotective single mother, played by Lauren Graham; Lou Taylor Pucci plays a bookstore owner. The movie was filmed on the 2000 block and inside Arlen’s home at 2032 Delancey Place.

How Do You Know (2010) is a love triangle comedy that includes scenes filmed at Rittenhouse Square and on the 2000 block of Delancey Place, although the exact location is not obvious. It stars Reese Witherspoon, Jack Nicholson, Owen Wilson and Paul Rudd.

The Best and the Brightest (2010), starring Neil Patrick Harris and Bonnie Somerville, is about a young couple’s efforts to place their daughter in an elite school. Many scenes were filmed on the 2000 block of Delancey Place, including inside and outside the home of the characters at no. 2037.

One scene in Split (2016) by M. Night Shyamalan takes place in the middle of the 2000 block of Delancey Place where psychologist Dr. Karen Fletcher (played by Betty Buckley) is shown walking to her house.

Jimmy Smits’s character in the television show Outlaw (2010), a Supreme Court justice, lived at 2036 Delancey, which appears in the pilot episode.

The opening sequence in the television show Angie was said to have been filmed at 1823 Delancey Place.

Scenes in several other movies, including Rocky II (1979) starring Sylvester Stallone, Mannequin (1987) starring Andrew McCarthy and Kim Cattrall, In Her Shoes (2005) starring Cameron Diaz, Shirley MacLaine, and Toni Collette, and The Happening (2008) starring Mark Wahlberg, were filmed a few streets away in nearby Rittenhouse Square. The exceptional use of this one city block by the movie and television industry relates to the history and aesthetics of Delancey Place, and cultural setting as an idyllic city street. For example, in Trading Places, it was used to convey the great wealth of the main character while in The Answer Man, the aesthetic of the street was used in a strolling scene, where the two main characters were interacting.
