= Matthew Pillsbury =

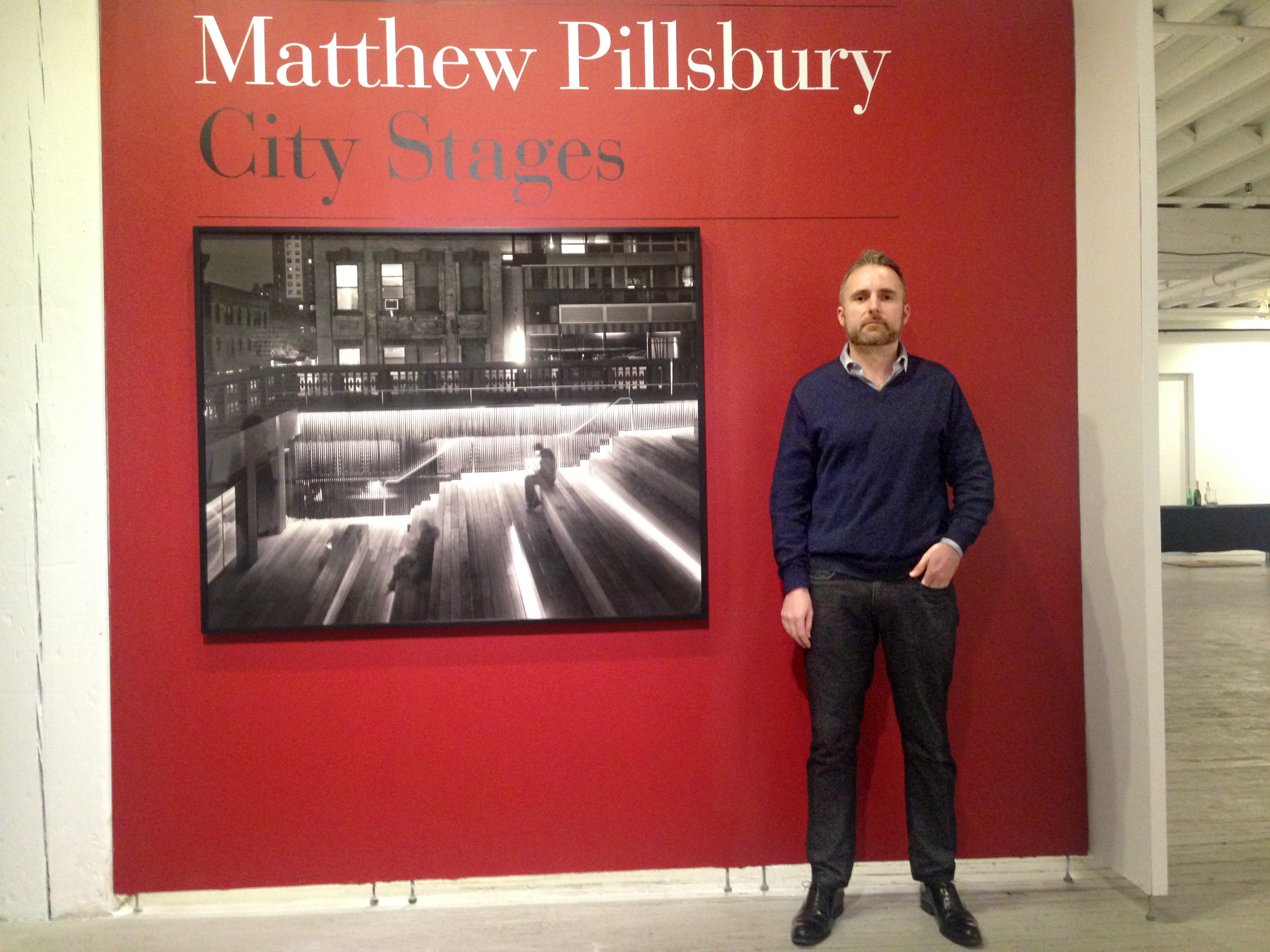
Pillsbury at the opening of the City Stages exhibition at Aperture Foundation Gallery, 2014

Matthew Pillsbury (born November 25, 1973) is a French-born American photographer, living in New York City.

The Screen Lives series, inspired by Sugimoto's movie theater photos, features black and white, long-exposure photographs of family and friends sitting in their apartments interacting with their computer and television screens.

In 2004 The New York Times Magazine commissioned him to do a portfolio of photos of New York museums after hours. One such photo was taken at the Guggenheim Museum: An installation in progress in the Ronald O. Perelman Rotunda (October 1, 2004.)

In addition to New York, he continued to shoot within museums in both London and Paris, including the Musée du Louvre. At the Louvre he photographed the Mona Lisa.

== Early life ==
Pillsbury was born in Neuilly, France to Henry and Judy Pillsbury, Americans who moved to France in the mid-1960s.

Born wealthy, Pillsbury's great, great grandfather Charles Alfred Pillsbury was a U.S. flour industrialist and founded the Pillsbury Company in 1872. At age 10, Pillsbury had his only film role in the movie Le Bon Plaisir alongside actress Catherine Deneuve, who played his mother.

== Work ==
The New York Times and the Aperture Foundation published New York Times Photographs in the fall of 2011, featuring one of his photos of the American Museum of Natural History's Rose Center For Earth and Space.

In the Dec 11, 2011 issue of New York Magazine, Pillsbury's works were published as part of their "Reasons to Love New York 2011" feature. The photos included four shots from City Stages, which included Occupy Wall Street protesters in Zuccotti Park, as well as "Jing Fong dim sum", "Fausto in Washington Square Park" and "High Line."

Works in the City Stages series include the Macy's Thanksgiving Day Parade, the Inflation of Thanksgiving Day Parade balloons from the American Museum of Natural History, Woody Allen and the Eddy Davis New Orleans Jazz Band at Cafe Carlyle, the Reading Room at the New York Public Library, Jazz at the Lincoln Center, the Broadway musical "Book of Mormon," a contortionist at Big Apple Circus, the Brooklyn Bridge Park and Jane's Carousel, New York Stock Exchange and the Tribute of Light at the World Trade Center as viewed from the Brooklyn Heights Promenade. The New York Times Magazine blog The 6th Floor overviewed the series and featured seven photos.

His series, City Stages initially ran from February 23, 2012 to April 28, 2012 at the Bonni Bunrubi Gallery in New York City. The exhibition opened in Atlanta, GA on September 13, 2012 and ran until November 17, 2012 at The Jackson Fine Art gallery. In September 2013, the Aperture Foundation published a monograph that includes a retrospective of his works, titled, City Stages. The New York Times Magazine published one of Pillsbury's City Stages photos as part of their Manhattanhenge feature in July 2013. Art Relish conducted an interview in October 2012 with him discussing his City Stages works. In the Oct 1, 2012 edition of Time Magazine, "High Line" photo, featuring a park in Manhattan constructed of abandoned train tracks, was highlighted as part of his exhibit at the Jackson Fine Art gallery.

The Screen Lives series, inspired by Sugimoto's movie theater photos, features black and white, long-exposure photographs of family and friends sitting in their apartments interacting with their computer and television screens.

On the CNN Photos Blog, Pillsbury's Screen Lives series was featured in a post about the School of Visual Arts "Myths & Realities" show, which took at the Visual Arts Gallery in New York, Aug 29-Sept 29, 2012. On November 27, 2011, New York Times Magazine featured two of Pillsbury's photos of Jane's Carousel from "City Stages."

In April 2014, Pillsbury was one of 11 photographers awarded with the John Simon Guggenheim Memorial Foundation Fellowship. Approximately 200 Fellowships are awarded each year through two annual competitions that receive between 3,500 and 4,000 applications. Guggenheim Fellowships are grants awarded to "advanced professionals in mid-career" who have demonstrated exceptional ability by publishing a significant body of work within the fields of natural sciences, social sciences, humanities and the creative arts, excluding the performing arts.

In 2014, Pillsbury photographed various cities in Japan, with the focus being in and around Tokyo. Recent photographs from his work in Tokyo were revealed in a photo essay published on July 18, 2014 in The New York Times Magazine and include images from Tokyo Disneyland, Robot Restaurant and the CupNoodles Museum in Yokohama. In April 2014, The New York Times Magazine first ran a photo essay of Pillsbury's work that centered around the hanami parties that occur during the week when the cherry blossoms are at peak bloom. An exhibition of His new Tokyo work opened Sept 10, 2014 and closed November 15, 2014 in New York City at Benrubi Gallery.

A portfolio of Pillsbury's new images was featured in The New Yorker in September 2015, and showcased locations that include the High Line, the American Museum of Natural History, Astoria Park Pool and the Coney Island Boardwalk. He has also widened the project's focus to include locations outside of Manhattan, after a move to Brooklyn in January 2015 that inspired him to shoot urban life in the outer boroughs.

In a redesign and relaunch in the February 22, 2015 issue, The New York Times Magazine published a photograph Of his on its cover. The long exposure image featured an illuminated spinning globe, which he took in his basement.

He is represented exclusively by Edwynn Houk Gallery in New York.

== Publications ==
- Time Frame. Actes Sud; Fondation HSBC pour la Photographie, 2007. ISBN 978-2742768349
- City Stages. New York City: Aperture Foundation, 2013. ISBN 978-1597112376.
