= Marianne Moore =

American poet (1887–1972)

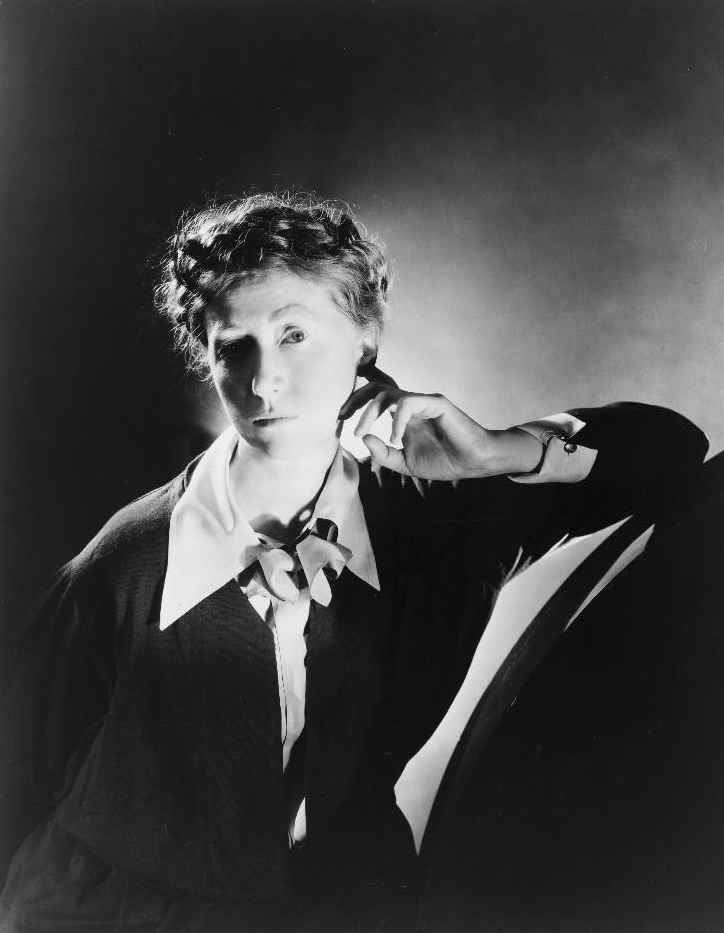
- Photograph by George Platt Lynes (1935)
- Born: November 15, 1887; Kirkwood, Missouri, U.S.
- Died: February 5, 1972 (aged 84); New York City, U.S.
- Education: Bryn Mawr College (BA)
- Occupation: Poet
- Writing career
- Notable awards: National Book Award (1951); Pulitzer Prize (1951); Bollingen Prize (1951); Edward MacDowell Medal (1967); National Medal for Literature (1968)
- Movement: Modernism

Marianne Craig Moore (November 15, 1887 – February 5, 1972) was an American modernist poet, critic, translator, and editor. Her poetry is noted for its formal innovation, precise diction, irony, and wit. Her Collected Poems (1951) won the National Book Award and the Pulitzer Prize for Poetry.

== Early life ==
Moore was born in Kirkwood, Missouri, in the manse of the Presbyterian church where her maternal grandfather, John Riddle Warner, served as pastor. Her father, John Milton Moore, a mechanical engineer and inventor, suffered a psychotic episode, as a consequence of which her parents separated before she was born; Moore never met him. She and her elder brother, John Warner Moore, were reared by their mother, Mary Warner Moore. The family wrote voluminous letters to one another throughout their lives, often addressing each other by playful nicknames based on characters from The Wind in the Willows and using a private language.

Like her mother and her brother, Moore remained a devoted Presbyterian, strongly influenced by her grandfather, approaching her Christian faith as a lesson in strength vindicated through trials and temptations; her poems often deal with the themes of strength and adversity. She thought "it was not possible to live without religious faith". Moore lived in the St. Louis area until she was six. After her grandfather died in 1894, the three stayed with relatives near Pittsburgh for two years, then moved to Carlisle, Pennsylvania, where her mother found employment teaching English in a private girls school.

Moore entered Bryn Mawr College in 1905. She graduated four years later with an A.B., having majored in history, economics, and political science. The poet H.D. was among her classmates during their freshman year. At Bryn Mawr, Moore started writing short stories and poems for Tipyn O'Bob, the campus literary magazine, and decided to become a writer. After graduation, she worked briefly at Melvil Dewey's Lake Placid Club, then taught business subjects at the Carlisle Indian Industrial School from 1911 to 1914. One of her students was Jim Thorpe. She recalled, "He had a kind of ease in his gait that is hard to describe. Equilibrium with no stricture, but couched in the lineup of football he was the epitome of concentration, wary, with an effect of plenty in reserve."

== Poetic career ==
Moore's first professionally published poems appeared in The Egoist and Poetry in the spring of 1915. Harriet Monroe, the editor of the latter, would describe them in her biography as possessing "an elliptically musical profundity".

In 1916, Moore moved with her mother to Chatham, New Jersey, a community with commuting transportation to Manhattan. Two years later, the two moved to New York City's Greenwich Village, where Moore socialized with many avant-garde artists, especially those associated with Others magazine. The poems she was writing at that time received high praise from Ezra Pound, William Carlos Williams, H.D., T. S. Eliot, and later, Wallace Stevens.

Moore's first book, Poems, was published without her permission in 1921 by the Imagist poet H.D. and H.D.'s partner, the British novelist Bryher. Moore's later poetry shows some influence from the Imagists' principles.

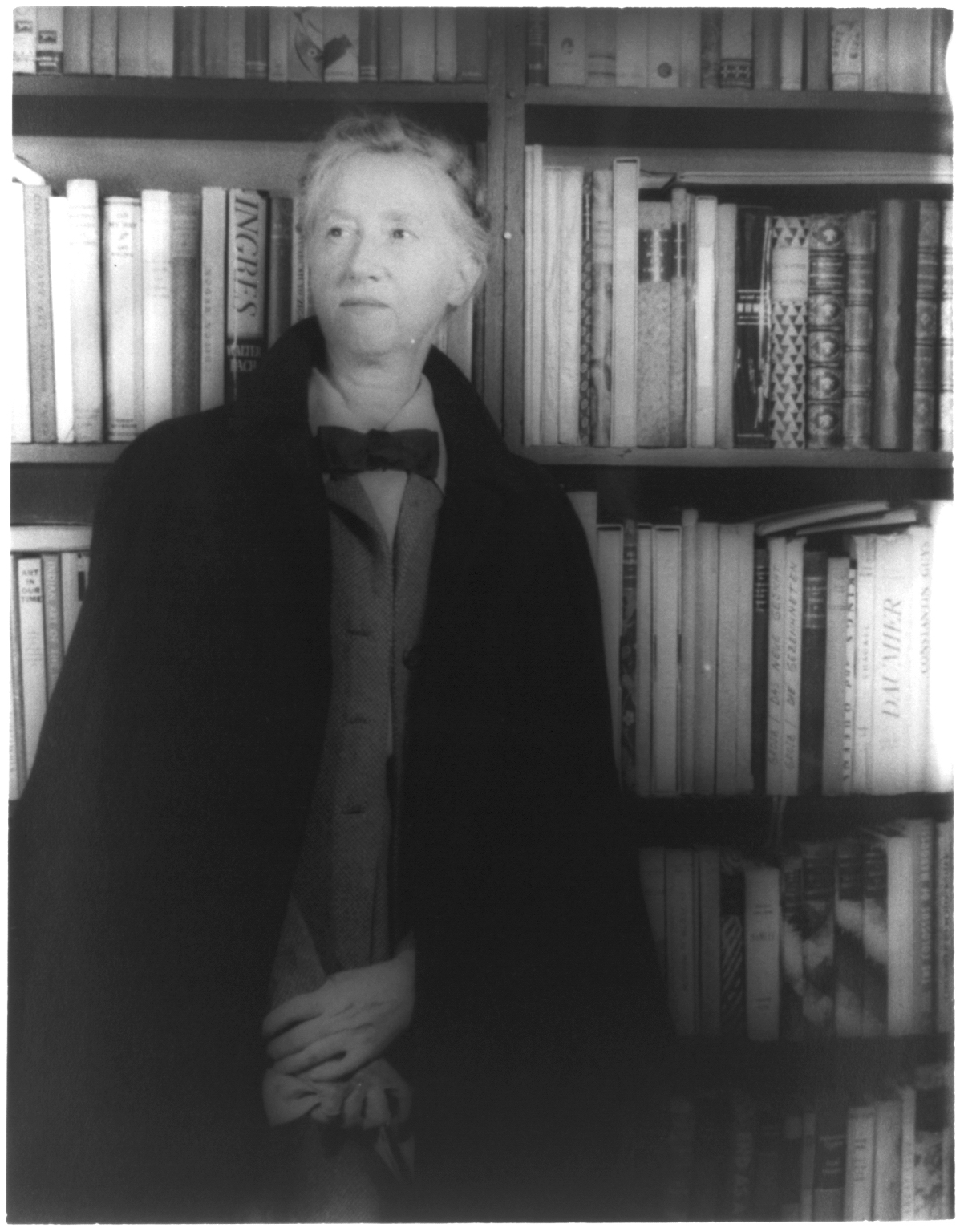
Photograph by Carl Van Vechten (1948)

Her second book, Observations, won the Dial Award in 1924. She worked part-time as a librarian; from 1925 to 1929, she edited The Dial, a literary and cultural journal. This position in the literary and arts community extended her influence as an arbiter of modernist taste; much later, she encouraged promising young poets, including Elizabeth Bishop, Allen Ginsberg, John Ashbery, and James Merrill. When The Dial ceased publication in 1929, she moved to 260 Cumberland Street in the Fort Greene neighborhood of Brooklyn, where she remained for thirty-six years. She continued to write while caring for her ailing mother, who died in 1947.

Poetry magazine awarded Moore the Helen Haire Levinson Prize in 1933 and the Ernest Hartsock Memorial Prize two years later. In 1951, her Collected Poems won the National Book Award, the Pulitzer Prize, and the Bollingen Prize. In the book's introduction, T. S. Eliot wrote, "My conviction has remained unchanged for the last 14 years that Miss Moore's poems form part of the small body of durable poetry written in our time." After years of seclusion, she emerged as a celebrity, speaking at college campuses across the country and appearing in photographic essays in Life and Look magazines. Moore became a member of the American Academy of Arts and Letters in 1955. She was elected a Fellow of the American Academy of Arts and Sciences in 1962 and in 1967 she was awarded The Edward MacDowell Medal by The MacDowell Colony for outstanding contributions to American culture. Moore continued to publish poems in various magazines, including, The Nation, The New Republic, Partisan Review, and The New Yorker, as well as publishing various books and collections of her poetry and criticism.

She moved to 35 West Ninth Street in Manhattan in 1965. After moving back to Greenwich Village, she was widely recognized around town for her tricorn hat and black cape. She liked athletics and was a great admirer of Muhammad Ali, writing the liner notes for his spoken-word album I Am the Greatest!. She became known as a baseball fan, first of the Brooklyn Dodgers and then of the New York Yankees. She threw out the ball to open the season at Yankee Stadium in 1968.

At the age of 81, Moore received the 1968 National Medal for Literature. The committee overseeing the award stated: "One of the few true inventors of poetry in our time, Marianne Moore, the first lady of poetry, gives us intimations of exquisite perfection."

Moore suffered a series of strokes in her last years. She died in 1972, and her ashes were interred with her mother's at the family's burial plot at the Evergreen Cemetery in Gettysburg, Pennsylvania. By the time of her death, she had received many honorary degrees and virtually every honor available to an American poet. The New York Times printed a full-page obituary. In 1996, she was inducted into the St. Louis Walk of Fame.

Moore corresponded with Ezra Pound from 1918 onward and visited him regularly during his incarceration at St. Elizabeth's. She opposed Benito Mussolini and Fascism from the start and objected to Pound's antisemitism. Moore was a Republican and supported Herbert Hoover in 1928 and 1932. She was a lifelong ally and friend of the American poet Wallace Stevens, as demonstrated in her review of Stevens's first collection, Harmonium, and, in particular, by her comment about the influence of Henri Rousseau on the poem "Floral Decorations for Bananas". She also corresponded, from 1943 to 1961, with the reclusive collage artist Joseph Cornell, whose methods of collecting and appropriation were much like her own.

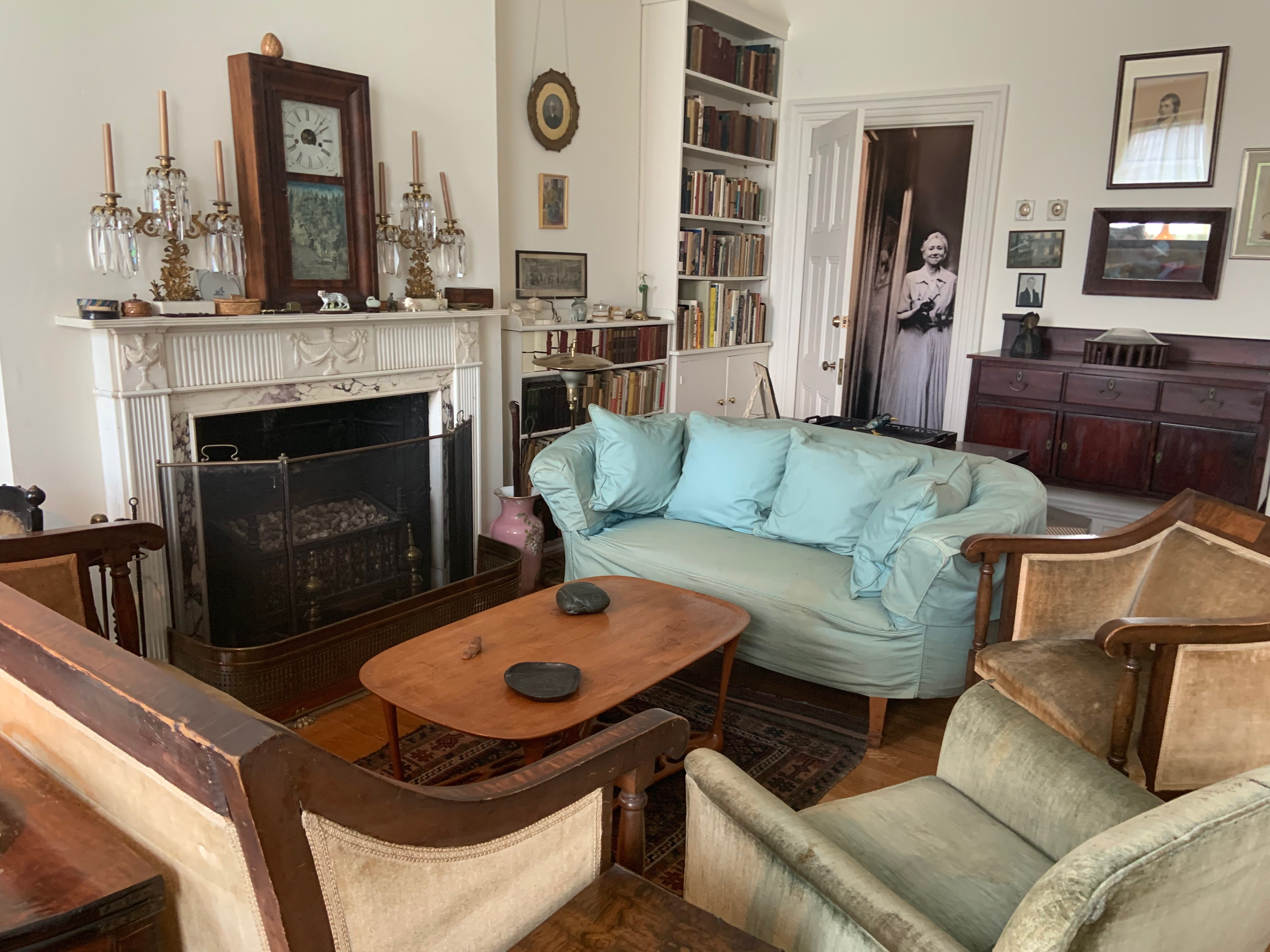
Recreation of Moore's living room

In 1955, Moore was invited informally by David Wallace, manager of marketing research for Ford's "E-car" project, and his co-worker Bob Young, to suggest a name for the car. Wallace's rationale was "Who better to understand the nature of words than a poet?" In October 1955, Moore was approached to submit "inspirational names" for the E-car, and on November 7, she offered her list of names, which included such notables as "Resilient Bullet", "Ford Silver Sword", "Mongoose Civique", "Varsity Stroke", "Pastelogram", and "Andante con Moto". On December 8, she submitted her last and most famous name, "Utopian Turtletop". The E-car was christened by Ford as the Edsel.

Moore never married. Her living room has been recreated in its original layout in the collections of the Rosenbach Museum and Library in Philadelphia. Her entire library, knick-knacks (including a baseball signed by Mickey Mantle), all of her correspondence, photographs, and poetry drafts are available for public viewing.

Like Robert Lowell, Moore revised many of her early poems in later life. Most of these revised works appeared in the Complete Poems of 1967. Facsimile editions of the theretofore out-of-print 1924 Observations became available in 2002. Since that time, there has been no critical consensus about which versions are authoritative. As Moore wrote, as a one-line epigraph to Complete Poems, which offered her well-known work "Poetry" cut down from twenty-nine lines to three: "Omissions are not accidents." In a foreword to A Marianne Moore Reader in 1961, Moore said her favorite poem was the Book of Job.

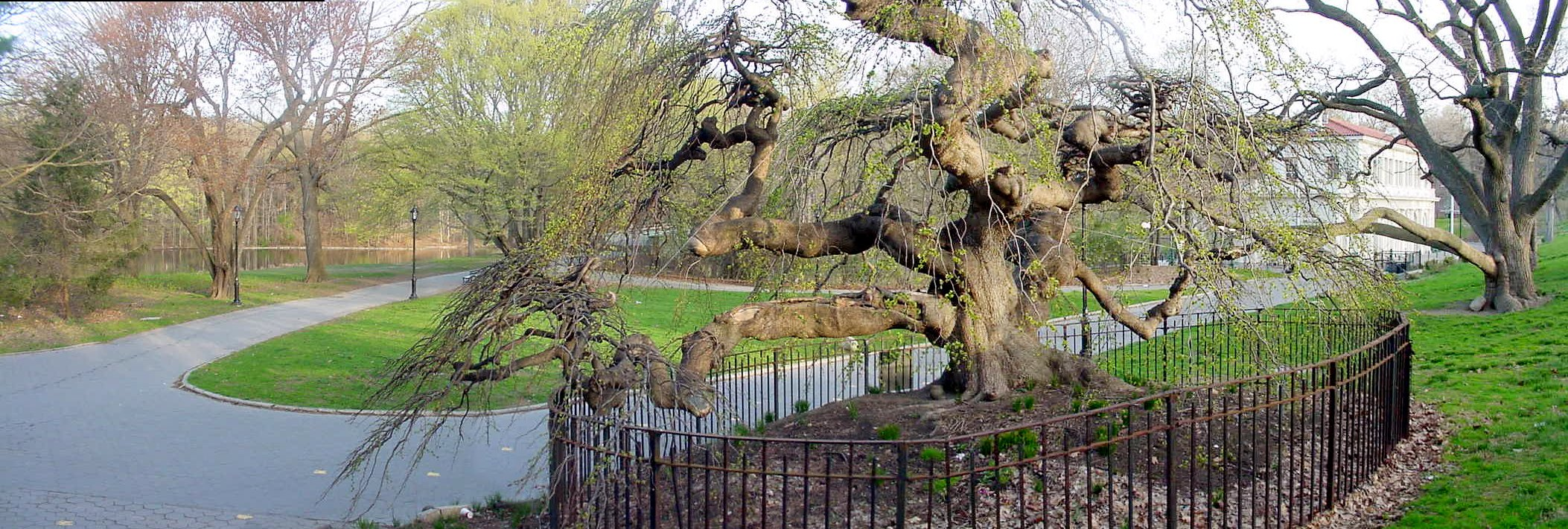
The Camperdown elm in Prospect Park, which benefits from a fund established in Moore's will

Moore's novel and an unfinished memoir have not been published. In her will, she established a fund for the support of the Camperdown Elm in Brooklyn's Prospect Park, a rare and ancient tree that she had celebrated in a poem.

In 2012, she was inducted into the New York State Writers Hall of Fame.

== Style ==
Moore's most famous poem is perhaps "Poetry", in which she praises poets who create "imaginary gardens with real toads in them". It also asserts that meter and other traditional poetic devices are not as important as delight in language and precise, heartfelt expression. (Moore wrestled with "Poetry" for decades: the poem has 11 versions, was printed 27 times and published 79 times between 1919 and 1982.) Moore's meter was radically separate from the English tradition; writing her syllabic poems after the advent of free verse, she was encouraged thereby to try previously unused meters.

She credited the poetry of Edith Sitwell as "intensifying her interest in rhythm and encouraging her rhythmic eccentricities". In response to a biographical sketch in 1935, Moore indicated "a liking for unaccented rhyme, the movement of the poem musically is more important than the conventional look of lines upon the page, and the stanza as the unit of composition rather than the line". Later in her Selected Poems of 1969, she also commented in regard to her poetic form, that "in anything I have written, there have been lines in which the chief interest is borrowed, and I have not yet been able to outgrow this hybrid method of composition".

Moore often composed her poetry in syllabics; she used stanzas with a predetermined number of syllables as her "unit of sense", with indentation underlining the parallels, the shape of the stanza indicating the syllabic disposition, and her reading voice conveying the syntactical line. These syllabic lines from "Poetry" illustrate her position: poetry is a matter of skill and honesty in any form whatsoever, while anything written poorly, although in perfect form, cannot be poetry:

…; nor is it valid
to discriminate against "business documents and

school-books": all these phenomena are important. One must make a distinction
however: when dragged into prominence by half poets, the result is not poetry

== Translations ==
Moore translated the seventeenth-century Fables of La Fontaine into English. Hugh Kenner asserted that she had accomplished the task "with incomparable deftness."

== Musical adaptations ==
Though not as widely set to music as the work of other poets, there have been musical adaptations by several American composers, including pieces by Samuel Adler, William Bolcom, Juliana Hall, Lewis Spratlan, and Virgil Thomson.

== Involvement in the American suffrage movement ==
Moore and her mother, painted by Marguerite Zorach in 1925

Moore was involved in the American suffrage movement starting in her university years at Bryn Mawr, from 1905 to 1909. During this time in the American suffrage movement, Anna Howard Shaw had just taken over as president of the National American Woman Suffrage Association; Harriot Stanton Blatch formed the Equality League of Self Supporting Women, which started the practice of suffrage parades; and soon (in 1910) women in the state of Washington were granted the right to vote.

Moore's combined major in history, politics, and economics and the suffrage involvement of professors and other students at Bryn Mawr exposed her to the women's suffrage movement, especially because it was a "unique period in the history of women's college, as the values of progressivism, women's education, and the ideology of separate spheres came together in a kind of perfect storm that created a climate for cultural change". Moore was involved in a "suffrage society", a chapter of the National College Equal Suffrage League, and she was present at most of their events. Notably, Moore wrote in her personal letters to her family that she attended lectures at Bryn Mawr by the well-known feminist Jane Addams and the British suffragette Anne Cobden-Sanderson. Of the American suffragist Anna Howard Shaw, she wrote: "Miss Shaw spoke last night on the Modern Democratic ideal. I couldn't say how she delighted me. No decent, half-kind, creature could possibly think of fighting suffrage if he or it had heard her arguments."

Moore visited New York City in 1909 with another Bryn Mawr student, where she heard a lecture by the Colorado suffragist Judge Ben Lindsey, went to a suffrage mass meeting, and saw J. M. Barrie's classic suffragist-themed play What Every Woman Knows. There is speculation that Moore also participated in the women's suffrage parade of 1913 in Washington, D.C., one day before Woodrow Wilson's presidential inauguration. Although in her personal letters she told her brother, Warner, that she did not participate in the parade after he cautioned her about the possible dangers she would face from the opponents of the parade, "[h]er scrapbook includes programs and newspaper clippings about the march", and she later told the poet Elizabeth Bishop that she "paraded with the suffragettes, led by Inez Milholland on her white horse".

Moore was never as public about her involvement in the suffrage movement after that parade in 1913, because afterward she began participating anonymously, mostly through writing, using a pseudonym. During her stay in Carlisle, Pennsylvania, she admitted years later, she "wrote suffrage pieces for the Carlisle newspaper", which at the time appeared to be authored anonymously. Dr. Mary Chapman (University of British Columbia) argues that Moore was the writer of suffragist writings of the time in Carlisle news publications and that could be analyzed by examining her specific writing style alongside suffragist prose and poetry that were published in the Carlisle Evening Herald in 1915: "Many of the prosuffrage articles that appeared in the Herald exhibit Moore's characteristic reliance on quotation." Additionally, a letter appealing for the women's suffrage movement in the Carlisle Evening Sentinel is signed "Miss M.M.", which scholars believe could stand for Marianne Moore because "the absence of any other documented unmarried female suffragists in the Carlisle area with the initials M.M. make it likely that the Sentinel reader who coyly constructs a letter to the editor almost entirely from quotation is Marianne Moore". Moore's poem "Silence" (1924) also resembles the writing style that was seen in the Sentinel letter. Moore established herself on the surface as a modernist poet, and the common practice within the modernist circle of poets was to not engage with the politics of the time; but her writings displayed a "sophisticated political subtext".

== Selected works ==
- Poems, 1921 (Published in London by H.D. and Bryher. Moore disapproved of the timing, editing, selections, and format of this collection. See The Selected Letters of Marianne Moore, ed. Bonnie Costello et al. (New York: Knopf, 1997), p. 164. In a letter to Bryher, Moore notes, "I wouldn't have the poems appear now if I could help it and would not have some of them ever appear and would make certain changes.")
- Observations, 1924
- Selected Poems, 1935 (introduction by T. S. Eliot)
- The Pangolin and Other Verse, 1936
- What Are Years, 1941
- Nevertheless, 1944
- A Face, 1949
- Collected Poems, 1951
- Fables of La Fontaine, 1954 (verse translations of La Fontaine's fables)
- Predilections: Literary Essays, 1955
- Like a Bulwark, 1956
- Idiosyncrasy and Technique, 1958
- O to Be a Dragon, 1959
- The Marianne Moore Reader, 1961
- Eight Poems, 1962, with illustrations by Robert Andrew Parker
- The Absentee: A Comedy in Four Acts, 1962 (dramatization of Maria Edgeworth's novel)
- Puss in Boots, The Sleeping Beauty and Cinderella, 1963 (adaptations from Perrault)
- Dress and Kindred Subjects, 1965
- Poetry and Criticism, 1965
- Tell Me, Tell Me: Granite, Steel and Other Topics, 1966
- The Complete Poems of Marianne Moore, 1967
- The Accented Syllable, 1969
- Selected Poems, 1969 (selected by Marianne Moore, published by Faber & Faber, London )
- Homage to Henry James, 1971 (essays by Moore, Edmund Wilson, et al.)
- The Complete Poems, 1982
- The Complete Prose, 1986, edited by Patricia C. Willis
- Complete Poems, 1994
- The Selected Letters of Marianne Moore, edited by Bonnie Costello, Celeste Goodridge, and Cristanne Miller, 1997
- Becoming Marianne Moore: The Early Poems, 1907–1924, edited by Robin G. Schulze, 2002. ISBN 978-0520221390.
- Poems of Marianne Moore, edited by Grace Schulman, 2003
