= City square (disambiguation) =

A City square is another name for a town square.

City square may also refer to:

- Urban park type
  - List of city squares by size
- City Square, Melbourne, Victoria, Australia
- City Square (MBTA station), Charlestown, Massachusetts, United States
- City Square (skyscraper), a skyscraper in Perth, Western Australia
- City Square Mall, Singapore
- City Square Shopping Centre, Vancouver, British Columbia, Canada
- City Square, Leeds, West Yorkshire, England, UK
- Johor Bahru City Square, a shopping Mall in Johor Bahru, Johor, Malaysia.
- Oskaloosa City Square Commercial Historic District, Iowa, United States
- Phoenix City Square, Arizona, United States

The alternate CitySquare may refer to:

- The former Worcester Center Galleria, a shopping mall complex in Worcester, Massachusetts
- CitySquare (Dallas), a non-profit social service organization in Dallas, Texas

== See also ==
- City Center Square, Kansas City, Missouri, United States
- City Square House, Leeds, West Yorkshire, England, UK
- Spring City Square, Jinan City, Shandong, China
- The City Hall Square (disambiguation)
- Town square (disambiguation)
- Public Square (disambiguation)
- Market Square (disambiguation)
- The Square (disambiguation)
- Square (disambiguation)
- Piazza (disambiguation)
- Plaza (disambiguation)
