= Market Square =

Market square commonly refers to a town or city location of open air market stalls.

Market Square may also refer to:

== Places ==
=== Europe ===
==== Finland ====
- Market Square, Hämeenlinna, Finland
- Market Square, Helsinki, Finland
- Market Square, Kuopio, Finland
- Market Square, Oulu, Finland
- Market Square, Turku, Finland

==== Ireland ====
- Market Square, Letterkenny, County Donegal

==== Ukraine ====
- Market Square (Ivano-Frankivsk)
- Market Square (Lutsk)
- Market Square (Lviv)

==== United Kingdom ====
- Old Market Square, Nottingham

=== North America ===
==== Canada ====
- Market Square, Victoria, British Columbia
- Old Market Autonomous Zone, Winnipeg, Manitoba
- Market Square (Saint John), New Brunswick

==== United States ====
- Market Square (Lake Forest, Illinois)
- Market Square Historic District (Newburyport, Massachusetts)
- Market Square (High Point, North Carolina)
- Market Square (Miamisburg, Ohio)
- Market Square, Harrisburg, Pennsylvania
- Market Square, Pittsburgh, Pennsylvania
- Market Square, Providence, Rhode Island
- Market Square Commercial Historic District (Knoxville, Tennessee)
- Market Square (Houston, Texas)
- Main Street/Market Square Historic District, Houston, Texas
- Market Square (San Antonio), Texas
- Market Square (Alexandria, Virginia)
- Fredericksburg Town Hall and Market Square
- Centre Market Square Historic District
- Market Square (San Francisco)

=== Oceania ===
==== Australia ====
- Market Square, Geelong, a shopping centre in Victoria, Australia

==== New Zealand ====
- Victoria Square, Christchurch (formerly named Market Square)

== Other uses ==
- Market Square Records, a record label

== See also ==
- Church Square, Pretoria, formerly Market Square
- City square (disambiguation)
- Town square (disambiguation)
- Public Square (disambiguation)
- The Square (disambiguation)
- Square (disambiguation)
- Market (disambiguation)
- Market Square Shopping Centre (disambiguation)
