= Public Square =

Public Square may refer to:

- Public square or town square, an open public space in many municipalities

== Locations ==
- Public Square (Watertown, New York)
- Public Square, Cleveland, Ohio
- Public Square, Tahoka, Texas, the location of the Lynn County Courthouse
- Public Square Street, Kowloon, Hong Kong

== Other ==
- "The Public Square", a 1923 poem by Wallace Stevens
- Public Square (company), a conservative American online marketplace

== See also ==
- Urban park
- Public Square Historic District (disambiguation)
- Digital public square
- Market Square (disambiguation)
- City square (disambiguation)
- The Square (disambiguation)
- Square (disambiguation)
