= Town square (disambiguation) =

A town square is an open public space commonly found in the heart of a traditional town used for community gatherings.

Town square may also refer to:

== Places ==
- Town Square (Dubai), United Arab Emirates
- Town Square (Las Vegas), upscale center development in Enterprise, Nevada, United States
- Town Square (Ljubljana), Slovenia
- Town Square (Saint Paul), mixed-use complex in Saint Paul, Minnesota, United States
- Old Town Square, Prague, Czech Republic
- Richmond Town Square, shopping mall in Richmond Heights, Ohio, United States
- George Washington Memorial Park (Jackson, Wyoming), United States, known locally as "Town Square"

== Other uses ==
- Town square test, threshold test for a free society
- Urban park type
- Townsquare Media, an American owner of several radio stations

== See also ==
- Town Hall Square, Tallinn
- City square (disambiguation)
- Public Square (disambiguation)
- Market Square (disambiguation)
- The Square (disambiguation)
- Square (disambiguation)
- Piazza (disambiguation)
- Plaza (disambiguation)
