= Market Square Shopping Centre =

Market Square Shopping Centre may refer to:

- Market Square Shopping Centre (Geelong), in Victoria, Australia
- Market Square Shopping Centre (Kitchener), in Ontario, Canada

== See also ==
- Market Square (disambiguation)
