= Westfield Geelong =

- Location: Geelong, Victoria, Australia
- Coordinates: 38.1465°S 144.3626°E
- Opened: 1988; 38 years ago
- Manager: Scentre Group
- Owner: Jointly Owned: Westfield Trust (50%); Perron Group (50%)
- Num. of stores: 187
- Num. of anchor tenants: 4 (Big W, Coles, Myer, Target)
- Floor area: 52,000 m^{2}
- Parking: 1,700
- Website: westfield.com/geelong

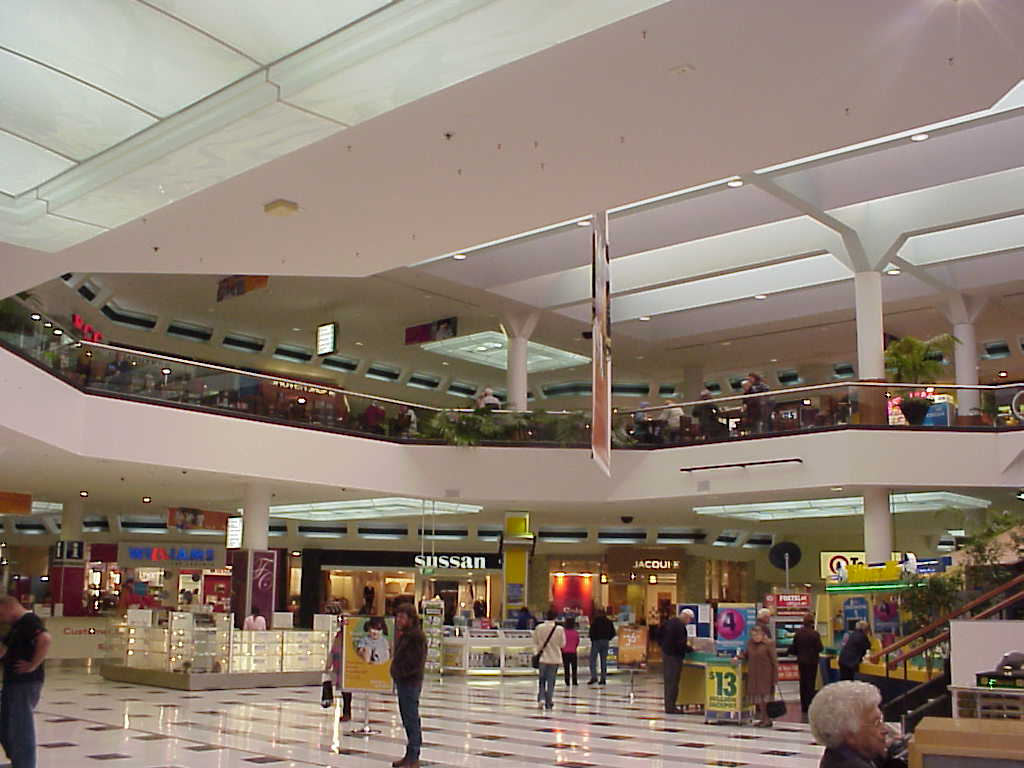
Main atrium of Westfield Geelong prior to the 2008 redevelopment

Westfield Geelong is a shopping centre located in the Geelong CBD in Victoria, Australia which was opened in 1988. It was formerly known as Westfield Bay City before the 2008 redevelopment, and as Bay City Plaza before being acquired by the Westfield Group in 2003. The centre is located on the northern side of Malop Street opposite the Market Square shopping complex (the two of which together make up Geelong's Central Shopping Complex), and is bounded by Moorabool Street, Yarra Street (although since redevelopment the centre now extends East of Yarra Street via a flyover), Malop Street and Brougham Street. The centre has completed its major redevelopment, including the expansion over Yarra Street via a flyover.

== History ==
=== The site ===
The site of Westfield Geelong has seen many uses before the construction of the shopping centre. Corio Street once ran east west through the site, as well as the north-south Blakiston Street (that ran between Malop and Corio Streets) and Macks Lane (that ran from Corio Street to Brougham Street).

The southern frontage to Malop Street was a retail area from at least the 1850s. Among the longest lasting stores was that owned by Morris Jacobs, which remained until the 1950s when it was purchased by Myer Emporium. The store was rebuilt in 1952, and in August 1953 changed its name to Myer. The Myer store was incorporated into the new development.

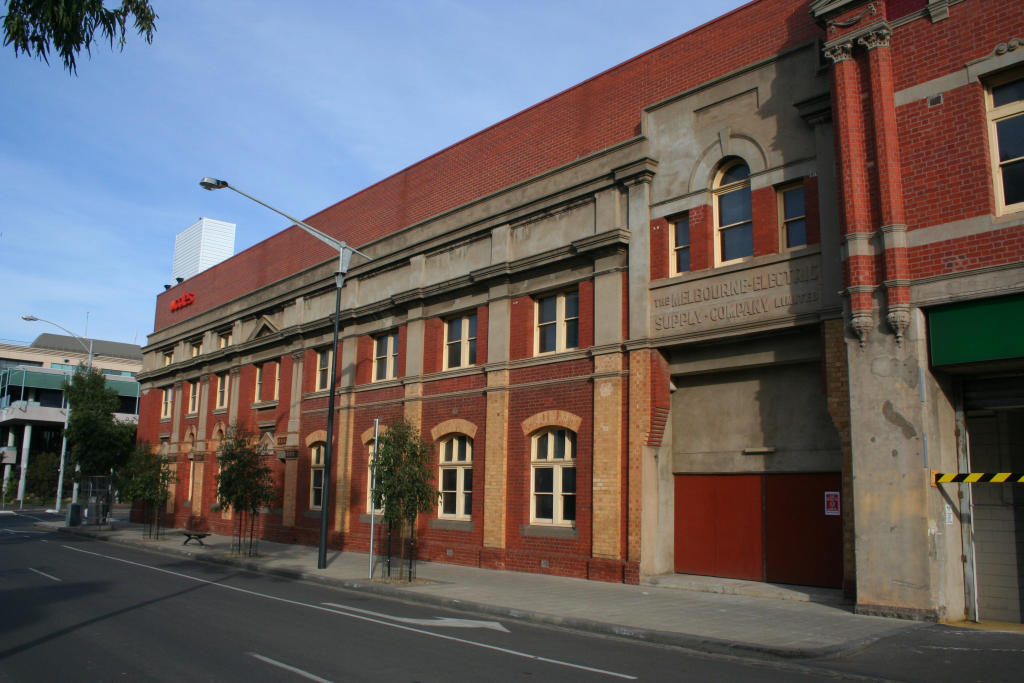
Façade of the Melbourne Electric Supply Company Building.

The corner of Brougham and Yarra Streets was occupied by the Melbourne Electric Supply Company office building, and the Geelong Power Station, which dated back to 1901. A tram depot was built to the south when trams commenced operation in Geelong in 1912. The tram depot closed in 1956 along with the Geelong tram network. The power station closed in the 1960s when replaced by a new plant at North Geelong.

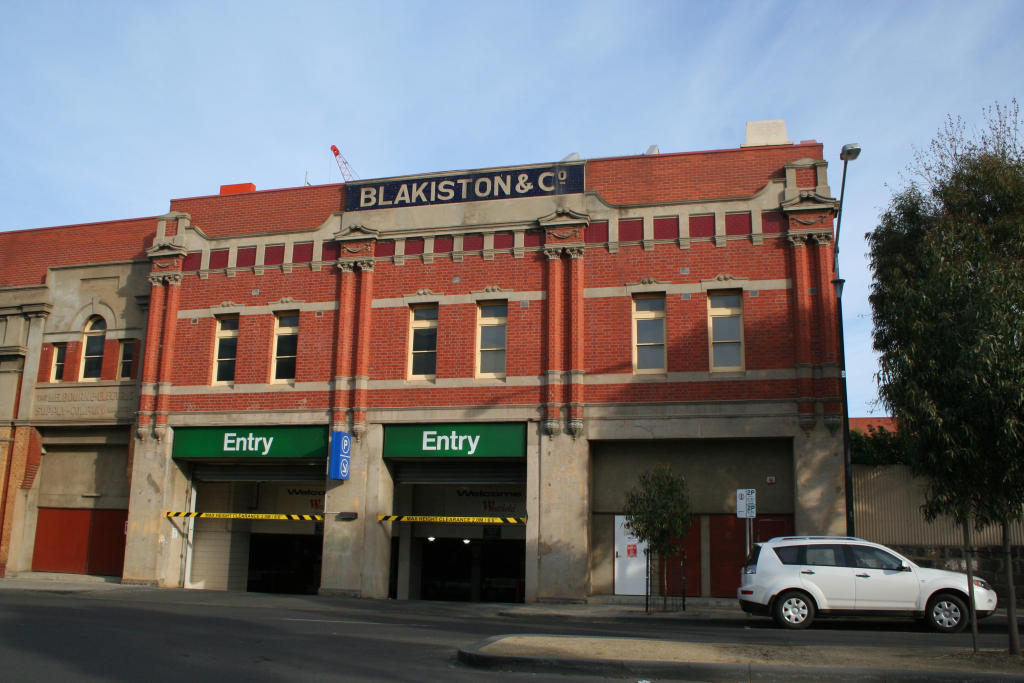
Blakistons Building and car park entry.

The next building to the west was occupied by the offices of Geelong transport company, Blakiston's and Co. Adjacent was The Geelong Club clubrooms which were opened in 1889 and continues to be occupied by the Geelong Club today.

The corner of Brougham and Moorabool Streets was occupied by the Strachan Murray and Shannon wool store. The woolstore dated back to the 1940s, and was extended eastwards towards the Geelong Club building in 1952 when the adjacent Mack's Hotel was purchased and demolished.

=== Initial proposals ===
The 1980s saw the first of many urban renewal proposals floated for the area. The Geelong Regional Commission on 6 November 1981 released a plan that would see a massive shopping centre extend from Little Malop Street through to the waterfront. This proposal did not proceed, but a scaled down version of the plans can be seen in the Market Square Shopping Centre and Bay City Plaza developments that did proceed.

=== As 'Bay City Plaza' ===
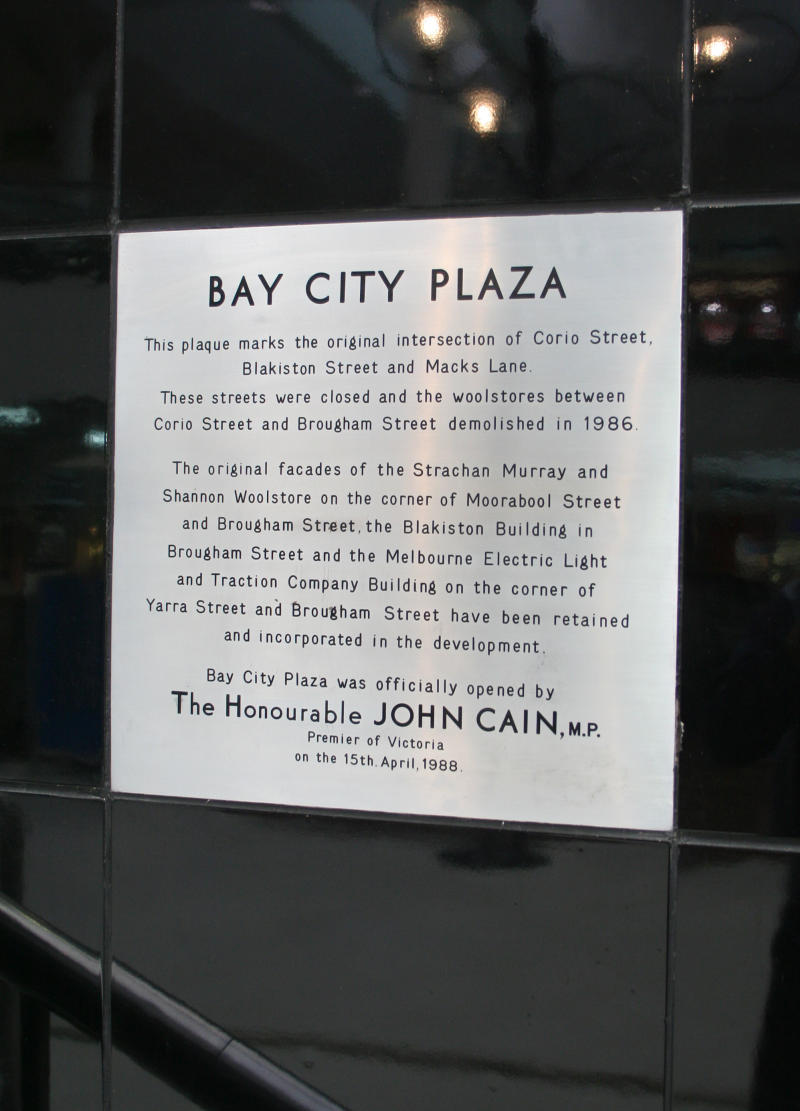
Plaque marking opening of Bay City Plaza.

Construction of Bay City Plaza commenced in the mid 1980s. Corio and Blakiston Streets were closed, as was Macks Lane. The former power station was totally demolished, with the Strachan woolstores, Blakistons's offices and tram depot stripped internally, with only the facades reused. The Myer store remained, albeit with minor modifications and an altered facades along Malop Street.

The centre was opened by then Victorian State Premier John Cain on 15 April 1988. The centre was under the ownership of the Perron Group. Little change occurred to the centre itself until 1993 when a minor refurbishment occurred.

An additional multi-storey carpark was built by the Perron Group in the late 1990s. Known as the "Malop Street Carpark", it was located between Malop Street and Corio Street to the east of the existing shopping centre, on the site of a former council carpark. The site is now part of the current expansion works to the centre.

On 30 June 2003 the Perron Group sold a 50% share of Bay City Plaza to the Westfield Group for $72 million. The renaming of the centre soon followed. After Westfield's acquisition of the centre, the new management increased the percentage of lettable area inside the complex, with new walkways constructed and the main atrium filled with additional stores and kiosks.

=== Redevelopment ===
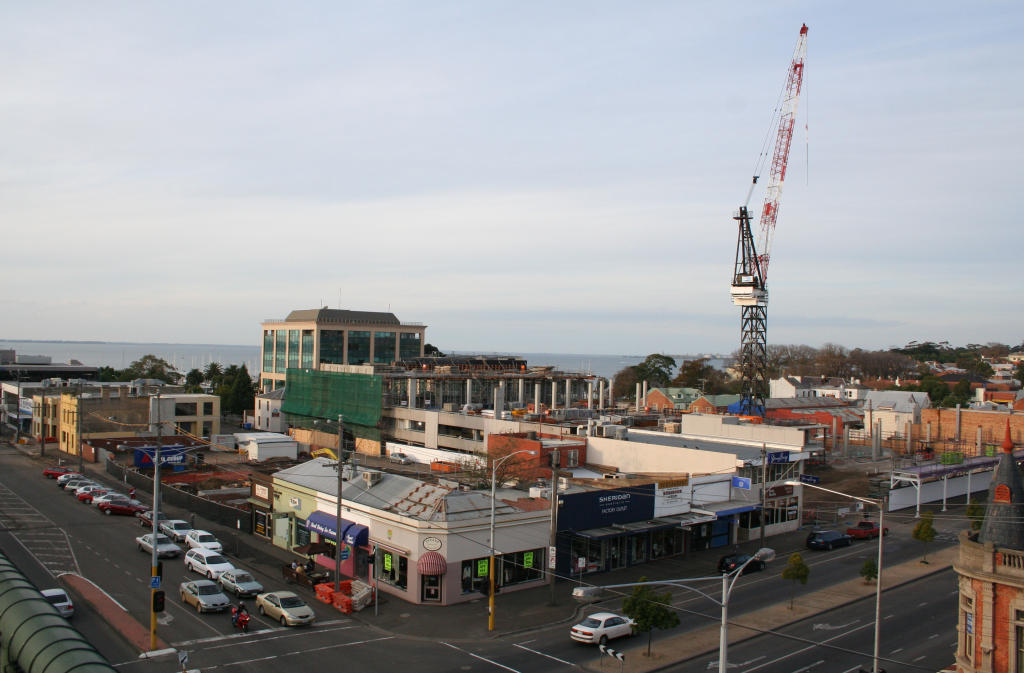
Construction at Westfield Bay City, looking north-east from Market Square.

The early 2000s saw proposals floated for the expansion of the shopping centre, utilising a flyover over Yarra Street, but this was met with a negative response from the community. The flyover was criticised for blocking views of Corio Bay from Yarra Street, and that the bridge was not just a walkway but an overhead carpark, shopping strip and roadway on a similar scale to the multi-level retail/pedestrian bridge at Westfield Southland.

The development was given approval on 21 June 2006 and construction commenced in February 2007 and resulted in major closures to various parts of the centre, with Big W to be the key tenant of the Yarra Street section. A number of smaller shops on both the ground and first floors were temporary closed, along with the Coles supermarket and the eastern pedestrian entry from Yarra Street. Part of the main multi-level carpark has been closed, as well as the Yarra Street access ramp and the Malop Street Carpark. Treacy Place as well as the eastern section of Corio Street have been permanently closed and are now covered by the centre.

During construction in April 2008 a fire broke inside the complex taking two hours to extinguish, and in May 2008 a tradesman was injured when pinned against a beam while operating a cherry picker.

Stage 1 including the Coles supermarket and surrounding area opened on 17 April 2008, while the Big W store, another 80 stores, the restaurant precinct, the glass tower on the Malop Street corner and the Yarra Street flyover were opened on 17 July. Before redevelopment the centre had 67 stores and 1121 car parks, today it has 187 stores and 1700 car parks. The total cost of the works was $200 million.

The works have resulted in an increase in the percentage of lettable area in the complex, with the majority of the main central atrium being filled in. The opening of complex has also led to a decline in strip shopping on Moorabool Street, with many empty shops and few customers. The head of the Central Geelong marketing committee, Mark Davis, expressed concern that despite the expanded shopping centre being a boost for the city, it will make life tougher for smaller traders, who would need to "figure out how their business fitted into the city's new shopping environment".

== Tenants ==
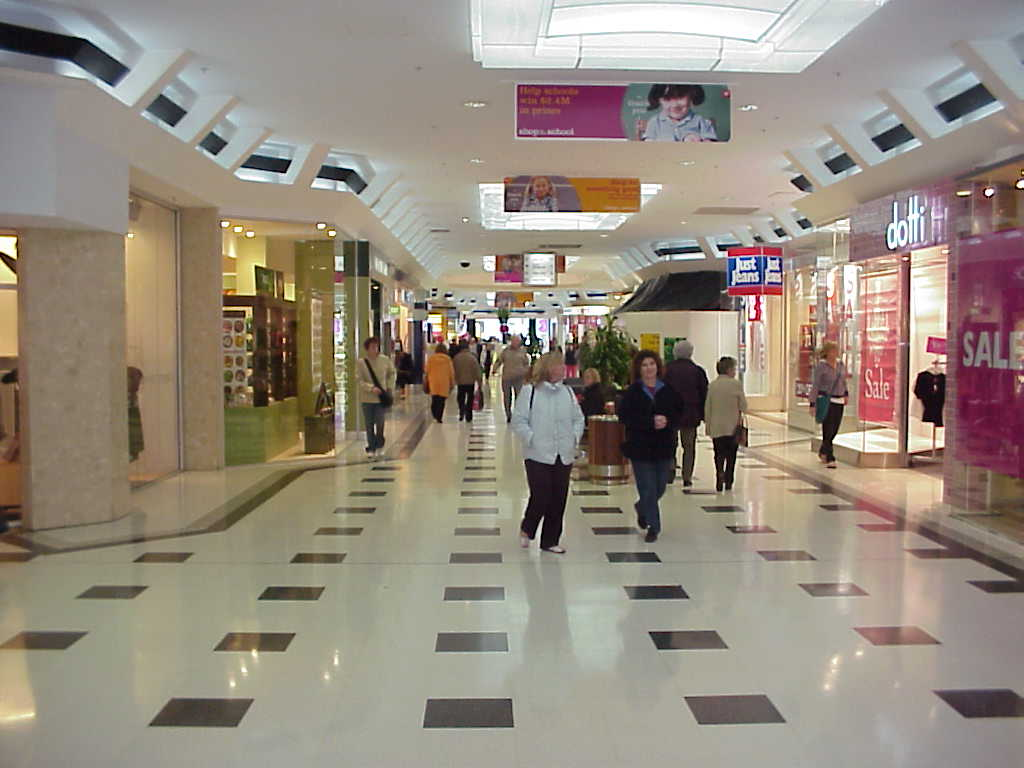
One of the centre's original arcades.

- Myer department store 12,500 m² which was continually redeveloped throughout 2008 as part of a nationwide refurbishment program
- Target discount department store 8,800 m²
- Coles supermarket, was 5,000 m² but a smaller store was reopened 17 April 2008 with 9 aisles
- Big W discount department store.
- 187 specialty stores.
- Three food courts: an alfresco area on Yarra Street, cafes on the flyover, and a third under the main atrium.
