= Public Square Historic District =

Public Square Historic District may refer to:

- Public Square Historic District (Scottsboro, Alabama)
- Public Square Historic District (Sigourney, Iowa)
- Public Square Historic District (Watertown, New York)

== See also ==
- Public Square (disambiguation)
