= Lutsk Orthodox Fellowship of the True Cross =

- Architectural Complex of Lutsk Orthodox Fellowship of the True Cross
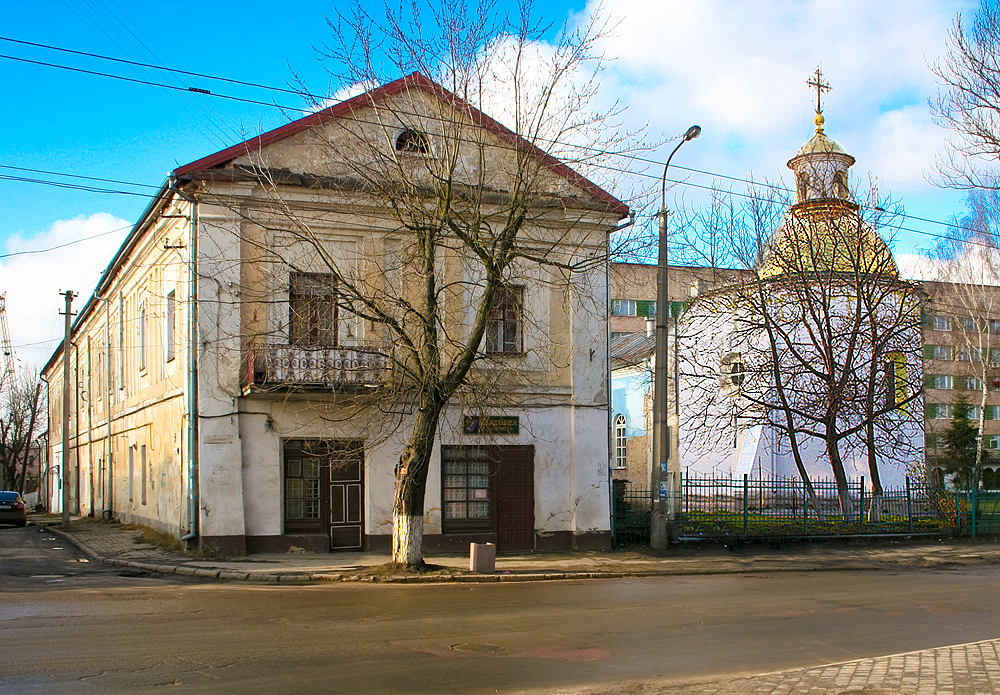
- Lutsk Orthodox Fellowship of the True Cross
- 50°44′26″N 25°19′01″E
- Location: Lutsk
- Country: Ukraine
- Denomination: Ukrainian Orthodox Church of the Kyivan Patriarchate

History
- Consecrated: 1640s

Architecture
- Functional status: active
- Years built: 1630-1640

Immovable Monument of National Significance of Ukraine
- Official name: Здвиженська церква (Exaltation Church)
- Type: Architecture
- Reference no.: 030110

Immovable Monument of National Significance of Ukraine
- Official name: Монастир василіанів (Monastery of the Basilians)
- Type: Architecture
- Reference no.: 030114

The Lutsk Orthodox Fellowship of the True Cross is an architectural and historical complex consisting of a church and a monastery and located on the border of the Market and Bratskyi Mist squares in Lutsk, Ukraine. The buildings were constructed during the 1630s and 1640s, and were the political center of the Orthodox people of Volyn. The Lutsk fellowship began to decline at the turn of the 18th century, and the buildings deteriorated. They were damaged by fire during the 18th century, and the church was almost completely destroyed a century later. While the monastery building remains nearly as it was designed, the church has been rebuilt many times; the apse and reconstructed dome are its only original parts. The monastery is an apartment building; the church is used by the Volyn Fellowship of Saint Andrew, heir to the Lutsk Orthodox Fellowship.

== History ==
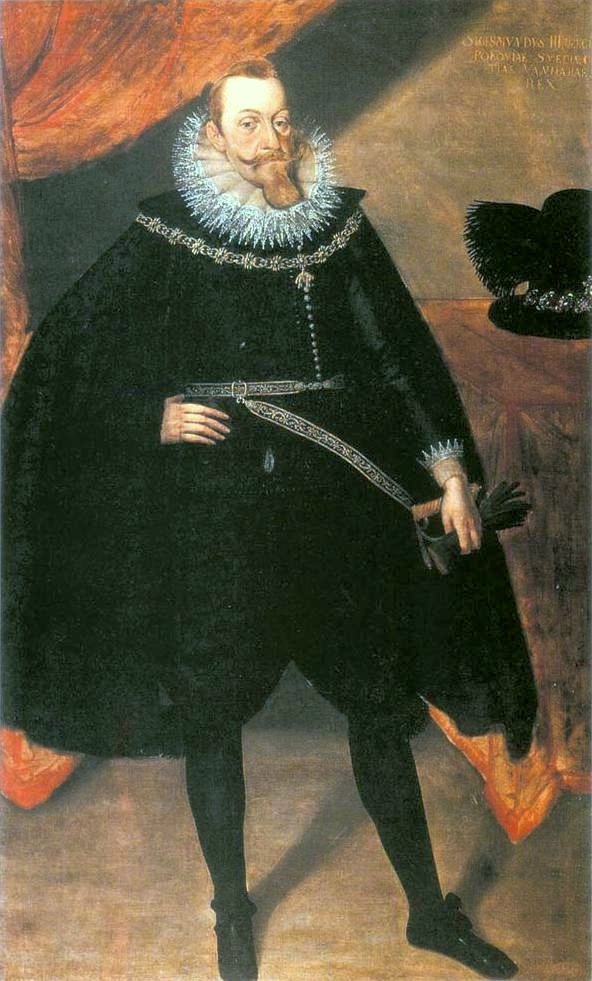
Sigismund III Vasa

In 16th-century Rus', a hospital, the church of Saint Lazar and a cemetery were located on the northern side of Lutsk Island near Glushets bridge; they were destroyed by fire in 1619. On 20 February 1619, Sigismund III Vasa (king of the Polish–Lithuanian Commonwealth) authorized the Fellowship to build a new hospital, church and school on the church site.

The Fellowship owned the former Rus' hospital, and approved plans for new construction by the end of 1619. The following year, a new wooden church and school were built. The Lutsk Orthodox Fellowship had sufficient funds for their activities, and expanded. Since it was impossible to build all the required infrastructure in their own area, the Fellowship purchased neighbouring lands. Some fellowship buildings were located on land belonging to Olexandr Zubcewski, who bequeathed his property to it.

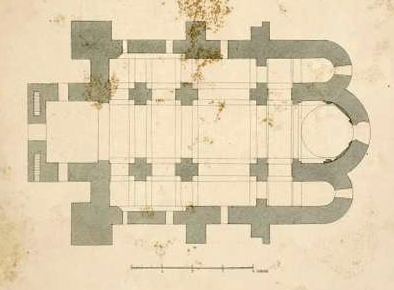
Church plan

A new brick church was built during the 1630s. Its founders were Fellowship members, individual Orthodox donors, clergy and szlachta families (including the Hulewicz, Puzyn, Semashko, and Chetvertynski families of Volyn).

The need for a school, a print shop, a hospital and a monastery created a demand for new construction. In 1645, King Władysław IV Vasa authorized a new brick hospital and administrative house with the aid of Olexandr Mozelli. Mozelli allocated 40,000 zlotys for construction, which began the following year. In 1647, two-story houses (a school, hospital, library, print shop and monastic cells) were completed.

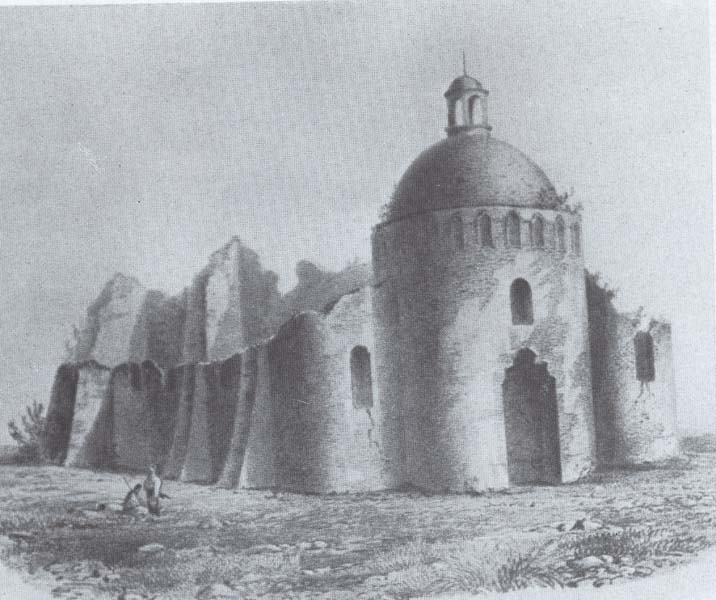
Nineteenth-century ruins

In 1713, the Lutsk Fellowship began to stagnate and the Order of Saint Basil the Great took over the monastery. In 1761 the monastery building was damaged in a fire, and was restored by 1774 when a new church entrance was created through a wall. In 1795, the Orthodox Church again purchased the church. During the 19th century, the church nearly collapsed due to neglect; only the altar remained, and relics were kept in a chapel from 1888 to 1890. Alexander III of Russia visited the church on 27 August 1890, granting 3,000 rubles to the fellowship; O. Tereshchenko also donated 2,000 rubles. The church and its iconostasis were reconstructed, and new bells cast. During the 1950s the church was again reconstructed, and is part of the Ukrainian Orthodox Church of the Kyivan Patriarchate.

== Architecture ==
The architecture of the church embodied two concepts: a trilocular design used in Ukrainian wooden churches, and a three-nave construction used in Byzantine architecture. The iconostasis, consisting of 16 icons, was originally made of carved oak and gold leaf during the 19th century. The icons were divided by six carved gilt columns with complex shapes. The second tier of the iconostasis consisted of two sides of the icons. Sculptures of angels, the inscription "Christ is Risen" and a central icon are set above them. An icon of Jesus Christ was set on top of the iconostasis.

== Gallery ==
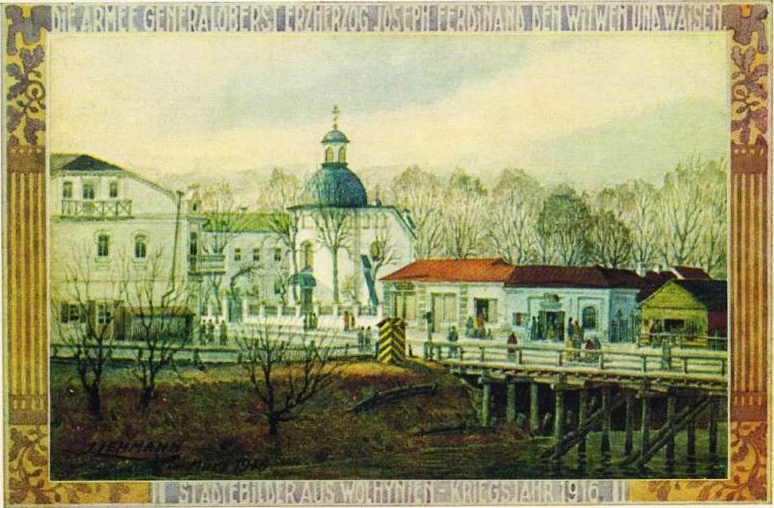
Church in 1916

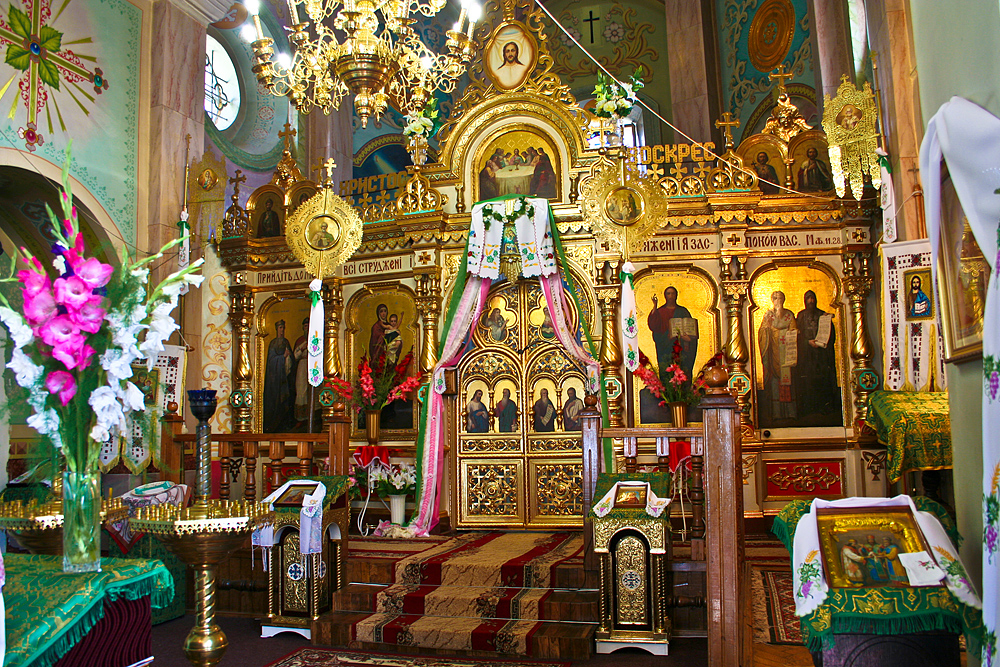
Iconostasis

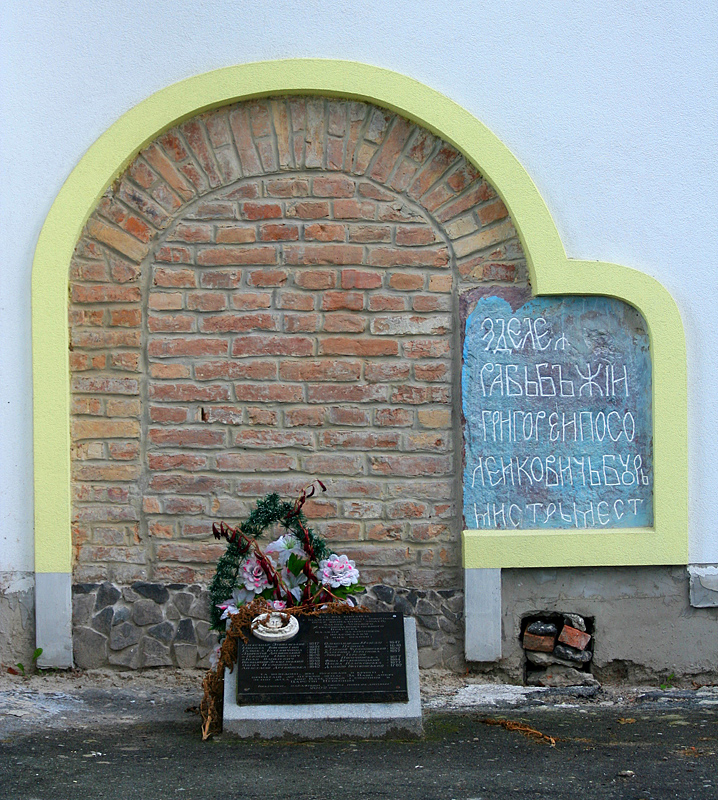
Fragment of the wall

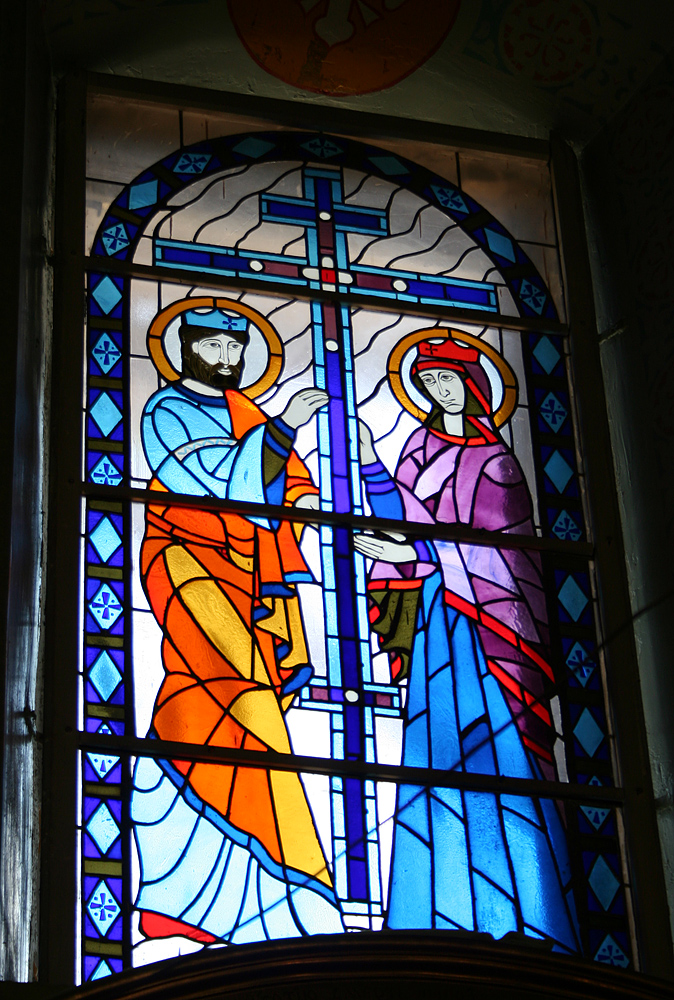
Stained glass

== Sources ==
- Луцьк. Історико-архітектурний нарис. Б.Колосок, Р.Метельницький — Київ, 1990. — с.94-104 ISBN 5-7705-0007-7
- П.Троневич, М.Хілько, Б.Сайчук. Втрачені християнські храми Луцька. — Луцьк, 2001. — с.23 ISBN 966-95830-1-2
- Довбищенко М. В. Волинська шляхта у релігійних рухах кінця XVI — першої половини XVII ст. — К, 2008 — c.184-195, 444—445 ISBN 978-966-2911-22-0
