= Blakistons =

Australian haulage and warehousing company

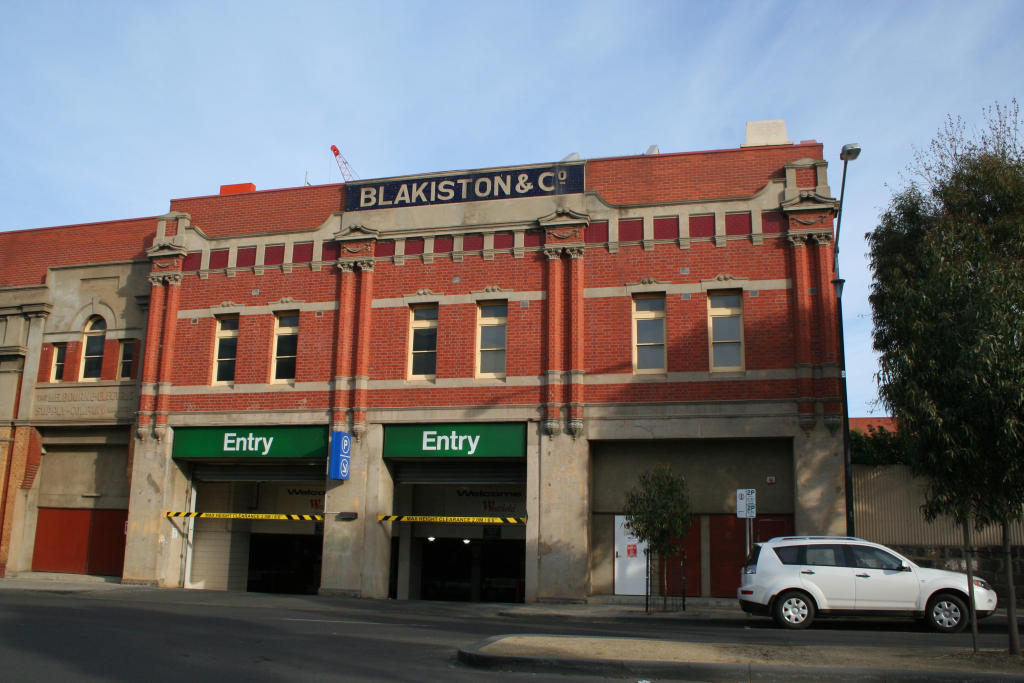
The former Blakistons Building in Brougham Street, Geelong. Now part of Westfield Bay City

Blakistons is a road transport and warehousing company founded in Geelong, Victoria, Australia in 1889.

== History ==
The company supported many worthy causes in Geelong in the 1980s, providing funds towards a theatre at the Geelong Performing Arts Centre, and a new ward at the Grace McKellar aged care home.

In September 1985 the announced that it lost $373,000 in the year to June 25, despite a 35 per cent increase in sales. In March 1987 the company acquired fellow Victorian transport company Robert Boyd Transport (Aust) Pty Ltd Transport, trading as Blakiston Boyd. and posting a $73,000 pre-tax profit in September of the same year.

A 20 percent share of the company was purchased by Jamison Equity Ltd in May 1994, and in October the board recommended that shareholders accept the $5m takeover bid of Scott Corporation Ltd. The company remains in business today as a subsidiary of K&S Corporation.
