= The Public Square =

Poem by Wallace Stevens

"The Public Square" is a poem from the second edition (1931) of Wallace Stevens's first book of poetry, Harmonium. It was first published in 1923, so it is one of the few poems in the collection that is not free of copyright, but it is quoted here in full as justified by fair use for scholarly commentary.

The Public Square

A slash of angular blacks
Like a fractured edifice
That was buttressed by blue slats
In a coma of the moon.

A slash and the edifice fell,
Pylon and pier fell down.
A mountain-blue cloud arose
Like a thing in which they fell,

Fell slowly as when at night
A languid janitor bears
His lantern through colonnades
And the architecture swoons.

It turned cold and silent. Then
The square began to clear.
The bijou of Atlas, the moon,
Was last with its porcelain leer.

The violence of an edifice's demolition is matched by the violence of the poem's language, particularly in the first two stanzas. The slow-motion collapse is captured in the surreal atmosphere created by the third stanza. The final stanza etches a precise image of the square's clearing.

The harshness of the poem can be compared to the brutal encounter with Berserk in "Anecdote of the Prince of Peacocks", with which it shares an architectural motif.

Buttel detects the influence of Cubism.
