= Market Square, Geelong =

Town square in Geelong, Victoria, Australia (defunct)

Coordinates: 38.148°S 144.3615°E

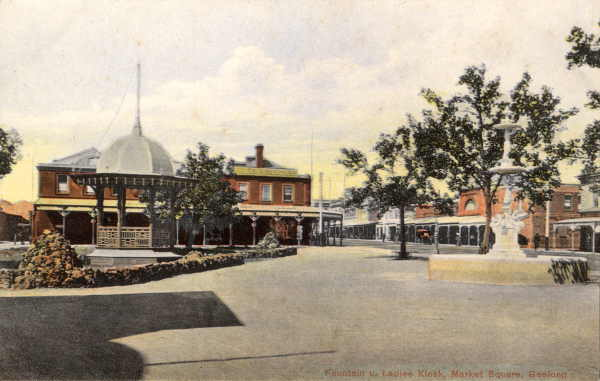
Fountain at Market Square Geelong, looking south towards Bright & Hitchcocks (1906).

Market Square was a town square located in the centre of Geelong, Victoria, Australia. Consisting of eight acres (3.2 hectares) of land, the area was reserved by Governor Sir George Gipps as a town square during the initial surveying of Geelong. The area later became a produce market, before being progressively built upon. Today the Market Square Shopping Centre occupies the site, having been opened in 1985 by the City of Geelong.

== History ==
A water tank to provide domestic water was provided in the square in 1850 by a Mr William Grey.

=== Clock tower ===
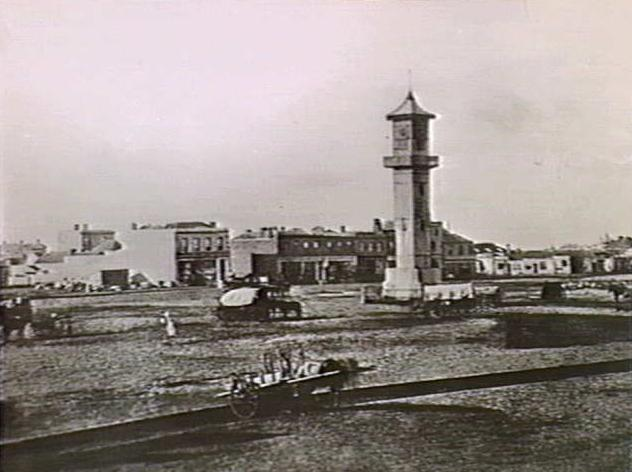
The Austin Clock Tower in 1916, demolished in 1923.

A clock tower was built in the centre of the square in 1856. It was the idea of the second Mayor of Geelong James Austin, who offered to pay for a clock tower in Geelong to mark his term as mayor.

The clock was featured in the Illustrated London News in March 1855. Components for the clock arrived in Geelong on 13 November 1855 from England, but the location for the clock had yet to be decided. Suggestions of high ground at top of Moorabool, Yarra or Gheringhap Streets were put forward at the time, the indecision lasting into early 1856. In July 1857 a decision was made, and the foundation stone was finally laid in the Market Square.

The clock tower was of prefabricated construction, composed of cream and brown tiles held in place by ornamental cast-iron work. The tiles were made by Mintons, and were 14 inches (360 mm) by 11 inches (280 mm) in size. It was 60 feet (18 m) high, 7 feet (2.1 m) wide, and had an internal stairway running to the top, where there was a balustraded platform. The clock required winding once a week. A gilded kangaroo acted as a weather vane at the apex of the tower. It was described by Sir Thomas Maltby in an article printed in the Geelong Advertiser as "a lifelike model of a Kangaroo about four feet high, exclusive of the four cardinal points on which it pivots freely. The tail in a horizontal position, gives direction to the erect body, looking always into the wind." Sir Thomas Maltby purchased this irreplaceable relic thereby saving it from being turned into scrap metal and is still in perfect working order.

George Thomas Lloyd was elected to the District Council of Grant at the first election conducted on 10 May 1844. On 1 May 1845, Cr. Lloyd moved the motion that a block of vacant land be set aside in Geelong for a town square, which was duly passed. In W.R. Brownhill's monumental History of Geelong and Corio Bay, he wrote: "When Lloyd was in England in 1853, he was given the responsibility of getting Geelong's first public clock. By September 1854 the council received from Lloyd a design of the clock and tower", which included his drawing of a Kangaroo for the weather vane.

The clock tower remained until October 1923 when it was demolished to make way for the CML Building. There was a public outcry, and no one was willing to demolish it. However, it was deemed too impractical to move intact, and was brought down by steel cables attached to traction engine. The site of the clock tower is marked by a plaque in the Market Square Shopping Centre.

=== Exhibition building ===
An exhibition building opened in Market Square on 27 December 1881. It was located to the west of the Clock Tower, and had a frontage to what became Jacobs Street. The site today is north-east of Rock O'Cashell Lane. The building had two 12-metre high corner towers, a large balcony, and a semi-circular fanlight to light the main hall. The building held a juvenile and industrial exhibition for four months, that had over 30000 exhibits.

After the closure of the exhibition, the building was converted to house live theatre performances. The building had a 1500-seat capacity, and was known as the Exhibition Theatre. By the late 1890s it was known as Her Majesty's, and after the death of Queen Victoria it was renamed His Majesty's. Dame Nellie Melba appeared at the theatre in February 1915.

By 1936, when the theatre closed, His Majesty's had been surrounded by other buildings constructed on the square. The building was occupied by Cowley's Motor Garage.

=== Town square ===
After the construction of the exhibition building, the land to the west was landscaped as a town square. Trees were planted, and a fountain constructed.

After the death of Queen Victoria in 1901, there was a move by the townspeople of Geelong to erect a memorial statue. A design competition was held, with Mr Clement Nash of Gheringhap Street winning. Melbourne sculptor John Swan Davie modelled the statue in clay, before a plaster cast was made, which was then sent to bronze founder Mr Parlanti of London.

The statue weighed two tonnes, and was unveiled on 24 May 1904. In 1912 it was moved to the entrance of Eastern Park due to the construction of the Solomons Building on the same site.

=== Solomons Building ===
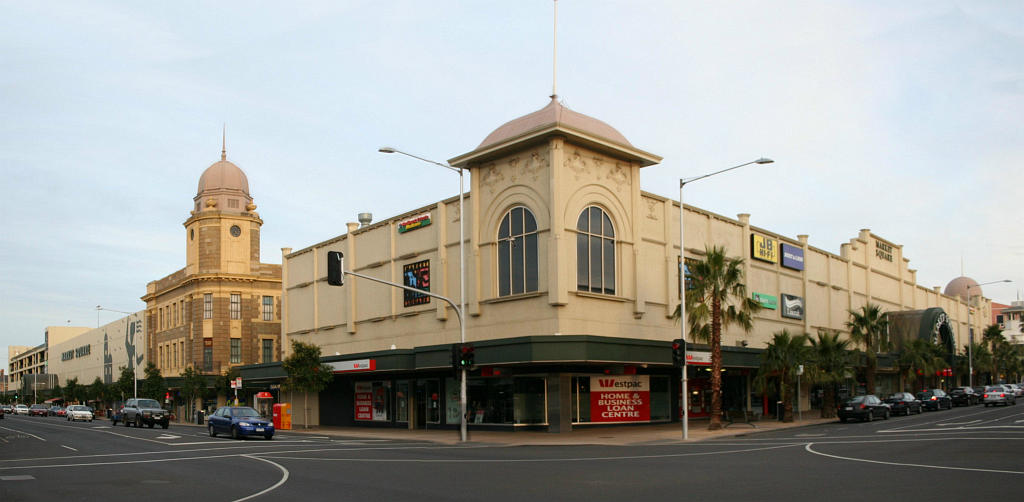
Solomons Building from the Moorabool and Malop Street corner, 2007.

1912 saw the clearing of the western side of the Market Square for the Solomons Building. The building housed a department store owned by Mr Julius Solomon, and was officially opened on 16 April 1913. It was the third largest floor space without walls of stores in Victoria at the time.

Mr Solomon had wanted to build a store in the Market Square for five years. The contract allowed the construction on the crown land, as long as the buildings reverted to council in 50 years. Solomons closed in 1966 and was replaced by a Woolworths supermarket, before the building was incorporated into the Market Square Shopping Centre development in the 1980s.

=== Further development ===
In 1915 a referendum was held in Geelong, asking if more stores should be built in the Market Square. The result was yes, and the Block Building in Little Malop Street was built soon after.

=== CML Building ===
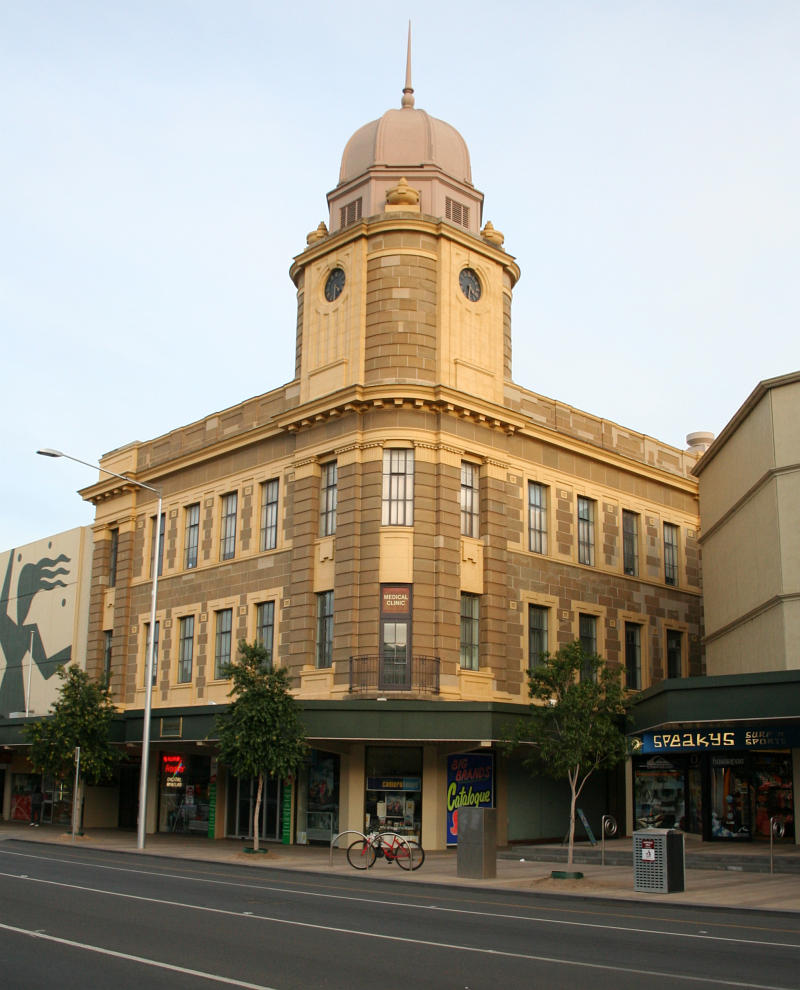
Retained Colonial Mutual building on Malop Street

The Colonial Mutual Life Assurance (CML) Building was announced on 28 May 1923. The building for the insurance company was to occupy the site of the clock tower, which was demolished in October 1923. The new three-storey stone office building was designed with a new clock tower to house the old clock, topped with a copper dome. Once again, due to being built on crown land, the building was to revert to council in 50 years.

=== Car park ===
Growing motor traffic in Geelong by the 1960s resulted in a need for more car parking in the central area. To provide this, Cowley's Motor Garage (located on the former Exhibition Building site) was demolished, and a three-level concrete carpark built. Officially opened on 20 October 1961 by Member for Corio Mr Hubert Opperman. The car park cost £70,000 ($140,000), had a 200-car capacity, and also offered fuel, lubrication, and washing to motorists.

=== Towards redevelopment ===
See Market Square Shopping Centre for the history of the shopping centre itself.

The 1980s saw the first of many urban renewal proposals floated for the central Geelong area. The Geelong Regional Commission on 6 November 1981 released a plan that would see a massive shopping centre extend from Little Malop Street through to the waterfront.

This proposal did not proceed, with the City of Geelong instead deciding to develop their own shopping centre on the Market Square site. Demolition to clear the site of the new shopping centre site commenced in 1984. The CML Building on Malop Street was retained and reused as offices, while the facade of the Corio Stores on Little Malop Street and the Solomons Building on Moorabool Street were reused in the new building. The development also saw the closure of Jacobs Street.

== Gallery ==
Market Square, Geelong (1918)

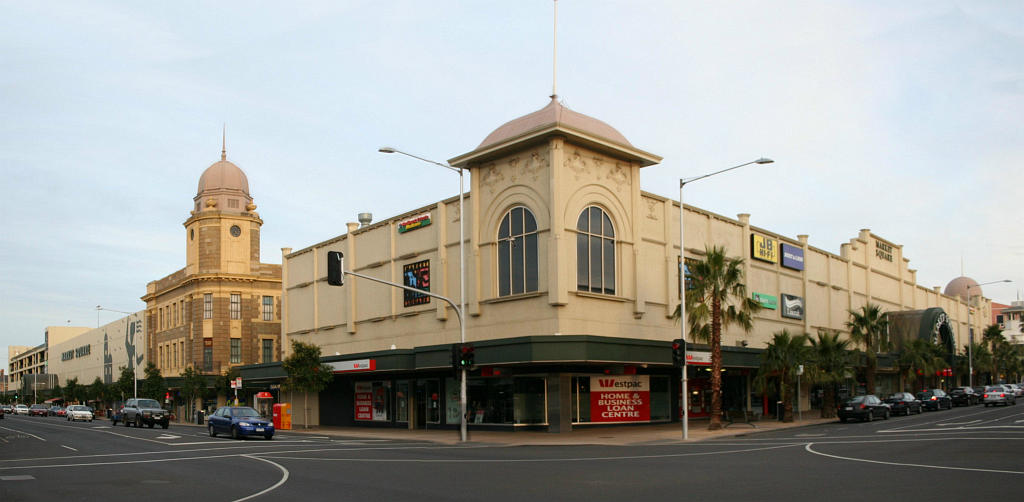
Retained Solomons building on Moorabool Street

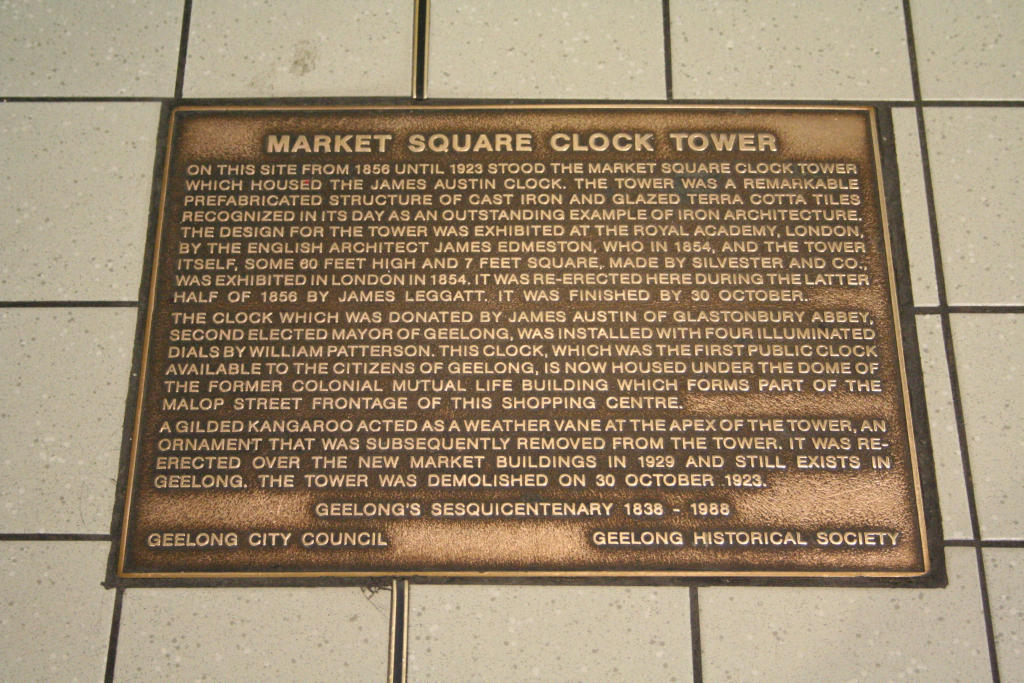
Plaque marking the site of the former clock tower

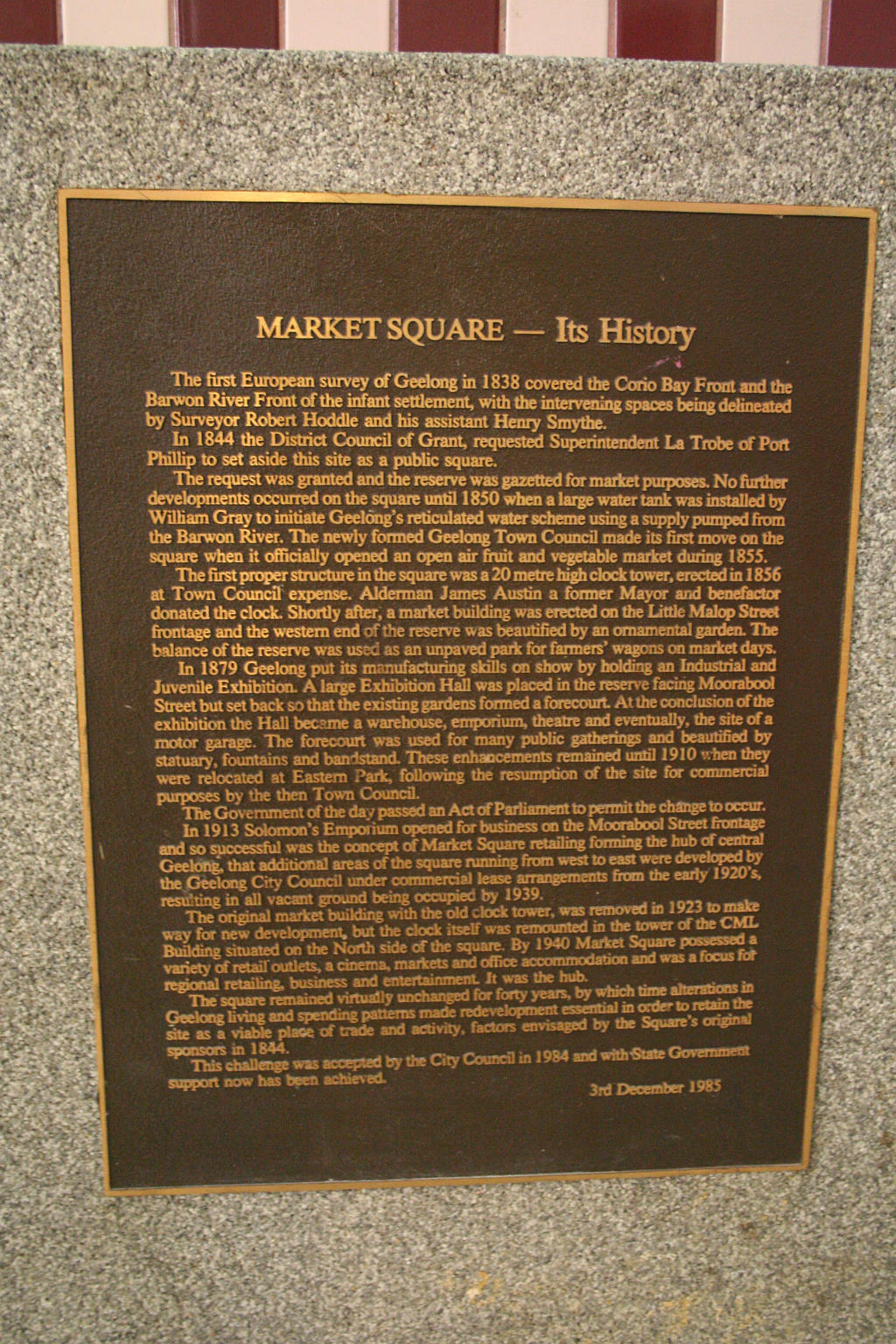
Plaque detail history of Geelong's Market Square
