= Market Square (Lutsk) =

Square in Lutsk, Ukraine

Coordinates: 50°44′23″N 25°19′03″E

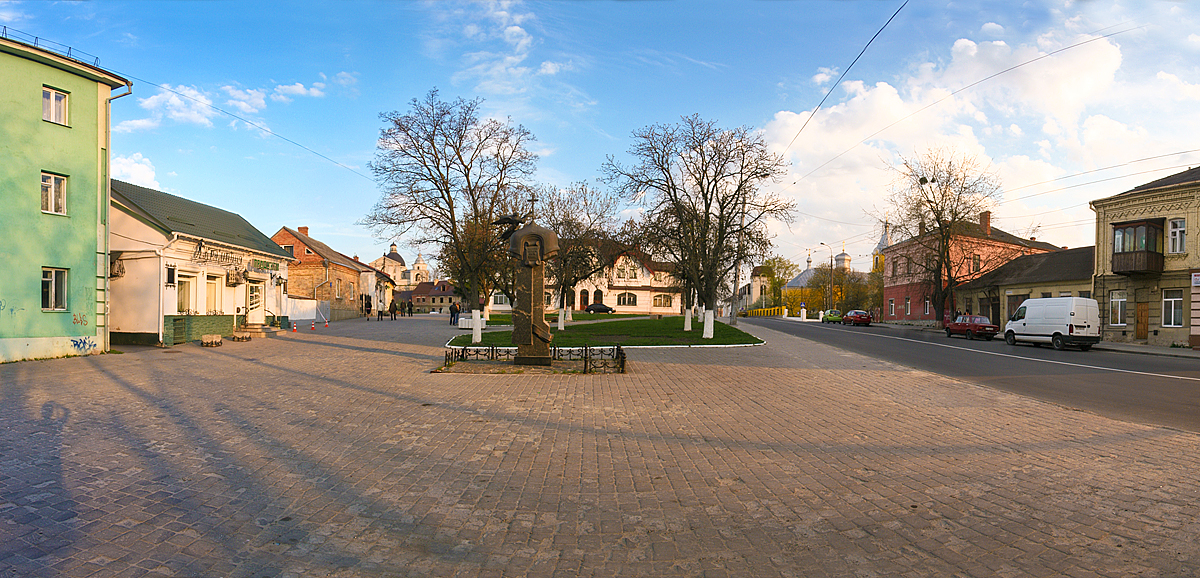
Market Square in 2011

Market Square is one of the oldest squares in Lutsk, Ukraine, dating back to the 14th century. The square was developed after Lutsk received Magdeburg Rights. Over the years, Market Square has been the commercial, social and political center of the city. Previously, the Square was surrounded by administrative buildings and hosted multiple major public events. The market held in Market Square was also the main trade center for the city.

The Square has been destroyed by fire several times during its history. After the Town Hall burned down in the 18th century, new buildings reduced the space for the market, but it still remained the trade center of Lutsk until World War II. Currently, Market Square is a historical landmark surrounded by old townhouses and churches.

== History ==
=== Magdeburg Rights ===
According to geological research, the central hill of the Lutsk suburb was often flooded as it wasn't sited high enough above the Styr River. The area was first populated in the 10th century. Active trade was established due to commercial activity of local and foreign artisans, which encouraged development of trade routes and cultural interaction. The city was divided into typical quarters designed around the main churches. In 1432 Lutsk was granted Magdeburg Rights by King Jogaila.

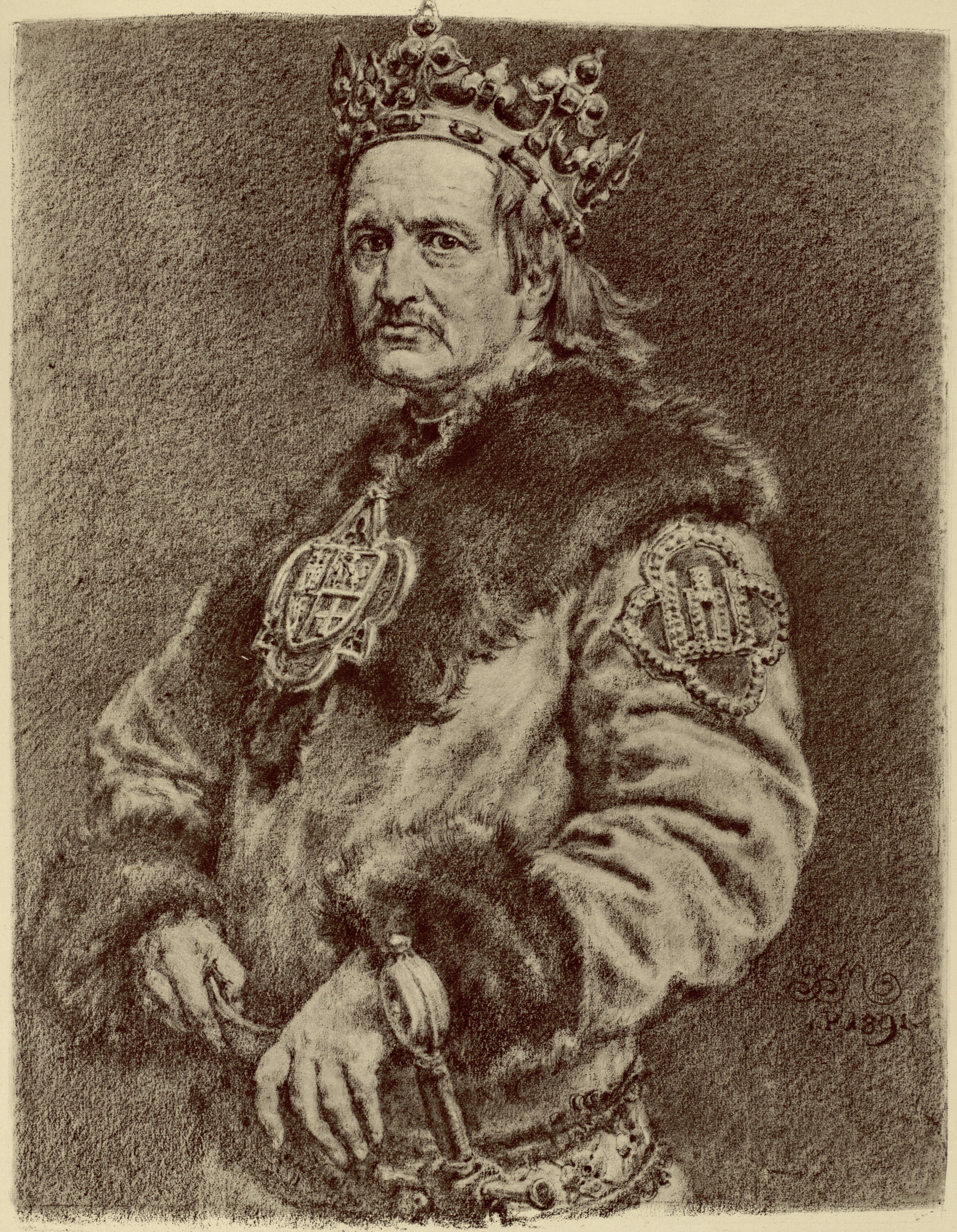
Jogaila

The Magdeburg Law legalized tendencies formed long ago. Social development caused the nascence of a new middle class – the bourgeoisie. They lived in a special quarter in Lutsk. The city was divided into three main areas – the Upper Castle, Roundabout Castle and bourgeoisie territory, which was located west of the castles. The clergy, ministers, princes and magnates lived in the castles. The privileged classes were prohibited from living on the bourgeoisie territory. The Magdeburg Law mostly concerned the Market square and managed bourgeoisie rights and obligations.

According to the Magdeburg Law, an elective government was created – a magistrate consisting of two houses: a higher Court led by a vogt and a lower Council led by a mayor. These Houses were settled in the Town Hall and there were municipal trade measures and scales established. The square was used for trade and social and political events such as royal and magistrate declarations, executions, and other meetings. Lutsk was granted the privilege of holding three annual fairs. Trade in the square assisted many coins corresponded to political and commercial relations between Volyn and other regions. There were many coins from Kiev and Novgorod, soum from the Golden Horde, Prague groschen, Lithuanian and Polish coins and others. In 1385–1388 Lutsk had a mint that produced coins of the Grand Duchy of Lithuania.

=== Economic relations ===
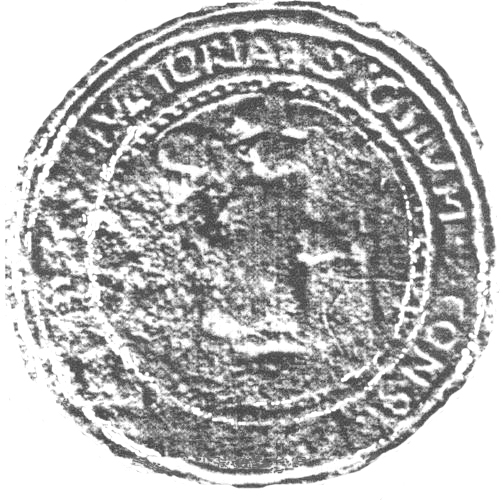
Lutsk emblem 1550–1650

Lutsk maintained economic relations with the Hanseatic League. In 1341, residents of Toruń were granted rights for trading in Lutsk. Artisans brought goods as noted in Toruń customs register of the 14th century. In 1374, Toruń advisor T. fon der Linde sent fabrics to Lutsk Flemish. There are examples of Rhine stone products among archeological artifacts. One of Toruń's merchants, a relative of Nicolaus Copernicus by the mother of the family Watzenrode, died in Lutsk in 1386.

In addition to cities of the Hanseatic League, Lutsk traded with other European cities and countries. Wool and silk fabrics, wine, sugar, gold and luxuries, fish, and pharmacy products were imported from French regions; wine, copper, and knives from Hungary; cloth from Czechoslovakia. While Lutsk exported honey, wax, fish, bread, cattle, leather, resin, tar, etc. Lutsk was the main bread trade center in Volyn for a few centuries. The closest cities to Lutsk – Lublin, Lviv, Kraków, Volodymyr, Kamianets etc. – were also commercial partners.

The Market square was shaped as a rectangle with a church situated at each angle: three Orthodox churches and one Catholic, (Saint Peter and Paul Cathedral). Later, an Armenian church was settled near the Market. The Town Hall, gutted by fire in the 18th century, was situated on the south side of square. The market was surrounded by brick buildings with very deep cellars.

== Decline ==
After the Third Partition of Poland in 1795, Volyn was annexed by the Russian Empire. As the Magdeburg Law was repealed, the Market square began to decline. In the 1930s the square was still filled with low market stalls, but they were destroyed during World War II. A Jewish ghetto was established in the square during the German occupation which resulted in the death of 17,000 Jews by 1942. In the 1950s–1960s, a bus station was built in place of the former Town Hall and a fountain with sculpted swans was built in the middle of the square.

In recent years Market square has become quiet. It is now just an empty triangular square with no trade activity or meetings. The square is surrounded by quaint old brick buildings. Within the square stands a sculpture dedicated to the 2000th anniversary of the Nativity of Jesus. The sculpture is set in the middle of Market square while the Lutsk Orthodox Fellowship buildings are located north of the square itself.

== Gallery ==
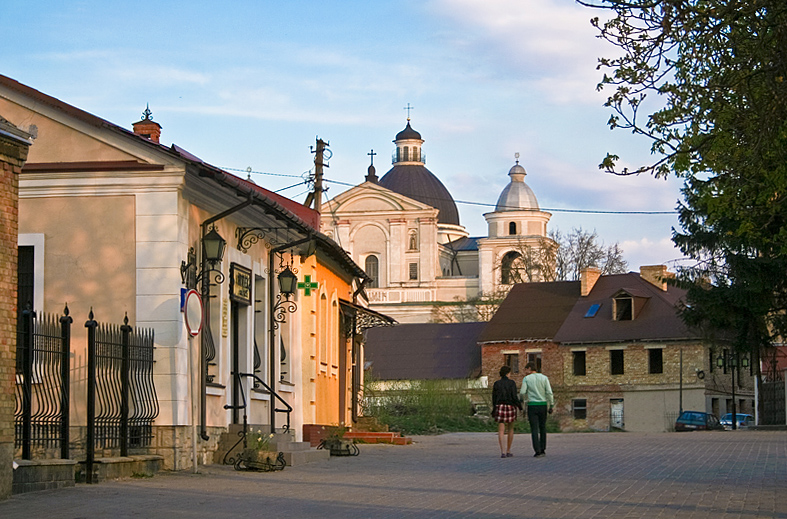
Saint Peter and Paul Cathedral

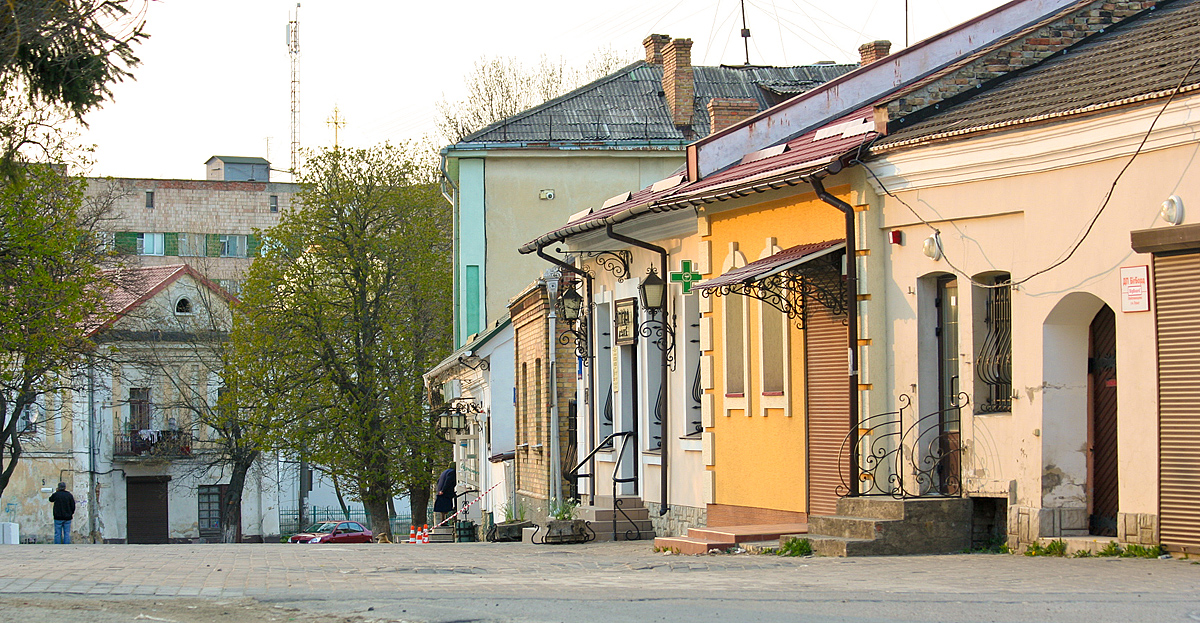
Street

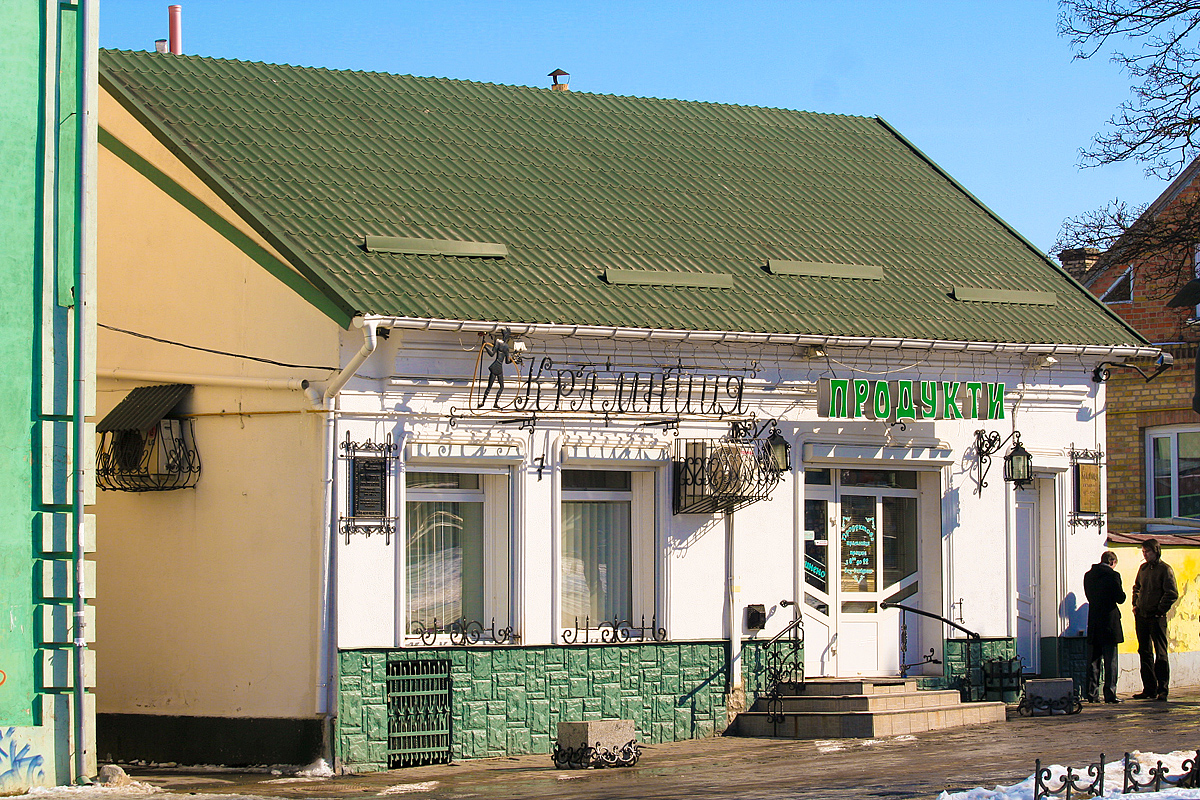
Old building

== Sources ==
- Терський С. Історія Луцька. Том 1. Лучеськ Х—XV ст. — Львів, 2006. — c. 65-83, 162—171 ISBN 978-966-553-660-4
- В.Пясецький, Ф.Мандзюк. Вулиці і майдани Луцька. — Луцьк, 2005. — с.31-32 ISBN 966-361-050-6
- Norman Davies. God's Playground. A History of Poland. Vol. 1: The Origins to 1795, Vol. 2: 1795 to the Present. Oxford: Oxford University Press. ISBN 0-19-925339-0 / ISBN 0-19-925340-4
