= The Square =

The Square may refer to:

== Places ==
=== Europe ===
- The Square, Bournemouth, a public square
- The Square, Tallaght, a shopping centre in Dublin
- The Square, Harlow, a now closed small music venue in England
- The Square, Portsoy, in Portsoy, Scotland
- The Square (restaurant) (1991–2020), a London restaurant

=== North America ===
- The Square, West Palm Beach, a mixed-use development in West Palm Beach, Florida
- Harvard Square, Cambridge, Massachusetts, known as The Square
- Fayetteville Historic Square in Fayettesville, Arkansas

=== Oceania ===
- Cathedral Square, Christchurch, known as the Square
- The Square, Palmerston North, in central Palmerston North, New Zealand

== Films ==
- The Square (1957 film), a British short film directed by Michael Winner
- The Square (1994 film), a Chinese documentary
- The Square, a 2007 Belarusian documentary, released on DVD as Kalinovski Square
- The Square (2008 film), an Australian film
- The Square (2013 film), an Egyptian/American documentary film
- The Square (2017 film), a Swedish film that won the Palme d'Or at Cannes

== Other uses ==
- T-Square (band), formerly known as The Square
- The Square (group), an English grime crew formed in 2012

== See also ==
- Square
- Town square
- Square (disambiguation)
- Town square (disambiguation)
- Public Square (disambiguation)
- Market Square (disambiguation)
- T-square (disambiguation)
