= Square (disambiguation) =

A square is a regular quadrilateral with four equal sides and four right angles.

Square or Squares may also refer to:

== Mathematics and science ==
- Square (algebra), multiplying a number or expression by itself
- Square (cipher), a cryptographic block cipher
- Global square, a principle in infinitary combinatorics
- Square number, an integer that is the square of another integer
- Square of a graph
- Square wave (waveform), a non-sinusoidal periodic waveform

== Construction ==
- Square (area), an Imperial unit of floor area and other construction materials
- Square, a public meeting place:
  - Garden square, an open space with buildings surrounding a garden
  - Market square, an open area where market stalls are traditionally set out for trading
  - Town square, an open area commonly found in the heart of a traditional town used for community gatherings
- Square (tool), an L- or T-shaped tool:
  - Combination square, a tool with a ruled blade and one or more interchangeable heads
  - Machinist square, a metalworking tool used to produce right angles
  - Steel square, also called a "framing" or "carpenter's" square, produces right angles
  - Try square, a woodworking tool for checking right angles
  - T-square, a drafting tool for handdrawing blueprints
- Quadrature (geometry), the process of producing right angles (squaring)

== Arts, entertainment, and media ==
=== Cinema ===
- The Square (2008 film), an Australian neo-noir thriller film
- The Square (2013 film), an Egyptian-American documentary film
- The Square (2017 film), a satirical black comedy film

=== Music ===
- Square (album), an album by Buck 65
- Square (band), a musical trio from Lincoln, Nebraska
- "Square", a song by Mitski from Retired from Sad, New Career in Business
- "Squares", a song by That Handsome Devil from A City Dressed in Dynamite

== Brands and enterprises ==
- Block, Inc., an American financial services and digital payments company, formerly known as Square Inc.
  - Square (financial services), the payment system operated by Block, Inc.
- Square (video game company), Japanese former video game company
- Squares (crisps), British brand of crisps
- Square Group, a Bangladeshi conglomerate company

== Sports ==
- Square, the area in the middle of a cricket outfield on which the primary playing surfaces, known as pitches or wickets, are positioned
- Square leg, a fielding position in cricket

== Square characters and boxes ==
- ■, □, ▪, ▫ (Geometric Shapes)
- ㅁ, ᆷ, ᄆ (Hangul letter "m")
- ロ (Ro (katakana))
- 口 (Kangxi radical 30, "mouth")
- 囗 (Kangxi radical 31, "enclosure")
- $\Box$, the symbol of the D'Alembert operator

== Other uses ==
- Square (astrological aspect)
- Square (dessert), a cake-like bar
- Square (sailing), to adjust yardarms 90 degrees angle to the keel
- Square (slang), a term for one who is conventional, amongst other meanings
- Infantry square, a military tactic
- SQuaRE (Systems and software Quality Requirements and Evaluation), a series of ISO standards numbered starting at 25000; see List of ISO standards 24000–25999#ISO 25000 – ISO 25999

== See also ==
- Market Square (disambiguation)
- Old Square (disambiguation)
- Public Square (disambiguation)
- The Square (disambiguation)
- Town square (disambiguation)
