= Spring City Square =

Public square in Jinan, Shandong, China

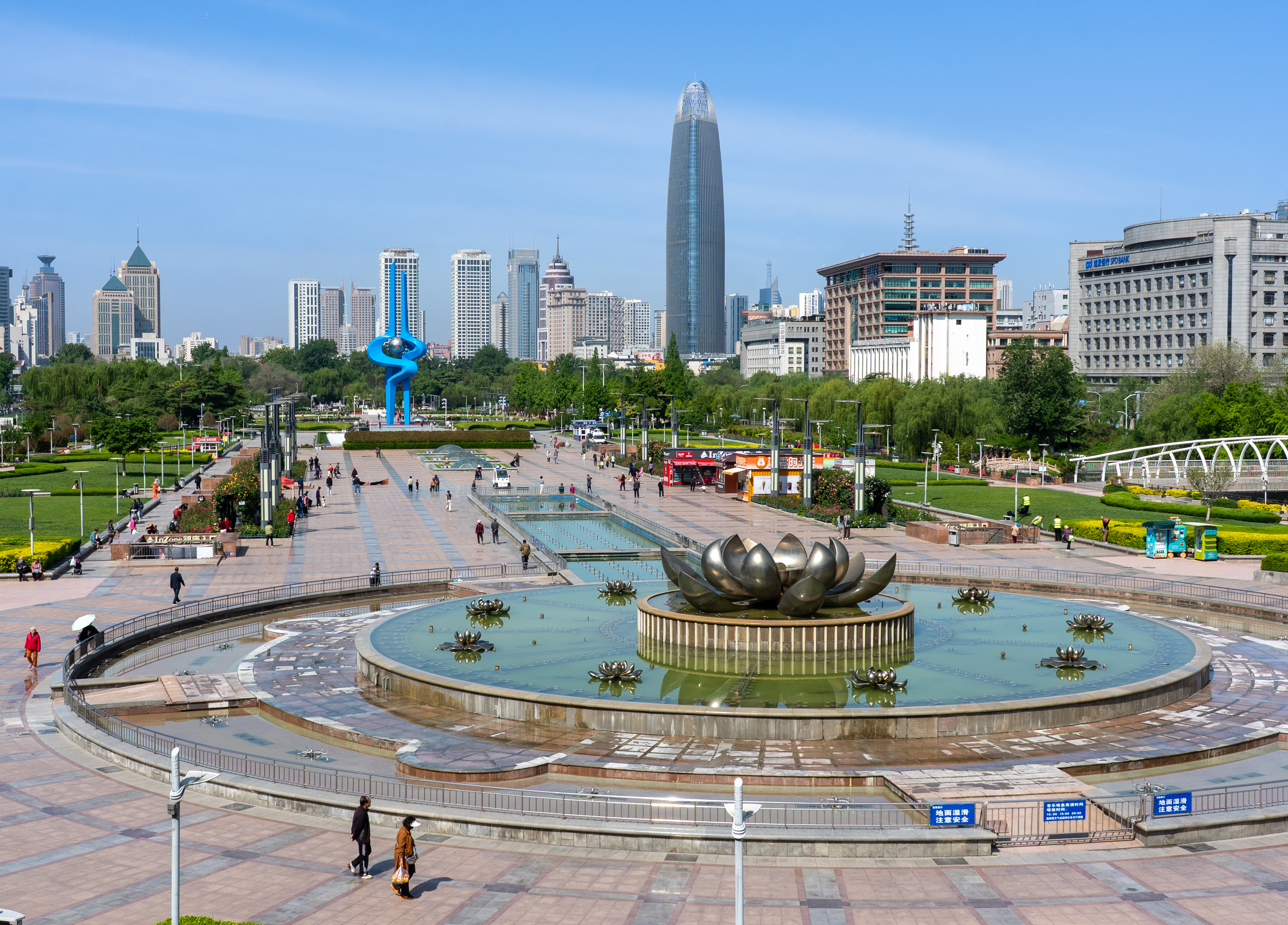
Quancheng Square

The Quancheng (City of Springs) Square (泉城广场, Wade-Giles: ch'üanch'eng; pinyin: quánchéng) is a square in central Jinan, the capital of China's Shandong Province which is known as the "City of Springs". The square has length of 790 metres (2,590 ft) and width of 280 metres (920 ft) which occupies about 220,000 square meters. The construction started on July 10, 1998, and finished on September 25, 1999. The square consists of Baotu Spring Square, Shandong Celebrities Memorial Hall, City of Springs Square, Binhe Square, Sofitel Silver Plaza, Lotus Musical Fountain, Four-Season Garden, Culture Gallery, Technology Center, etc.

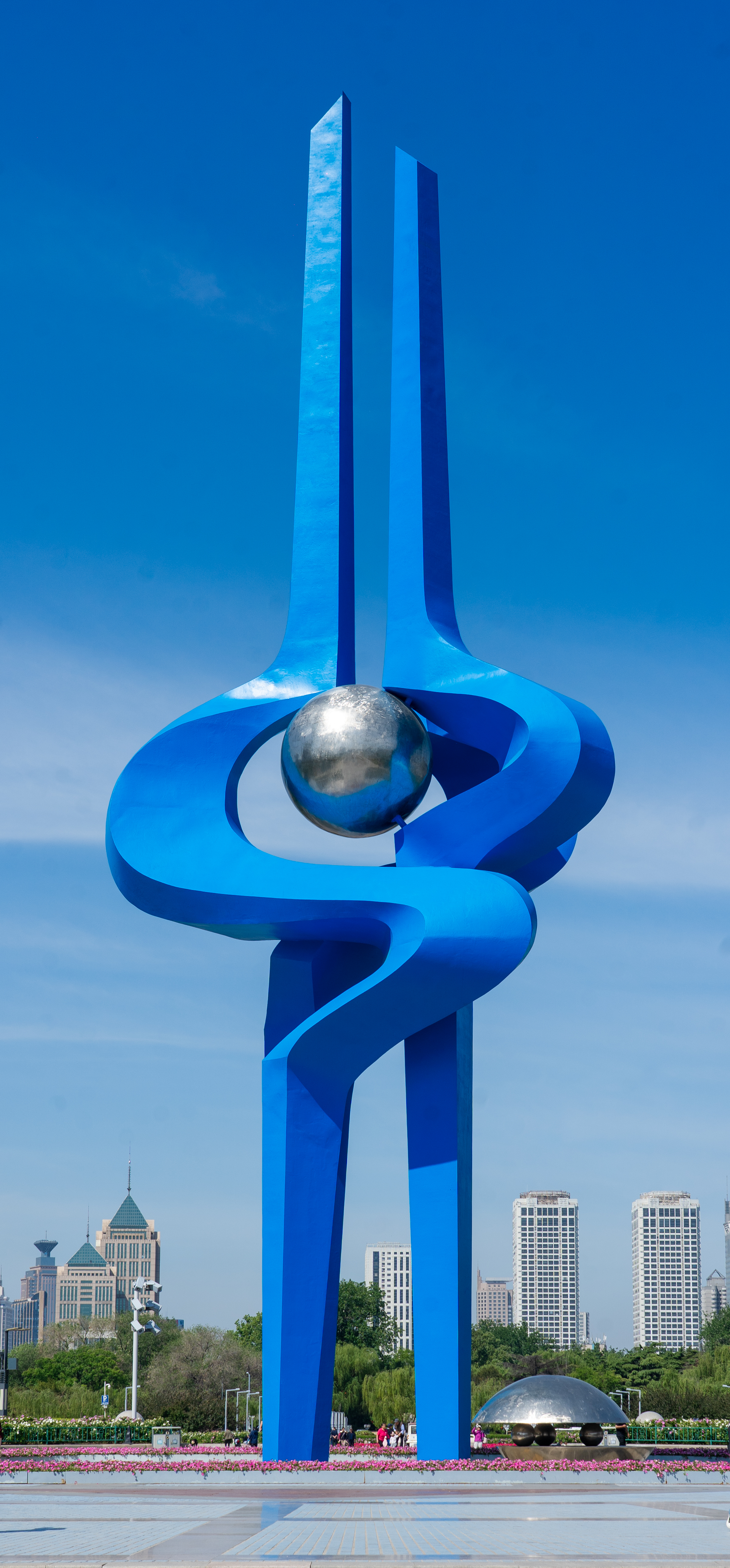
Spring Sculpture in the center of Quancheng Square

The famous statue, Spring, with 38.11 meter height and 170 ton weight at the center of square is designed by Tianren Wang from Xi'an Academy of Fine Arts. The inspiration of this statue comes from the "Spring" (泉) character in Seal Script (篆), which is an ancient style of Chinese calligraphy. It now has become a symbol of Jinan.
