= Market Square Shopping Centre (Geelong) =

Shopping centre in Victoria, Australia

Coordinates: 38.148°S 144.3615°E

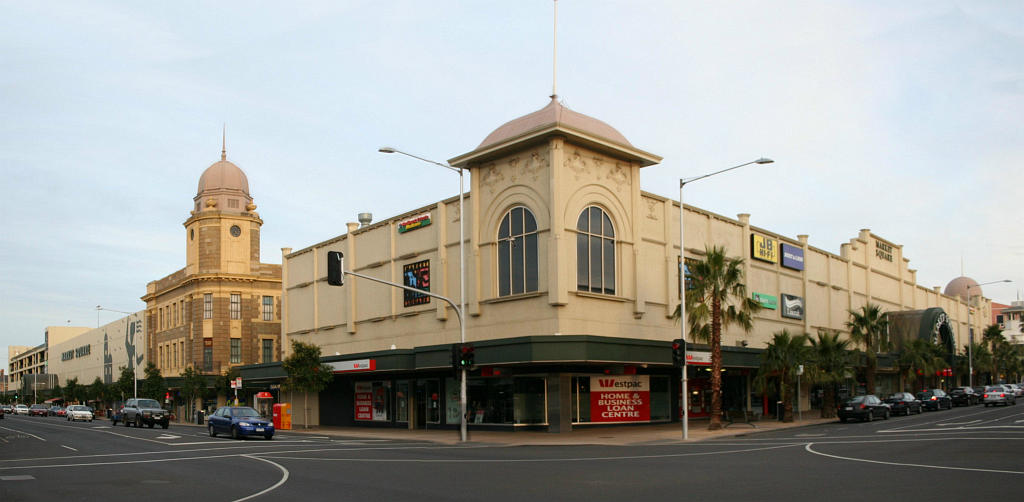
Market Square Shopping Centre from the Moorabool and Malop Street corner

Market Square Shopping Centre is located in Geelong, Victoria, Australia. The shopping centre was named after the original town square of Geelong on which the shopping centre is constructed. The centre is surrounded by Little Malop, Moorabool, Malop, and Yarra Streets. Market Square is located on the southern side of Malop Street opposite the Westfield Geelong shopping complex, the two of which together make up Geelong's Central Shopping Complex.

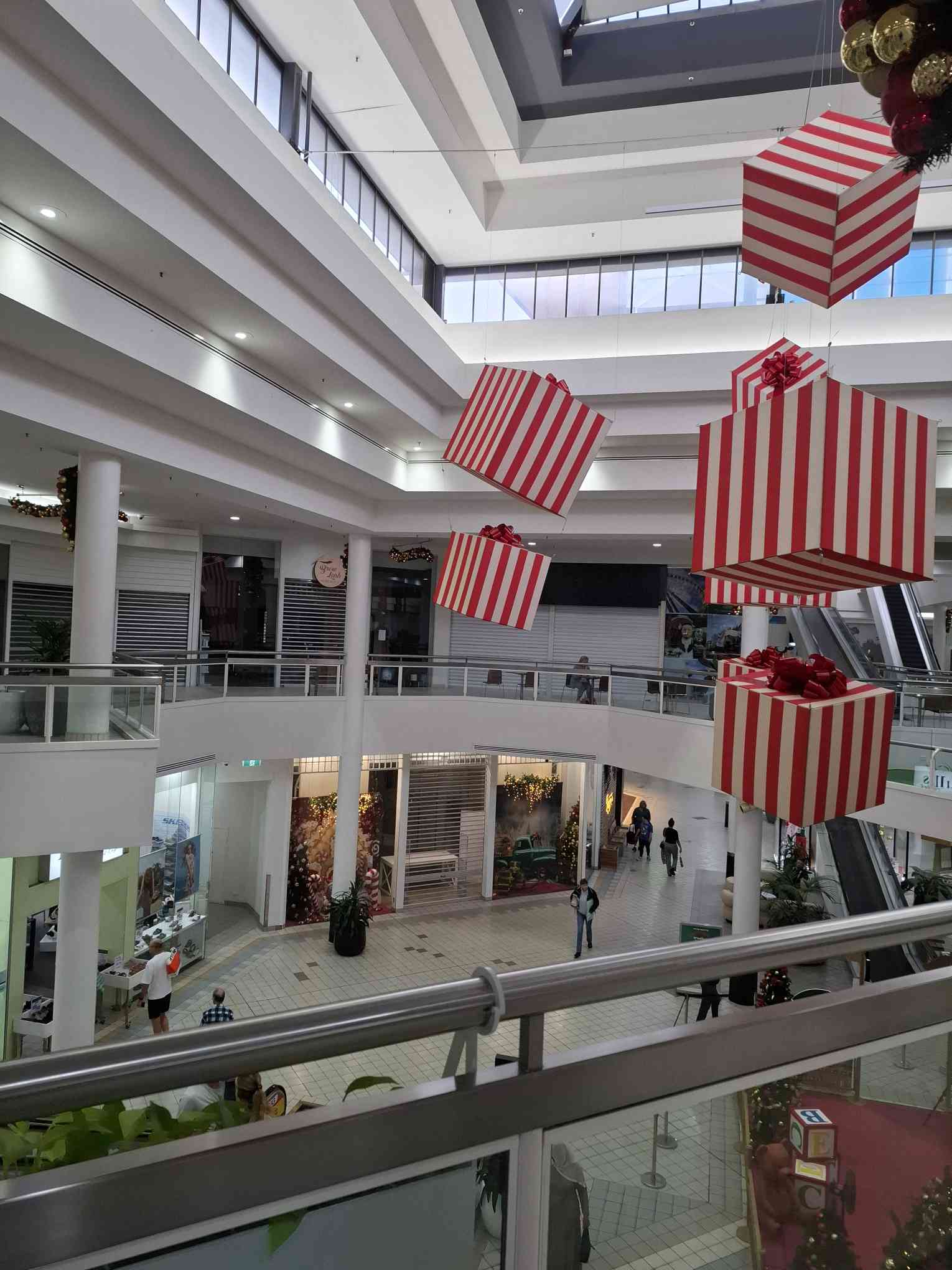
The interior of Market Square Shopping Centre.

== Stores ==
Market Square contains numerous speciality stores such as Best & Less and Harris Scarfe. In 2006, an extension into the former Safeway section of the centre saw other large chains move in, including the return of JB Hi-Fi to Geelong.

== History ==
See Market Square, Geelong for the history of the site before the centre.

The 1980s saw the first of many urban renewal proposals floated for the central Geelong area. The Geelong Regional Commission on 6 November 1981 released a plan that would see a massive shopping centre extend from Little Malop Street through to the waterfront. This proposal did not proceed, but a scaled down version of the plans can be seen in today's centre and the Bay City Plaza development.

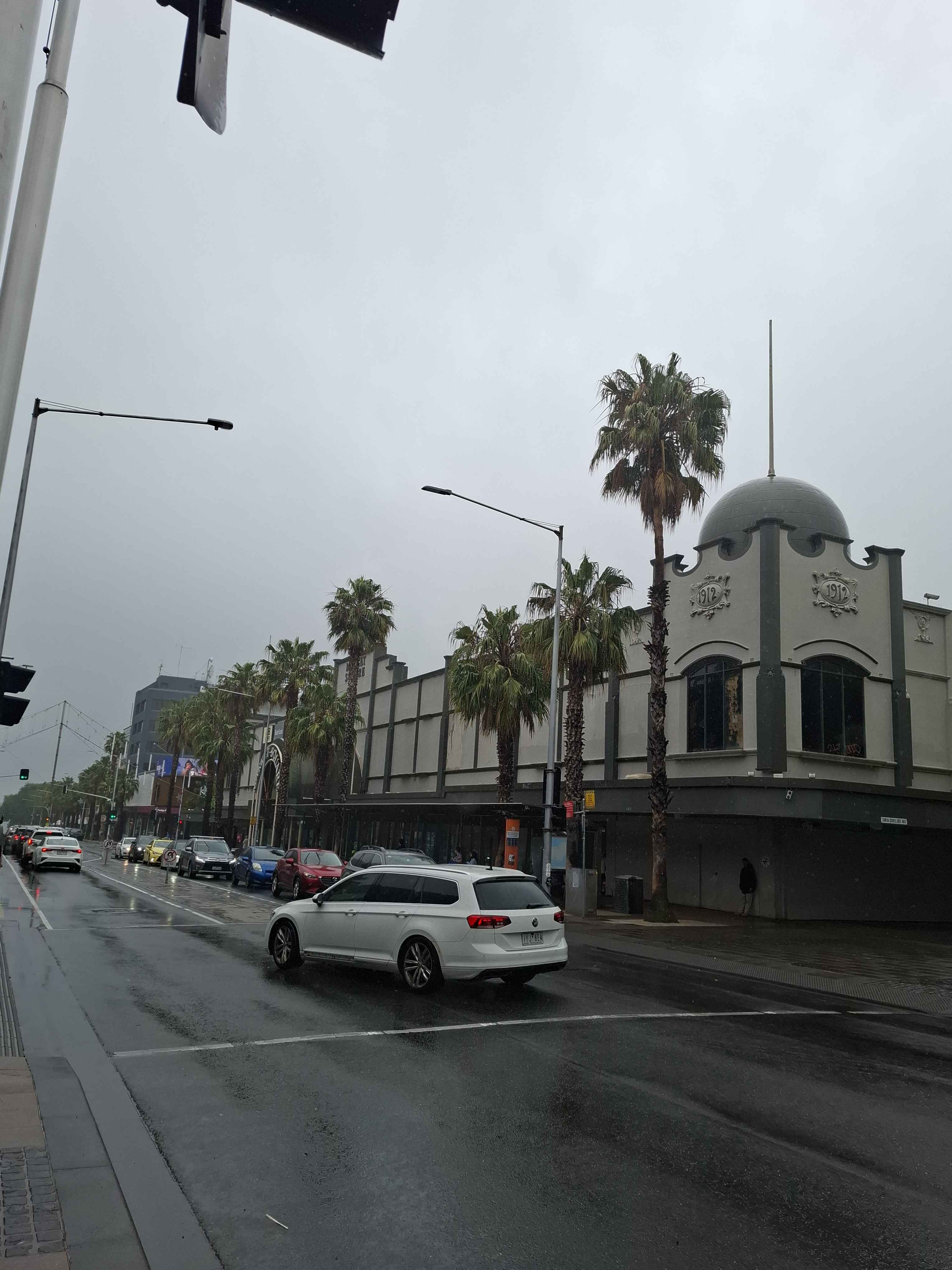
The Moorabool and Little Malop Street corner of Market Square Shopping Centre, 2024

It was decided by the former Geelong City Council that the shopping centre should still be completed, so investors were sought to construct the complex. This was unsuccessful, with the council instead constructing the centre itself. The shopping complex was constructed on Crown land at a cost of approximately $32 million, financed from borrowings. The project also included the creation of the Market Square Mall on Little Malop Street beside the centre, and the beautification of Moorabool Street between Malop and Ryrie Streets.

Demolition to clear the site of the new shopping centre commenced in 1984. The CML Building on Malop Street was retained and reused as offices, while the facade of the Corio Stores on Little Malop Street and the Solomons Building on Moorabool Street were reused in the new building. The development also saw the closure of Jacobs Street that ran from near the Speaky's surf store on Malop Street to the loading dock on Little Malop Street.

The centre was officially opened by Victorian Premier John Cain on 3 December 1985. The management of the centre was the responsibility of the city council.

The initial layout of the centre saw a rather small Safeway supermarket located under the multi-storey car park on the eastern side of the site, with a Venture discount department store located on the first floor at the western end. Speciality stores occupied the majority of the ground floor. The main entrance of the centre was on Moorabool Street, until the opening of the Bay City Plaza shopping centre on Malop Street in 1988.

Images of the centre under construction are on display in the lift lobby on level 1 near centre management. A plaque marks the site of the former Market Square clock tower on the ground floor near the Tattslotto outlet, and a display of historic documents and plaques marking the opening are located around the corner.

== Sale ==
Upon opening the centre drew high rental incomes for the city council. However, these revenues declined by the early 1990s due to competition with Bay City Plaza and the recession after the collapse of the Pyramid Building Society.

In 1993 the newly created City of Greater Geelong decided to sell the shopping centre. The centre was advertised for sale by tender with a closing date of 15 March 1993. No bids were received, but an offer of $27 million was received in the following weeks. None of the bidders were willing to enter into a contract, so the council withdrew the property from sale in June 1993. The Council attempted to establish a linkage with the adjoining Bay City Plaza shopping centre but was unsuccessful.

The decision to put the centre on the market again was made in September 1995.In January 1996 a minimum reserve price of $34.5 million was set. The centre was sold for $32 million when the contract of sale was signed on 12 March 1996, with a settlement date of 28 June 1996.

The centre is currently managed by Knight Frank Australia Pty Ltd.

== Image gallery ==
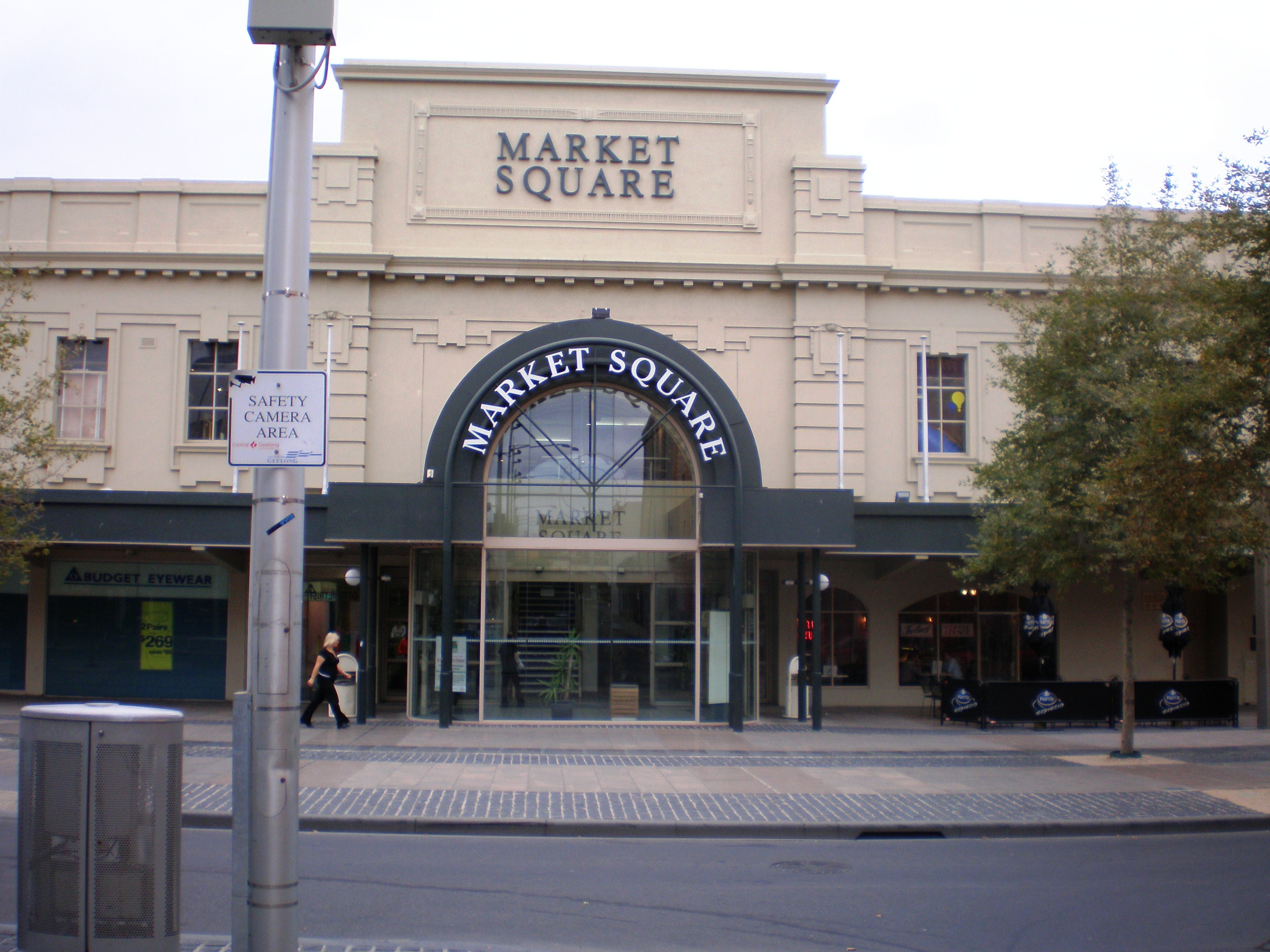
Entrance to Market Square from Little Malop Street.

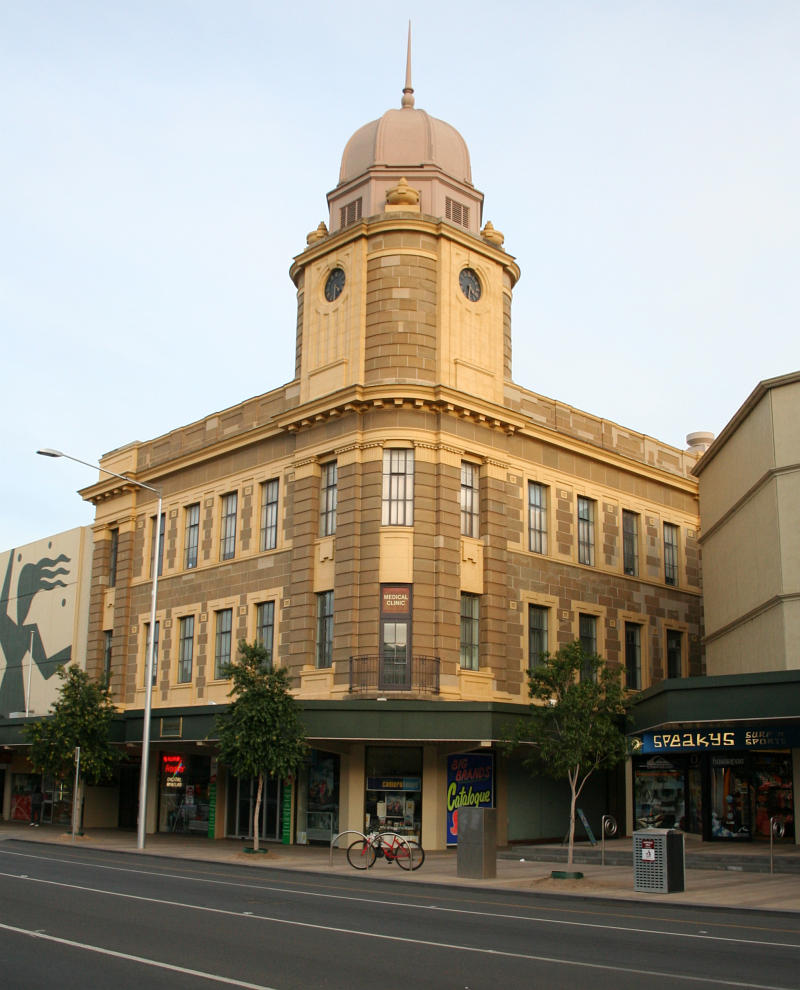
Retained CML building on Moorabool Street.

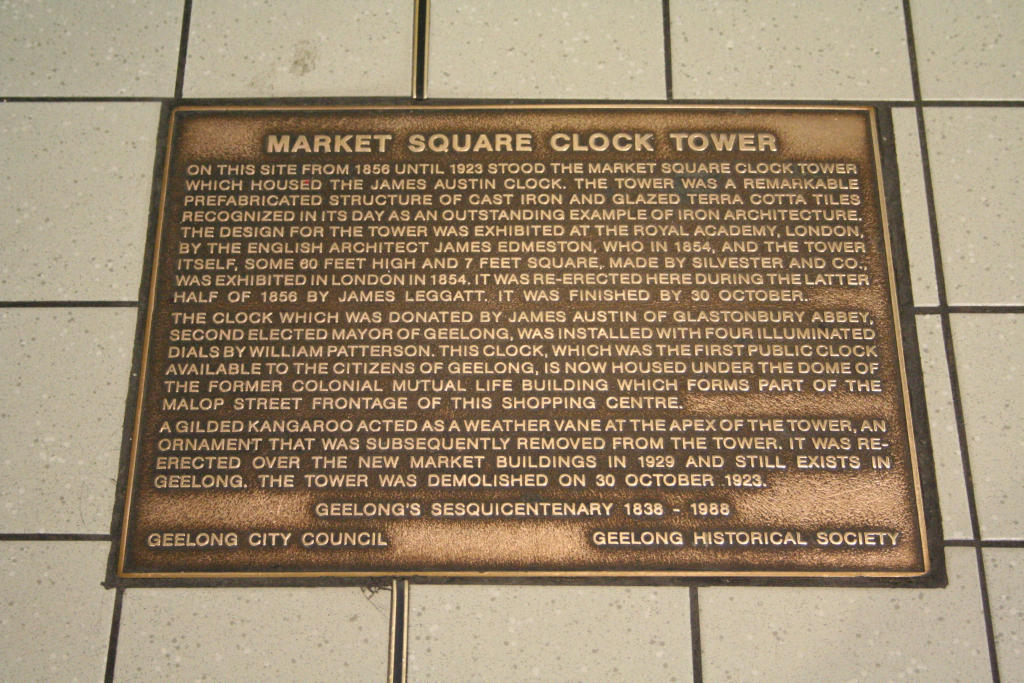
Plaque marking the site of the former clock tower.

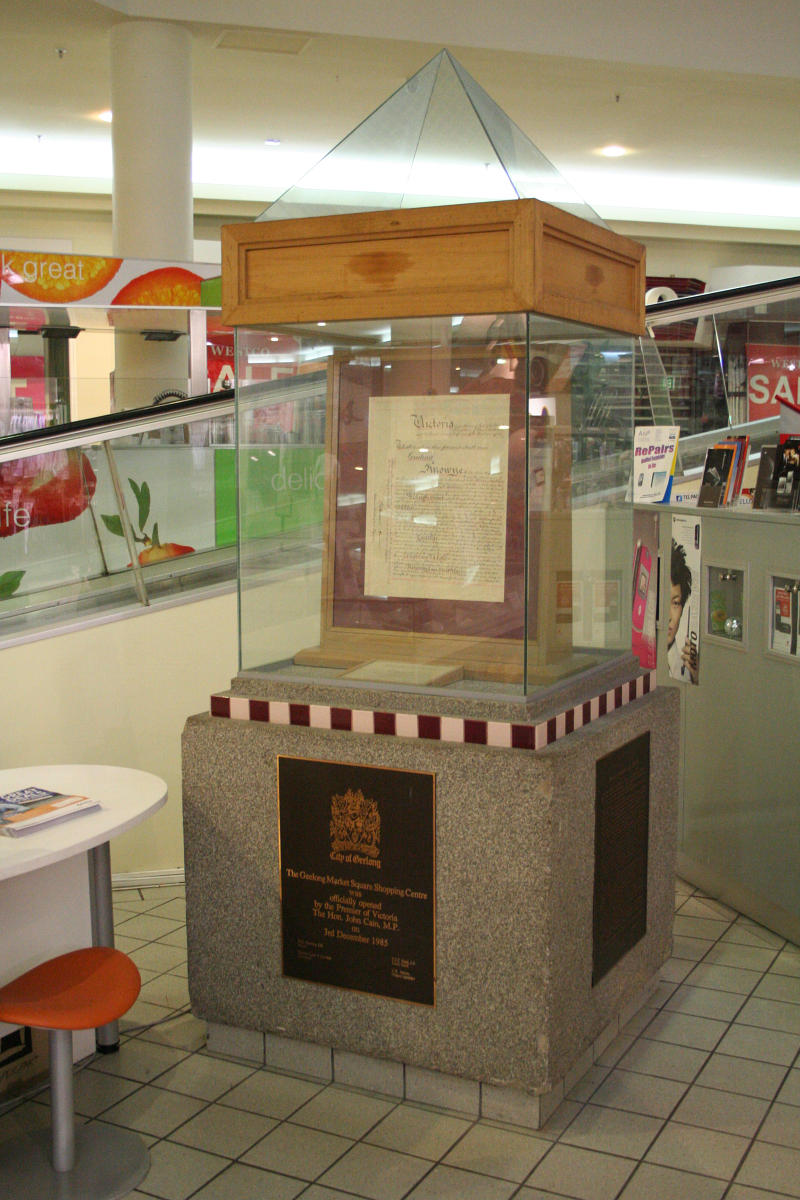
Historical display inside the centre

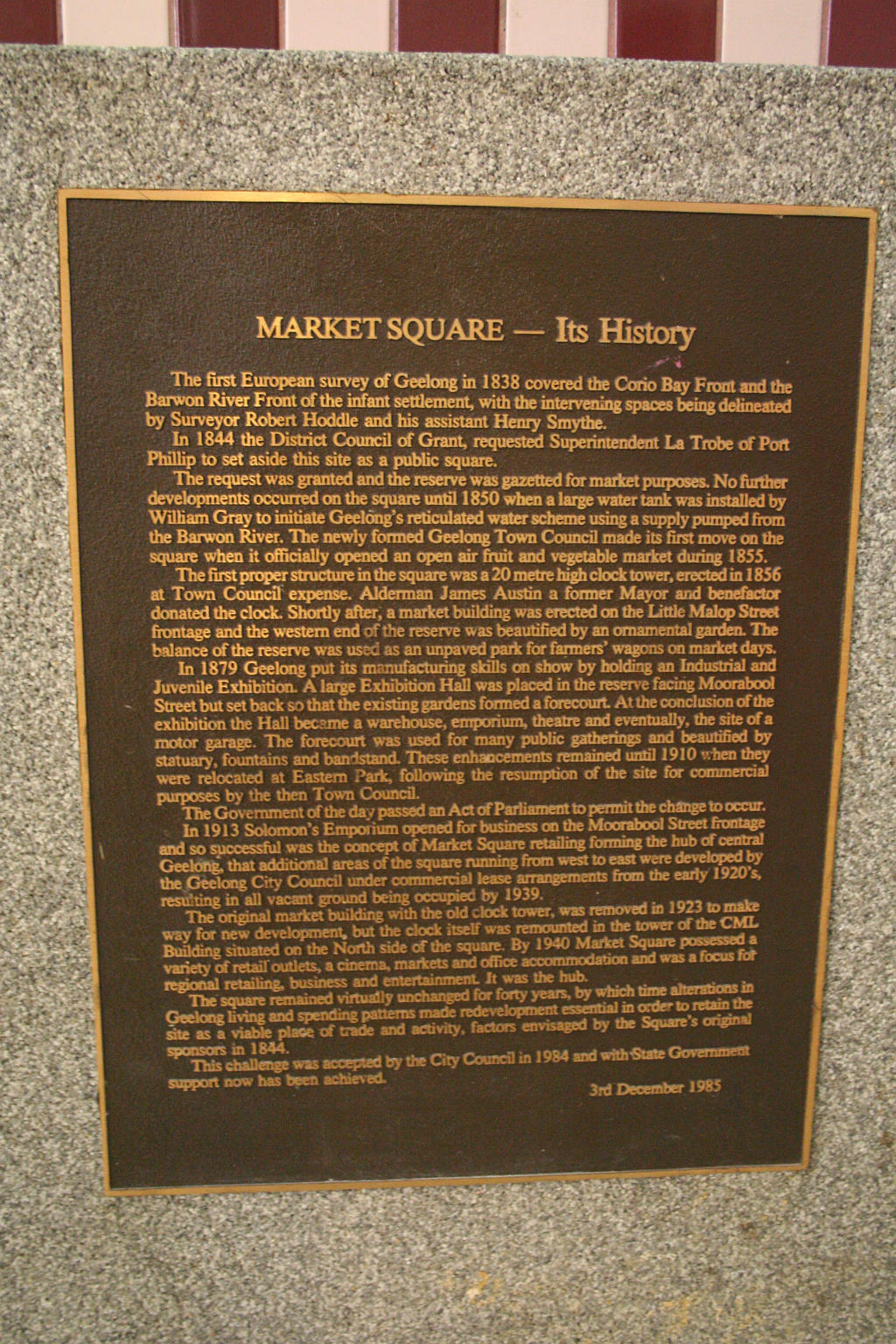
Plaque detailing the history of Geelong's Market Square

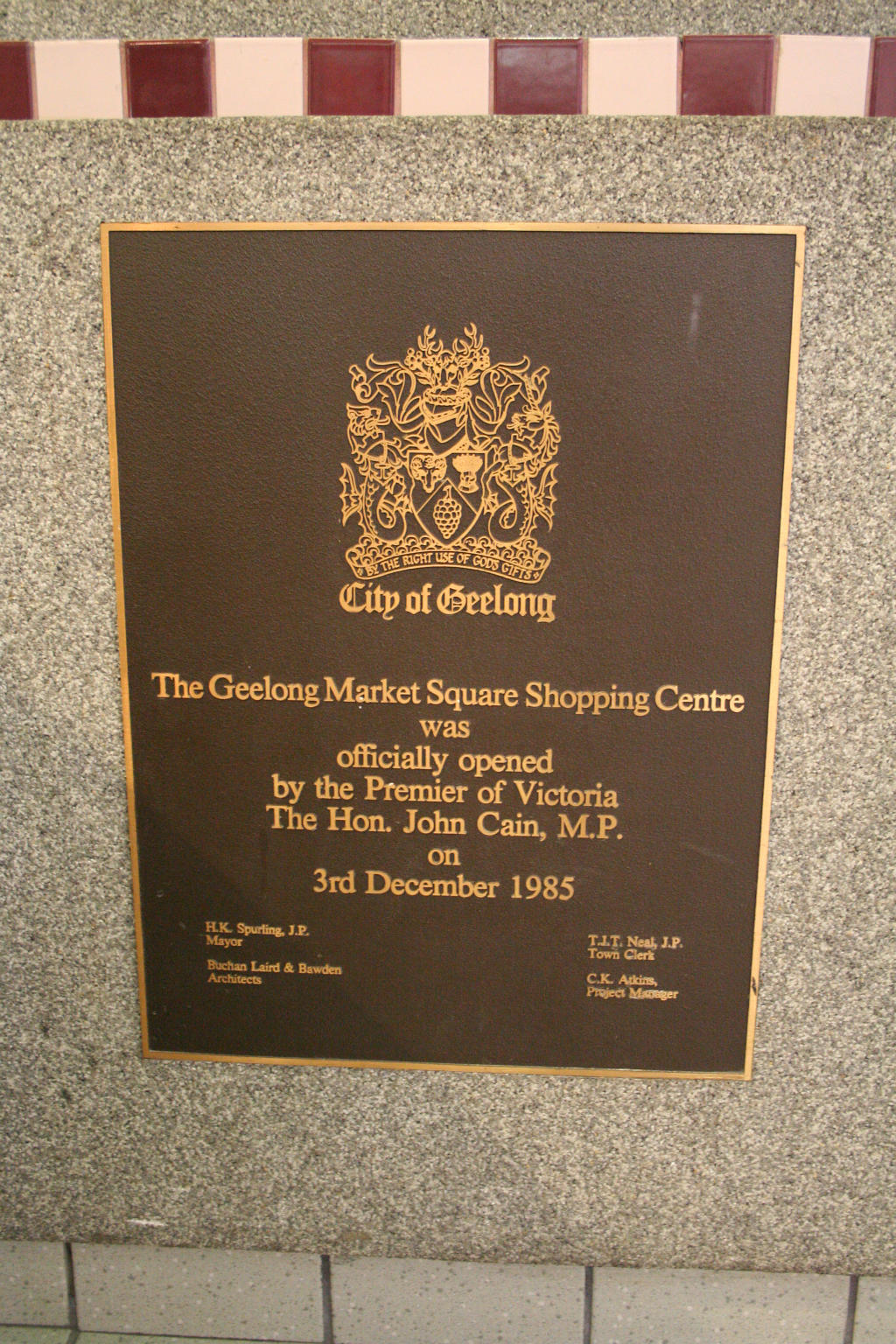
Plaque marking of the opening of the centre.

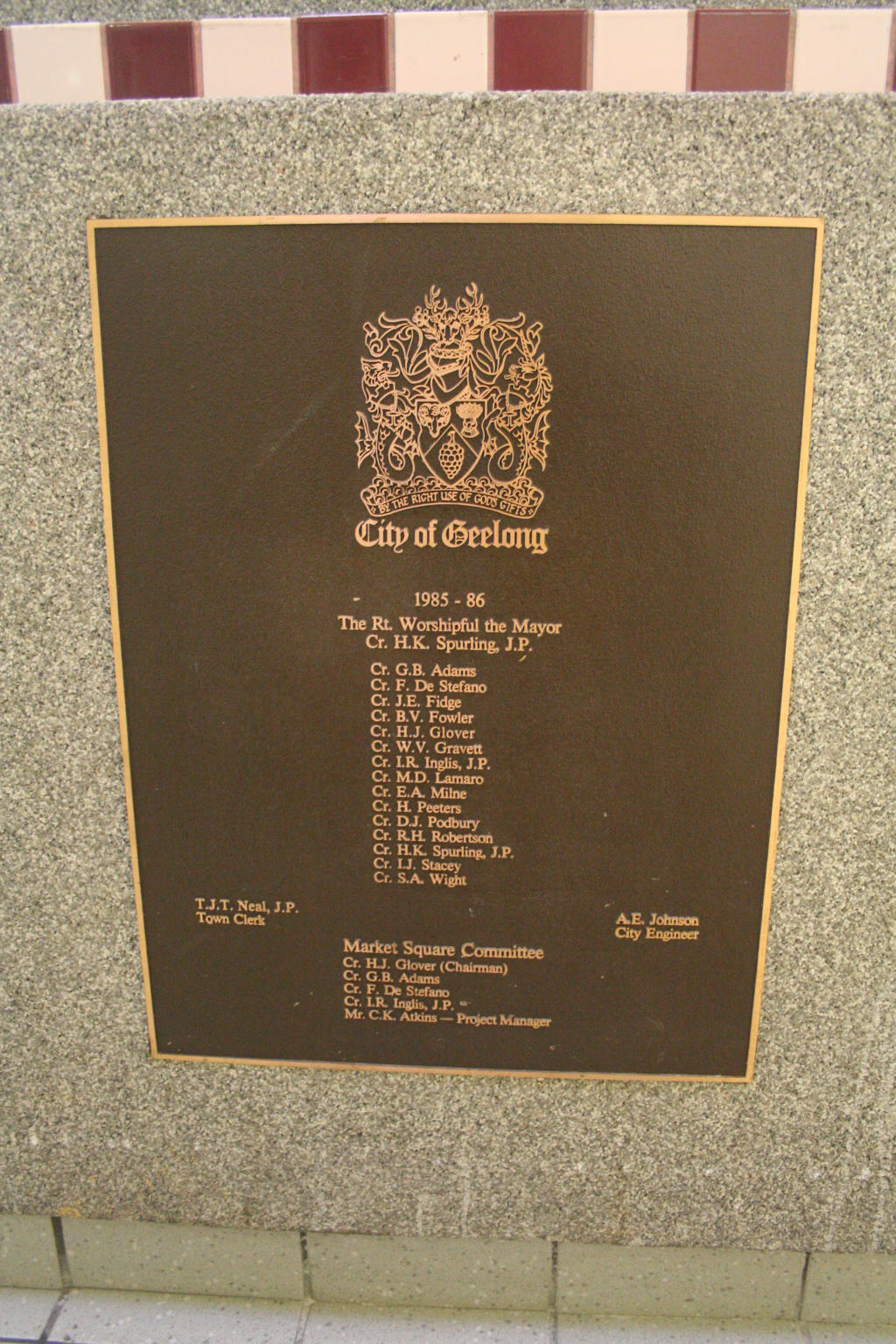
Plaque listing the composition of the City of Geelong when the centre opened.

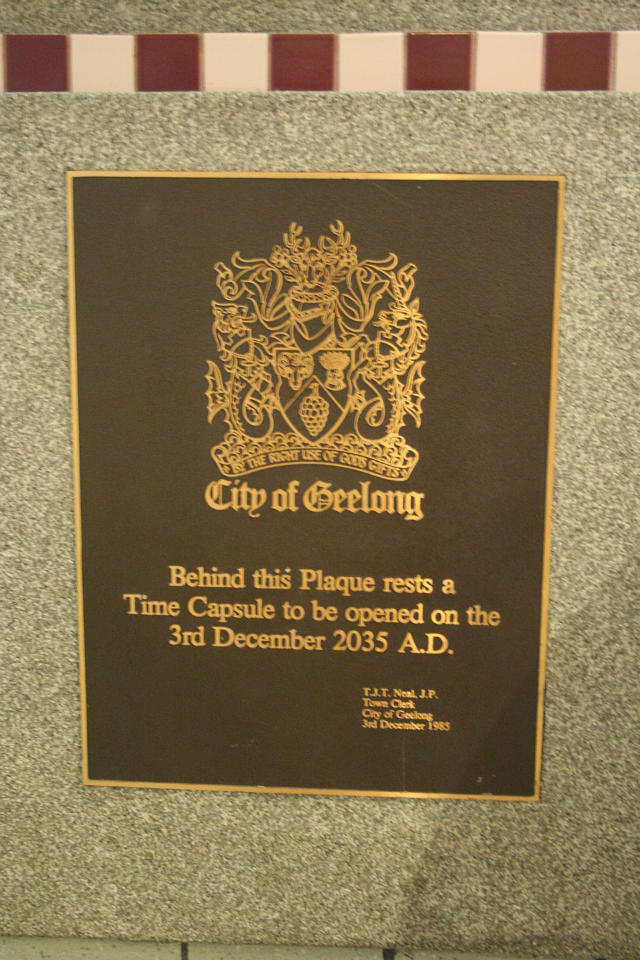
Plaque marking a time capsule to be opened in 2035.

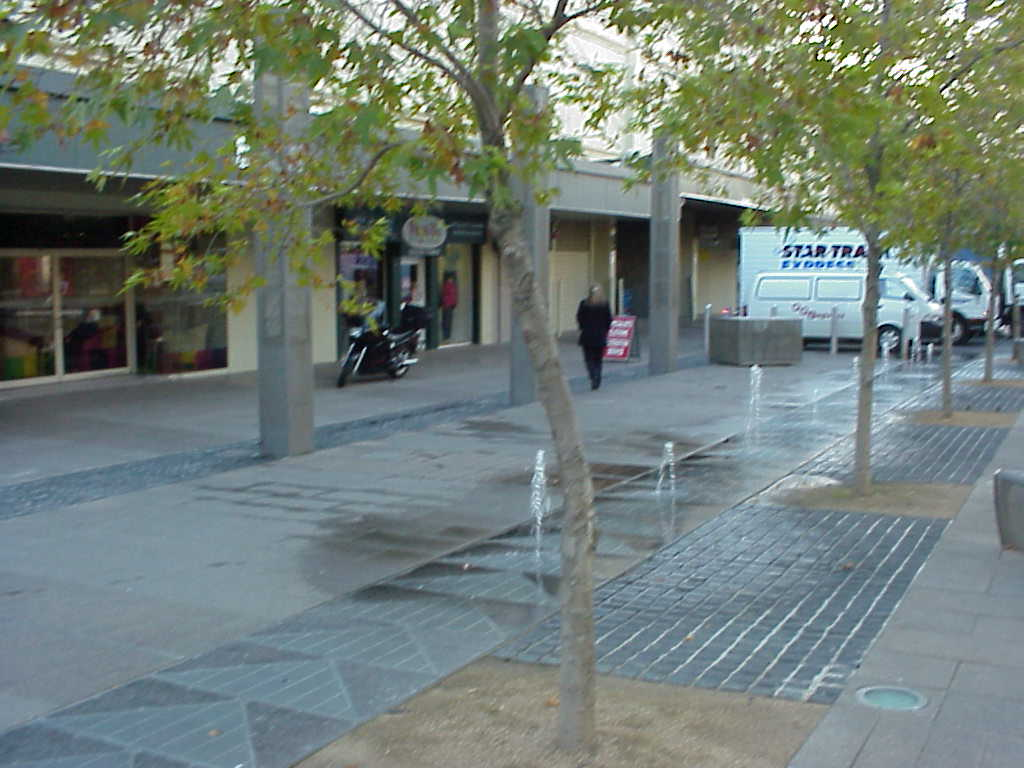
The fountains located outside Market Square Shopping Centre.
