= Digital public square =

A digital public square (DPS) is a user-driven website that relies upon user-generated content (UGC), created by a group of people with a common interest in a specific community. At its most basic, a digital public square represents an evolution in how people discover, read and share news, information and content. Users/content providers share the common goal of informing and becoming more informed about a shared geographic community or a community of ideas.

Modeled after the traditional “public square” where townspeople would gather to exchange views, a digital public square provides a virtual platform for the exploration of issues and the sharing of ideas, creativity and opinions while developing solutions to a community's challenges. A thriving digital public square has a rich content stream that may include video footage of community events and an interactive community record of nonprofit news and resources. The DPS offers a platform for dialogue and encourages people to connect in a virtual setting to establish relationships that can effect social change.

== History ==
The term “digital public square” was originally coined by the Community Foundation for Palm Beach and Martin Counties during the development of yourPBC.org. The site was created as a digital public square project for Palm Beach County, Florida, and was funded by a Civic Initiatives Leadership Grant from the John S. and James L. Knight Foundation.

== Structure ==
A digital public square is characterized by user-generated content, which may include featured discussions of topics of community interest; comments, ratings, multimedia, news articles, community news and events; an events calendar with community events and volunteer opportunities; and a resource center with published research and articles, community resources, and an extensive directory of social services.

== Examples ==
- yourPBC digital public square created by the Community Foundation for Palm Beach and Martin Counties, Inc.
- Tallahassee, FL digital public square project
- Coral Gables, FL digital public square project
- District of Columbia Digital Public Square

== See also ==
- Web 2.0
- Digital public infrastructure
