= List of Hunter College people =

The list of Hunter College people includes notable graduates, professors and other people affiliated with Hunter College of the City University of New York.

== Alumni ==
=== Nobel laureates ===
- Gertrude B. Elion – 1988, Medicine
- Rosalyn Sussman Yalow – 1977, Medicine

=== Pulitzer Prize winners ===
- Holland Cotter – art critic
- Emily Genauer – art critic
- Ada Louise Huxtable – architecture critic
- Liu Heung Shing – photographer
- James Wright – poet

=== National Medal of Science winners ===
- Mildred Cohn – 1982, Biological Sciences
- Mildred Dresselhaus – Engineering Sciences
- Gertrude B. Elion

=== Presidential Medal of Freedom winners ===
- Antonia Pantoja – activist

=== Science, technology, medicine, and mathematics ===
- Patricia Bath – ophthalmologist
- Marjorie Clarke – environmental scientist
- Mildred Cohn – National Medal of Science winner
- Mary P. Dolciani – mathematician
- Madeline Early – mathematician and university professor
- Elsie Giorgi – physician
- Erich Jarvis – neurologist
- Esther Lederberg – pioneer of bacterial genetics
- Lena Levine – psychiatrist, gynecologist, pioneer of marriage counseling and birth control
- Celia Maxwell – infectious disease physician and academic administrator
- Beatrice Mintz – pioneer of mammalian transgenesis
- Arlie Petters – pioneer of gravitational lensing
- Mina Rees – mathematician, president of the American Association for the Advancement of Science
- Ruth Teitelbaum – ENIAC programmer
- Rosalyn Sussman Yalow – Nobel Prize winner in Medicine

=== Business and economics ===
- Gerard Cafesjian – owner of West Publishing Corporation (now part of Thomson Corporation)
- Alan S. Chartock – president and CEO of WAMC
- Leon Cooperman – billionaire hedge fund manager
- Robert A. Daly – CEO of Warner Bros. and the Los Angeles Dodgers
- Mollie Orshansky – developer of the Orshansky Poverty Thresholds, the main poverty measure in the US
- Sylvia Field Porter – economist and journalist
- Melvin T. Tukman – co-founder and president of Tukman Grossman Capital Management, an investment firm

=== Law and politics ===
==== Members of Congress ====
- Bella Abzug – congresswoman, 1971–1977
- Eliot L. Engel – congressman, 1989–present
- Edna F. Kelly – congresswoman, 1949–1969

==== State figures ====
- Teresa Patterson Hughes – California state senator
- Roger Manno – Maryland House of Delegates

==== City figures ====
- Tony Avella – New York City councilman, 2009 candidate for mayor
- Adolfo Carrión Jr. – Bronx borough president
- Tom Murphy – mayor of Pittsburgh
- John Timoney – Miami chief of police

==== Lawyers ====
- Floria Lasky – prominent theater lawyer
- Soia Mentschikoff – chief developer of the Uniform Commercial Code and first woman to teach at Harvard Law School

==== Activists ====
- Norma Becker – anti-war activist
- Madeleine Cosman – health care and immigration advocate
- Alexander Dvorkin – anti-cult activist
- Theodora Lacey – civil rights activist
- Gertrude Lane – trade unionist
- Audre Lorde – activist, writer, poet
- Pauli Murray – activist, lawyer, priest, and author
- Antonia Pantoja – activist, Presidential Medal of Freedom winner
- Mamphela Ramphele – Rockefeller Foundation trustee, anti-apartheid activist
- Sandra Schnur – pioneer of disability rights
- Judith Vladeck – labor lawyer and civil rights advocate

=== Journalism and news ===
- Mohamad Bazzi – journalist
- Richard Cohen – Washington Post columnist
- Corine Hegland – journalist
- Jack Newfield – muckraking journalist
- Shimon Prokupecz – CNN reporter
- Daniel Seaman – Israeli politician; expert on the Arab-Israeli conflict

=== Literature ===
- Grace Andreacchi – writer
- Maurice Berger – cultural critic
- Peter Carey – writer
- Colin Channer – writer
- Helen Gray Cone – poet
- Lucy Dawidowicz – author
- Kaitlyn Greenidge – writer
- Martin Greif – writer, publisher
- Evan Hunter – author and screenwriter
- Ada Louise Huxtable – writer, Pulitzer Prize-winning architectural critic
- Colette Inez – poet, academic
- Swati Khurana – writer
- Malka Lee – poet
- Ricky Anne Loew-Beer – author, artist and photographer (married to fashion designer Ralph Lauren)
- Audre Lorde – poet, essayist
- Paule Marshall – author, MacArthur Fellow "genius grant," Dos Passos Prize for Literature
- Barbara McMartin – environmental writer
- Melissa Plaut – writer
- Sylvia Field Porter – economist, journalist
- Sonia Sanchez – poet
- Augusta Huiell Seaman – writer
- Sadia Shephard – writer
- Gary Shteyngart – author
- René Taupin – writer
- Ned Vizzini – writer
- Joan Wolf – writer of romance novels
- James Wright – poet

=== Film, theater, and television ===
- Ellen Barkin – actress
- Ed Burns – actor, director
- Eva Condon – Broadway actress
- Judith Crist – film critic
- Ruby Dee – actress
- Vin Diesel – actor
- Hugh Downs – broadcaster, 20/20 and The Today Show anchor
- Lynnie Godfrey – actress, singer, director
- Tina Howe – Tony-nominated playwright
- Richard Jeni – comedian
- Suzanne Kaaren – actress
- Ephraim Katz – author of The Film Encyclopedia
- Evelyn Lear – opera singer
- Natasha Leggero – actress and comic
- Maitland McDonagh – film critic
- Daniel Mulloy – screenwriter and film director
- Barbara Myers – former child model and actress
- Julianne Nicholson – actress
- Rhea Perlman – actress
- Dascha Polanco – actress
- Florence Ravenel – actress
- Regina Resnik – opera singer
- Esther Rolle – actress
- Al Santos – actor
- Elliot Tiber – screenwriter who "saved" Woodstock Festival
- Dreya Weber – producer

=== Art, architecture, and engineering ===
- Robert Altman – Rolling Stone photojournalist
- Firelei Báez – artist
- Robert Barry - artist
- Maurice Berger – art critic and historian
- Jack Coggins – illustrator
- Francisco Costa – creative director of Calvin Klein Collection
- Jules de Balincourt – artist
- Jacqueline Donachie – artist
- Mildred Dresselhaus – engineer
- Echo Eggebrecht – painter
- Arthur Elgort – photographer for Vogue magazine
- Gabriele Evertz – abstract artist
- Denise Green – painter
- Ada Louise Huxtable – architecture critic
- Mel Kendrick – artist
- Kathleen Kucka – painter
- Terrance Lindall – artist
- Robert Morris – sculptor
- Jill Nathanson – painter
- Doug Ohlson – abstract artist
- Lucy Olcott – art historian and dealer
- Danielle Orchard – painter
- Claudia Peña Salinas (MFA 2009) – mixed media artist
- Mitchell Silver – urban planner
- Jeff Sonhouse (MFA 2001) – painter
- Richard Tinkler – abstract artist
- Louis A. Waldman – art historian
- Dan Walsh – painter
- Brian Wood – visual artist

=== Music ===
- Ashley Choi – lead singer of the band Ladies' Code
- David Sampson – composer

=== Military ===
- Julia Jeter Cleckley – first African-American female line officer to be promoted to brigadier general in the Army National Guard
- Thomas P. Noonan, Jr. – Medal of Honor recipient

=== Education ===
- Robert Davila – ninth president of Gallaudet University
- Howard McParlin Davis – prominent art history professor
- John Taylor Gatto – author of seminal books on education
- Haskel Greenfield – archaeologist at University of Manitoba
- Francis Kilcoyne (died 1985) – president of Brooklyn College
- Soia Mentschikoff – chief developer of the Uniform Commercial Code and first woman to teach at Harvard University
- Burton Pike – professor emeritus, Comparative Literature, CUNY Graduate Center
- Jennifer Raab – president of Hunter College
- Henning Rübsam – choreographer, dance historian at The Juilliard School
- Kay Toliver – mathematics educator

=== Fictional alumni ===
- Chad Kroski from advertising campaign
- Harry "Parry" Sagan from The Fisher King
- Daniel Bae from The Sun Is Also a Star
- Marjorie Morningstar from the novel Marjorie Morningstar

=== Non-graduating attendees ===
- Harry Connick, Jr – musician
- Bobby Darin – musician
- Nikolai Fraiture – bassist, The Strokes
- April Lee Hernández – actress
- Mitski – musician
- Grace Paley – writer
- Nick Valensi – guitarist, The Strokes

== Faculty ==
- Meena Alexander – poet and author
- James Aronson – journalist, founder of the National Guardian
- John Avlon – author, speech writer for Rudy Giuliani
- Jacqueline Barton – chemist
- William Baziotes – painter
- Harry Binswanger – philosopher
- Gertrude Blanch – pioneer of numerical analysis and computation
- Robert A. Brady – economist
- José Ferrer Canales – writer, activist
- Rosario Candela – influential architect
- Peter Carey – novelist
- Tina Chang – poet
- Martin Chodorow – cognitive scientist
- John Henrik Clarke – historian
- Buck Clayton – musician
- Daniel I. A. Cohen – mathematician and computer scientist
- Janet Cox-Rearick – art historian
- Noah Creshevsky – composer
- Susan Crile – painter
- Emil Draitser – author
- Cora Du Bois – cultural anthropologist
- Stuart Ewen
- Norman Finkelstein – political scientist
- Mary Flanagan
- Helen Frankenthaler – artist
- Bertram Myron Gross – author of the Humphrey-Hawkins Full Employment Act
- John Hollander – poet, literary critic
- Seymour Itzkoff – researcher
- George E. Kimball – pioneer of operations research algorithms
- Dong Kingman – artist
- Lyman Kipp – sculptor
- Rosalind E. Krauss – art critic
- Reiner Leist – photographer
- Nancy Milford – author
- Paul Moravec – composer
- Robert Motherwell – artist
- Leonard Peikoff – philosopher, founder of the Ayn Rand Institute
- Mina Rees – mathematician
- Richard Reeves – political author
- Ruth Sager – geneticist
- Carolee Schneemann – artist
- Blake Schwarzenbach – musician
- Michael Shernoff – specialist in gay community mental health
- Tony Smith – sculptor
- Harry Edward Stinson – sculptor
- John Kennedy Toole – author
- Lionel Trilling – literary critic
- Nydia Velázquez – U.S. congresswoman, New York, 1993–present
- Alice von Hildebrand – philosopher and author
- Robert C. Weaver – first U.S. Secretary of Housing and Urban Development
- Blanche Colton Williams, professor of English literature and head of the English department

== Administration ==
- David A. Caputo – president of Hunter College; president of Pace University
- Paul LeClerc – president of Hunter College; president and CEO of New York Public Library
- Michael P. Riccards – political scientist; author; executive director of the Hall Institute for Public Policy
- Donna Shalala – U.S. Secretary of Health and Human Services; 10th president of Hunter College; president of University of Miami
