= Berry Campbell Gallery =

Art gallery in Manhattan, New York

Coordinates: 40°45′0″N 74°0′15″W

- Established: 2013
- Type: Art gallery
- Location: 524 West 26th Street, New York
- Website: berrycampbell.com

Berry Campbell Gallery is an art gallery in the Chelsea neighborhood of New York City. Its founders and directors are Christine Berry and Martha Campbell. The gallery focuses on historical and contemporary artists associated with American modernism.

== History ==
Christine Berry and Martha Campbell met while both were working at the Spanierman Gallery. They established Berry Campbell Gallery in 2013. In 2015, Berry Campbell Gallery took over a neighboring gallery space and expanded to 4,000 square feet. In September 2022 it moved to a 9,000 square foot location formerly occupied by Paula Cooper Gallery and Robert Miller Gallery.

== Program ==
Berry Campbell Gallery specializes in American abstract expressionism, with an emphasis on artists who have been historically overlooked due to their gender, age, or race. In a 2020 interview with Surface, Berry said that she and Campbell "discovered a gap in the Chelsea art scene" because the galleries in the area that did show well known "postwar and abstract expressionist" artists had largely been forgotten and that led to them opening the Berry Campbell Gallery to bring back those artists "to the forefront by telling their stories and showcasing their contributions to the movement".

Berry Campbell Gallery exhibitions have been widely reviewed by critics including Roberta Smith, Peter Plagens, and Donald Kuspit.

=== Exhibitions ===
After her death in 2010, a retrospective exhibition was held for the works of Charlotte Park in 2016 at the gallery, with Berry Campbell becoming the holder of Park's estate in the years following. A traveling exhibition of Syd Solomon's work titled "Syd Solomon: Concealed and Revealed" was featured at the gallery in July 2016. In May 2020, Ida Kohlmeyer's exhibition "Cloistered" was held at the gallery focusing on her abstract paintings involving symmetrical symbols. Edward Zutrau's works, also with the gallery as owners of his estate, were featured for the second time in an exhibition in June 2021 titled "Mandarin (Paintings from the 1950s)", described by the New York Observer as "colorful, giving, and showcase a decade-long fascination with abstract citrus-focused expression". An exhibit named "Lynne Drexler: The First Decade" was opened in October 2022 to showcase the work of the late Lynne Mapp Drexler, presenting the pieces she made between 1965 and 1969.

During the 2010s, multiple exhibitions by the Berry Campbell Gallery were given to the work of Walter Darby Bannard before and after his death in 2016, reviving his art from the "period of neglect" they had been in during the decades prior.

== Selected artists represented ==
- Edward Avedisian
- Stanley Boxer
- Dan Christensen
- Perle Fine
- Judith Godwin
- Raymond Hendler
- Jill Nathanson
- John Opper
- Elizabeth Osborne
- Stephen Pace
- William Perehudoff
- Ann Purcell
- Yvonne Thomas
- Frank Wimberley
- Larry Zox
