= Charlotte Park (artist) =

American painter

- Born: March 11, 1918; Concord, Massachusetts, U.S.
- Died: December 26, 2010 (aged 92); East Hampton, Long Island, New York, U.S.
- Resting place: Green River Cemetery
- Other name: Charlotte Park Brooks
- Education: Yale School of Fine Arts
- Employer: Office of Strategic Services
- Known for: artist
- Movement: Abstract expressionism
- Spouse: James Brooks

Charlotte Park, also known as Charlotte Park Brooks (1918–2010) was an American abstract painter.

Park, who worked as a graphic artist for the Office of Strategic Services intelligence agency during World War II, became a professional artist after the war. Working in studios in Manhattan and then in eastern Long Island, she was associated with and drew support and inspiration from her husband James Brooks and other first-generation abstract expressionist artists, including her neighbors Jackson Pollock, and Lee Krasner.

During most of her career, she neither sought nor received praise from critics and collectors, but late in life was celebrated for her artistic achievements and showed her work in prestigious solo and group exhibitions. At the end of her life a critic said, "Hers was a major gift all but stifled by a happily embraced domesticity and by the critical bullying of a brutally doctrinaire art world." (Note: The writer was Robert Pincus-Witten, writing in Art Forum (quoted in a posting on Hamptons Art Hub).)

== Early life and training ==
Park was born in Concord, Massachusetts, on March 11, 1918. She graduated from the Yale School of Fine Arts in 1939. (Note: From its founding as the nation's first university arts school in 1869 the School of Fine Arts at Yale accepted women students. Like their male counterparts, these women were expected to follow art as a profession.)

== Career ==
In 1941, while living in Washington, D.C., Park worked as a volunteer for the Federal Public Housing Authority. She subsequently took a position in a graphics unit of the Office of Strategic Services (OSS), the country’s first centralized intelligence agency. (Note: Park's work at OSS was quite likely in the Cartographic Section which produced specialty maps and other graphic aids for reports, presentations, and use in the field.) She met her future husband, artist James Brooks, there.

In 1945, Park moved to Manhattan, where she took night classes from Wallace Harrison, a Cubist painter who taught a geometric style of flat patterns. (Note: Wallace Harrison was an Australian-born artist and art teacher who lived and studied in Paris before settling in Manhattan. During the years following the close of World War II he maintained a studio in west Greenwich Village at 14th Street and 7th Avenue where he worked and taught. Helen Frankenthaler and Park's future husband, James Brooks, were also his students. A committed Cubist, he was, in the words of Frankenthaler, "a mad Francophile and crazy about Picasso and Lipchitz.") She shared studio space with Brooks, who had obtained it when his friends Jackson Pollock and Lee Krasner moved to East Hampton, Long Island. Park and Brooks married in 1947.

In 1949, the couple set up a studio in Montauk, Long Island. After a hurricane blew the building off its foundation in 1954, they moved what remained of it to an area of East Hampton called Springs and there set up a pair of adjoining studios now known as the Brooks-Park Heritage Project.

In 1949, Park began teaching at Leonard School for Girls; she later became an instructor at the Dalton School. Between 1955 and 1957, she taught at the People's Art Center of the Museum of Modern Art. (Note: The Leonard School for Girls was founded in 1937. It taught students from prekindergarten through high school. Subjects included arts, crafts, dramatics, music, sports, dancing, voice, and personality culture.) (Note: The People's Art Center of the Museum of Modern Art taught free classes in painting, ceramics, collage, and assemblage to children and adults over the years between 1948 and 1970. Victor D'Amico was its founder and director.) In 1952, she participated in a group show at the Peridot Gallery; the following year she had a painting in the Annual Exhibition of Contemporary American Painting at the Whitney Museum of American Art. (Note: The Peridot Gallery, at 6 E. 12th St. in Greenwich Village, specialized in shows of contemporary art by abstractionists, many of whom would, in time, be recognized as leaders of the Abstract Expressionist movement. In addition to her husband, James Brooks, they included Hans Hofmann, Willem de Kooning, Louise Bourgeois, Jackson Pollock, and Philip Guston.) In 1954, she participated in a group show at the Guild Hall in East Hampton. The Tanager Gallery in Manhattan presented her first solo show in 1957. Park showed often during the later 1950s, particularly in group exhibitions at Eleanor Ward's Stable Gallery. (Note: The Stable Gallery became famous for its mid-1950s exhibitions of Abstract Expressionists, women as well as men. Its 1954 annual included Helen Frankenthaler, Louise Nevelson, Grace Hartigan, Louise Bourgeois, Joan Mitchell, Lee Krasner, Elaine de Kooning. In 2001 Hilton Kramer, critic for the New York Observer said, "At Eleanor Ward's Stable Gallery, the annual exhibitions of contemporary American art were often of far greater artistic interest than the annual or biennial surveys at the Whitney Museum.")

She showed infrequently during the 1960s. Records show that her work appeared in Manhattan at group shows at the Tanager Gallery (1959), the James Gallery (1960), and the Alonzo Gallery (1969) and, on Long Island, in group shows at East Hampton Guild Hall (1960), Setauket Gallery North (1965), and Southampton Parrish Art Museum (1970). (Note: Tanager, James, Alonzo, Guild Hall, Gallery North, Parrish)

She showed more frequently in the 1970s, including solo exhibitions at the Benson Gallery (1973 and 1976) and the Guild Hall (1979) as well as group exhibitions in those and other Long Island galleries. Her work was also included in a 1979 group show at the American Cultural Center in Paris.

In the 1980s, Park's output declined. Most later exhibitions of her work were retrospective. These shows include a 1981 joint exhibition with Brooks at Himelfarb Gallery, East Hampton; a 1985 show called Hampton Artists at the Arbitrage Gallery in Manhattan; a 1991 show of works on paper from members of the New York School at Elston Fine Arts in New York; a 1995 show of Women in the Fifties at the Anita Shapolsky Gallery in New York; and solo exhibitions at the Parrish Art Museum (2002) and Spanierman Modern (2010). She was given a major retrospective at the Berry Campbell Gallery in 2016.

=== Artistic style and critical reception ===
I don't want to be known as a female artist. I want to be known as a good artist.

Charlotte Park, Untitled (Black and Gray IV), about 1950, gouache on paper, 17 7/8 x 22 15/16 inches

Charlotte Park, Aztec, about 1955, oil on canvas, 22 x 13 inches

Charlotte Park, Untitled, about 1960, oil on canvas, 34 x 34 inches

Charlotte Park, Gypsophilia, 1973, acrylic on canvas, 18 x 18 inches

Charlotte Park, Untitled, about 1985, acrylic on paper, 14 x 14 inches

Park was a first-generation abstract expressionist who favored both geometric and gestural forms. Although she drew inspiration from natural objects, her paintings are non-representational. She liked to visit other East Hampton artists in their studios and picked up ideas from seeing their work.

Park worked on both paper and canvas. She made gouaches, oils, collages, and acrylics. Her paintings tended to be smaller than those of other abstract expressionist artists. In the early 1950s she often made black and white as well as colored gouache paintings on paper and also made gestural drawings in this period. A critic said of this work, in general, that "Ms. Park effortlessly reconciled painting and drawing, deriving a lively formal vocabulary from clusters of loops and spheres." Of the work on paper in particular, another critic wrote: "Complex interactive layering animates the painted surfaces, which often conceal as much as they reveal. Organic and calligraphic shapes jockey for position, yet are held firmly in place by implicit structure." Later in the decade she made some larger oil paintings mostly employing subtler color choices than before. Her handling of oils at this time included the use of a palette knife to apply and scrape off pigment. Discussing this technique, a critic for the New York Times said she scraped, built up, and revised to create "a varied, sensuously appealing surface." At the end of the decade she made collages, often cutting up and re-assembling parts of earlier paintings. During the 1960s she leaned toward square-shaped paintings and softer colors than previously.

Park's untitled gouache in black and gray, painted about 1950 (shown at right), shows her handling of this medium in the absence of colors at this time. Her painting entitled Aztec of about 1955 (shown at left) is an example of her early use of oil on canvas while the untitled painting of about 1960 (shown at right) is an example of her later use of the medium.

In the 1970s she made acrylic drawings on paper and canvas that gave the effect, as a critic said, of a geometric pattern in which "form and space can be made to seem interchangeable in the eye." During the next decade and until Alzheimer's forced her to retire from painting she created relatively small paintings and drawings in which areas of bright color are offset by areas of white. A critic saw in these works echoes of Piet Mondrian and Paul Klee. Another critic described them at some length: "There is a special kind of refinement in the way Charlotte Park's paintings and drawings stretch the eye and increasingly absorb the mind with gentle, abstract color delineations and their subtle, lost and found, dissolving echoes. These echoes establish soft, engaging visual complexities ... Part of the unusual effect is in the feeling of participation in visually completing the suggested connections, or associations. Some lines meet in ways that invoke illusions of structures; others curve and float independently, offering a more abstract engagement. The sense of boundless white infinity is important as a field for reflections and vibrancy."

Park's Gypsophilia of 1973 (at left) shows her late use of acrylic on canvas and her untitled painting of about 1985 (shown at right) shows her use of acrylic on paper at an even later date.

She did not ordinarily give titles to works and when she did she used terms that evoked feelings rather than natural objects. She once said that she drew inspiration for a group of paintings she made about 1955—ones entitled Aztec, Initiation, Parade, and Lament—from the black paintings of Francisco Goya.

Park achieved critical recognition late in life. Writing late in her career a critic thought she was probably better known as the wife of James Brooks than as an abstract expressionist artist. A critic for the New York Times wrote in 2010: "It is probably too late for Charlotte Park, now over 90 and suffering from Alzheimer's disease, to witness her ascension into the ranks of widely known Abstract Expressionists. A natural painter and gifted colorist, she is as good as several of the artists—both men and women—in the Museum of Modern Art's current tribute to the movement, which was drawn almost entirely from its collection." An East Hampton artist who knew her well said that Park believed her husband was too introverted to become successful without active management on her part. He says "it was clear that it would take a huge effort just to keep Jim’s career alive. Charlotte knew how things were slanted, and that only he really had a chance at that point in time, so she put her weight behind him so they both could survive as artists. Unfortunately, there really was no better choice at the time." (Note: He added that "Thanks to the joint effort, they did succeed and managed to live comfortably off the sales of his work for the last 50 years of their lives. Charlotte actually reveled in this and in her support of her husband, and had no envy or bitterness, another indication of her great character and dignity. Her husband’s success allowed them both to paint and live the way they wanted to live, unencumbered by having to hold steady jobs. Occasional teaching was the only ancillary work they performed; she taught art at MoMA and was a favorite of the many artists’ kids who took her classes there.")

== Personal life and family ==
Park was born in Concord, Massachusetts, on March 11, 1918. At the time the local registrar recorded her surname as Parke. However, other official contemporaneous records give the spelling she used.

Her father, George Coolidge Park, died five months before her birth. Initially, she lived in Concord with her brother George and mother Harriet Maybel Hawkes Park at the home of Harriet's parents, Frank W. and Hattie A. Hawkes. When Harriet remarried, to Harold Blaisdell Shepard, the family moved to Washington, D.C.

An OSS colleague introduced Charlotte Park to her future husband, James Brooks, in 1945. Wishing to become a professional artist, she moved to Manhattan where she took an apartment in Gramercy Park. Brooks, who had lived in Manhattan before the war, returned there, and the two were married in 1947. They had no children. In 1949, they moved to Montauk, New York.

Park died on December 26, 2010, at her home in East Hampton.

== Legacy ==
In 2016, her biography was included in the exhibition catalogue Women of Abstract Expressionism organized by the Denver Art Museum. In 2023, her work was included in the exhibition Action, Gesture, Paint: Women Artists and Global Abstraction 1940-1970 at the Whitechapel Gallery in London.
