= Jodi Hays =

American painter (born 1976)

- Born: 1976 (age 49–50); Hot Springs, Arkansas
- Citizenship: American
- Occupation: Painter
- Website: jodihays.com

Jodi Hays (born 1976) is an American collage painter. Her work often engages humble materials and art-historical knowledge.

== Background ==
=== Early life and education ===
Hays was born in Hot Springs, Arkansas in 1976. She earned a BFA from The University of Tennessee and an MFA from Vermont College of Fine Arts.

=== Career ===
Hays served as gallery director at Tennessee State University, where she authored projects with Pope.L and Shaun Leonardo. During the COVID-19 pandemic, she started using used cardboard as an artistic material while in social isolation. She presented The Find, a solo exhibition of mixed-media works, at Night Gallery in Los Angeles in 2022. The exhibition featured layered abstract compositions incorporating reclaimed cardboard, textiles, paper, dye, and paint. Several works in the exhibition including Canaan and Darkest Hour, incorporated dyed and assembled cardboard, while others combined textiles, paper collage, and painted surfaces.

Hays has received grants from the Rauschenberg Foundation, the Foundation for Contemporary Arts, the Sustainable Arts Foundation, the Tennessee Arts Commission, and the Elizabeth Firestone Graham Foundation, among others.

She works within the tradition of abstraction, incorporating contrasting colors, stripes, grids, and geometric forms suggestive of urban landscapes and architecture. Her layered compositions explore themes of place and the built environment, examining how constructed spaces influence both individual and collective experience. Her work often engages humble materials and art-historical knowledge.

== Exhibitions ==
Hays has exhibited across the United States in solo, two-person, and group exhibitions at galleries and museums.

=== Selected solo exhibitions ===
- Befores and Afters, David Lusk Gallery, Tennessee (2025)
- To Harden and Heal, Johnson Lowe Gallery, Atlanta, Georgia (2025)
- Start from Scratch, Vanderbilt University, Tennessee (2024)
- The Find, Night Gallery, Los Angeles, California (2022)
- Jodi Hays: Past Present, ZieherSmith, New York (2021)
- The Browsing Room, Tennessee (2020)
- Tend, Red Arrow Gallery, Tennessee (2019)
- Keeper, Red Arrow Gallery, Tennessee (2017)

=== Selected two-person exhibitions ===
- The Burden of Wait, (with Michi Meko), Susan Inglett Gallery, New York (2023)
- Everso (with Katrin Schnabl), Devening Projects, Chicago, Illinois (2023)

=== Selected group exhibitions ===
- In Her Place, Frist Art Museum, Tennessee (2026)
- Cardboard: Infinite Possibilities, Wonzimer Gallery, Los Angeles (2025)
- Painting Deconstructed, Ortega y Gasset, Brooklyn (2024)
- The Future is Female, 21 C Museum Hotel, Tennessee (2022)
- B18: Wiregrass Biennial, Wiregrass Museum of Art, Alabama (2018)

=== Museum and public collections ===
- Birmingham Museum of Art
- Tennessee State Museum
- The J Crew Group
- Arkansas Museum of Fine Arts
