= Salut Tom =

1979 oil on canvas quadtych painting by Joan Mitchell

Salut Tom is a 1979 oil on canvas quadtych painting by Joan Mitchell, dedicated to the memory of her friend, art critic and curator Thomas B. Hess, who had died the previous year. The work is in the permanent collection of the National Gallery of Art in Washington DC and entered the museum as part of the collection the national Gallery was given by the board of the Corcoran Gallery when that art institution closed in 2014.

The work was included in the 2016-2017 exhibition Abstract Exoressionism at the Royal Academy of Art in London. The work is also included in the large scale survey of the painter's life work. Joan Mitchell which has stops at three venues from 2021 to 2023 at SFMOMA in San Francisco, the Baltimore Museum of Art in Baltimore, Maryland, and the Louis Vuitton Foundation in Paris, France.
