= Domination of Black =

Poem by Wallace Stevens

"Domination of Black" is a poem in Wallace Stevens' Harmonium, first published in 1916 (and later in 1942), and selected by him as his best poem for the anthology This Is My Best.

Domination of Black

At night, by the fire,
The colors of the bushes
And of the fallen leaves,
Repeating themselves,
Turned in the room,
Like the leaves themselves
Turning in the wind.
Yes: but the color of the heavy hemlocks
Came striding.
And I remembered the cry of the peacocks.

The colors of their tails
Were like the leaves themselves
Turning in the wind,
In the twilight wind.
They swept over the room,
Just as they flew from the boughs of the hemlocks
Down to the ground.
I heard them cry—the peacocks.
Was it a cry against the twilight
Or against the leaves themselves
Turning in the wind,
Turning as the flames
Turned in the fire,
Turning as the tails of the peacocks
Turned in the loud fire,
Loud as the hemlocks
Full of the cry of the peacocks?
Or was it a cry against the hemlocks?

Out of the window,
I saw how the planets gathered
Like the leaves themselves
Turning in the wind.
I saw how the night came,
Came striding like the color of the heavy hemlocks
I felt afraid.
And I remembered the cry of the peacocks.

== Interpretation ==
The poem can be compared to imagist paintings of the period such as Klee's "Blaue Nacht", Klee's shades of blue replaced by Stevens' colors of the night. Stevens adds unsettling elements. The poem unfolds like a little horror show. A fire creates flickering images of the colors of bushes and leaves, which themselves turn in the wind. Also the color of heavy hemlocks "came striding", as from the river Styx ("the Stygian hemlocks", in Vendler's phrase). Ambiguous peacocks descend from the hemlocks. Then the poet notices outside his window the planets gathering isomorphically, "Like the leaves themselves", and the night came striding. The threat of darkness (death? suicide?) is palpable: "I felt afraid."

See also "Tea", which, like "Domination of Black", demonstrates "all the troping of leaves through the collection".

Musical compositions inspired by the poem include Tesserae F - "Domination of Black" for solo bass clarinet by Justin Connolly and Robin Holloway's Domination of Black op. 23 for symphony orchestra (1973–74), which was premiered at the BBC Proms by the Bavarian Radio Symphony Orchestra conducted by Elgar Howarth.

The painter Joan Mitchell named an important work of hers Hemlock (1956) after what she termed "the dark and blue feeling" of the poem and its multiple references to the hemlock plant.

== Bibliography ==
- Vendler, Helen. Words Chosen Out of Desire. 1984: University of Tennessee Press.
- Cook, Eleanor. A Reader's Guide to Wallace Stevens. 2007: Princeton University Press.
- Connolly, Justin. Tesserae F - "Domination of Black". 1999: Novello and Co, London
