= James Brooks (painter) =

American abstract expressionist, muralist, abstract painter, art teacher (1906–1992)

James D. Brooks
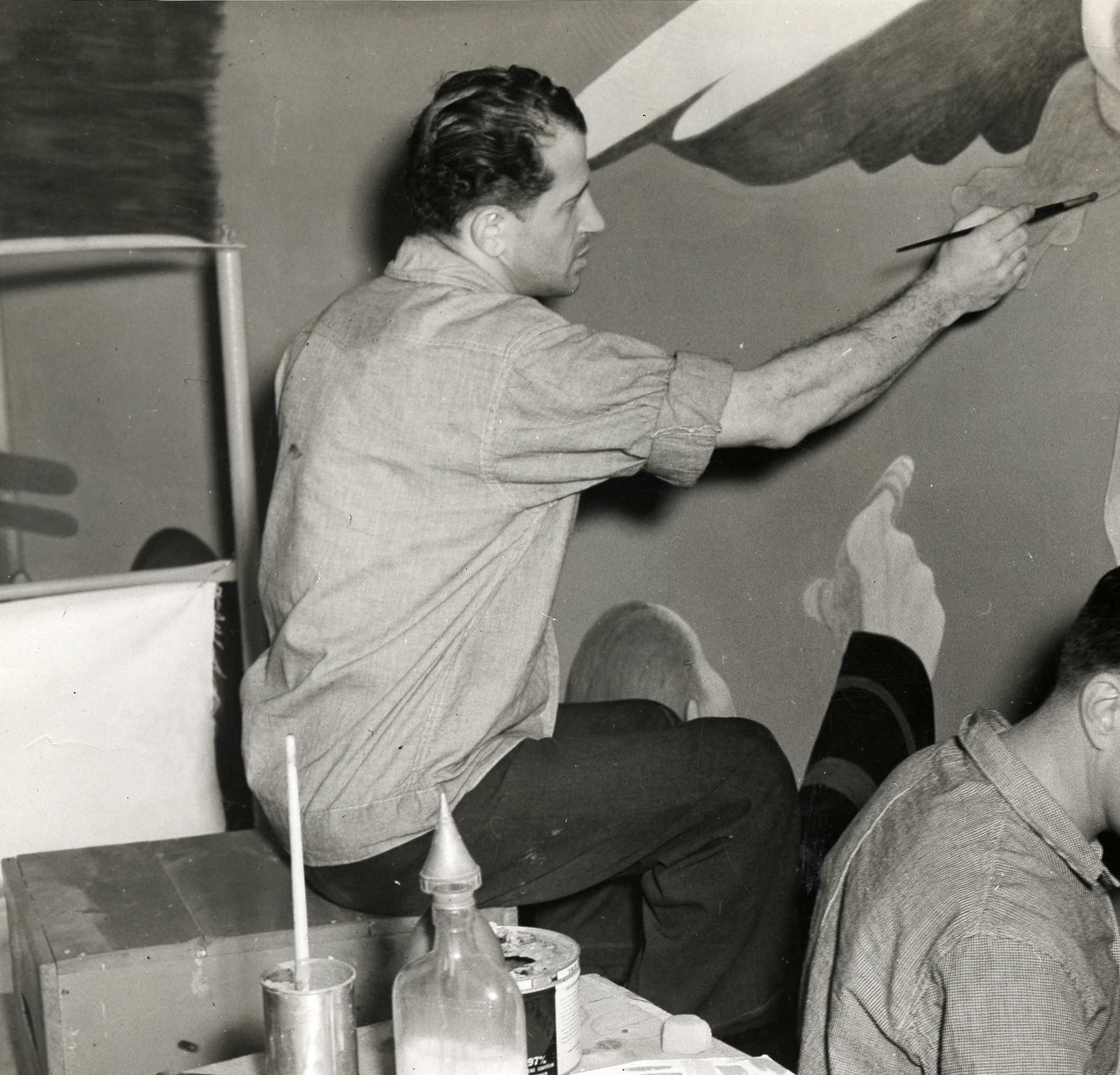
- Brooks working on a mural, 1940
- Born: October 18, 1906; St. Louis, Missouri, U.S.
- Died: March 9, 1992 (aged 85); Brookhaven, New York, U.S.
- Known for: Painting, Muralism
- Movement: Abstract expressionism, action painting, lyrical abstraction

James David Brooks (October 18, 1906 – March 9, 1992) was an American abstract expressionist, muralist, abstract painter, art teacher, and winner of the Logan Medal of the Arts.

== Life and career ==
Brooks was born in St. Louis, Missouri, in 1906. He attended Southern Methodist University and the Dallas Art Institute. In 1926, he moved to New York, where he worked as a commercial letterer and display artist and attended night classes at the Art Students League.

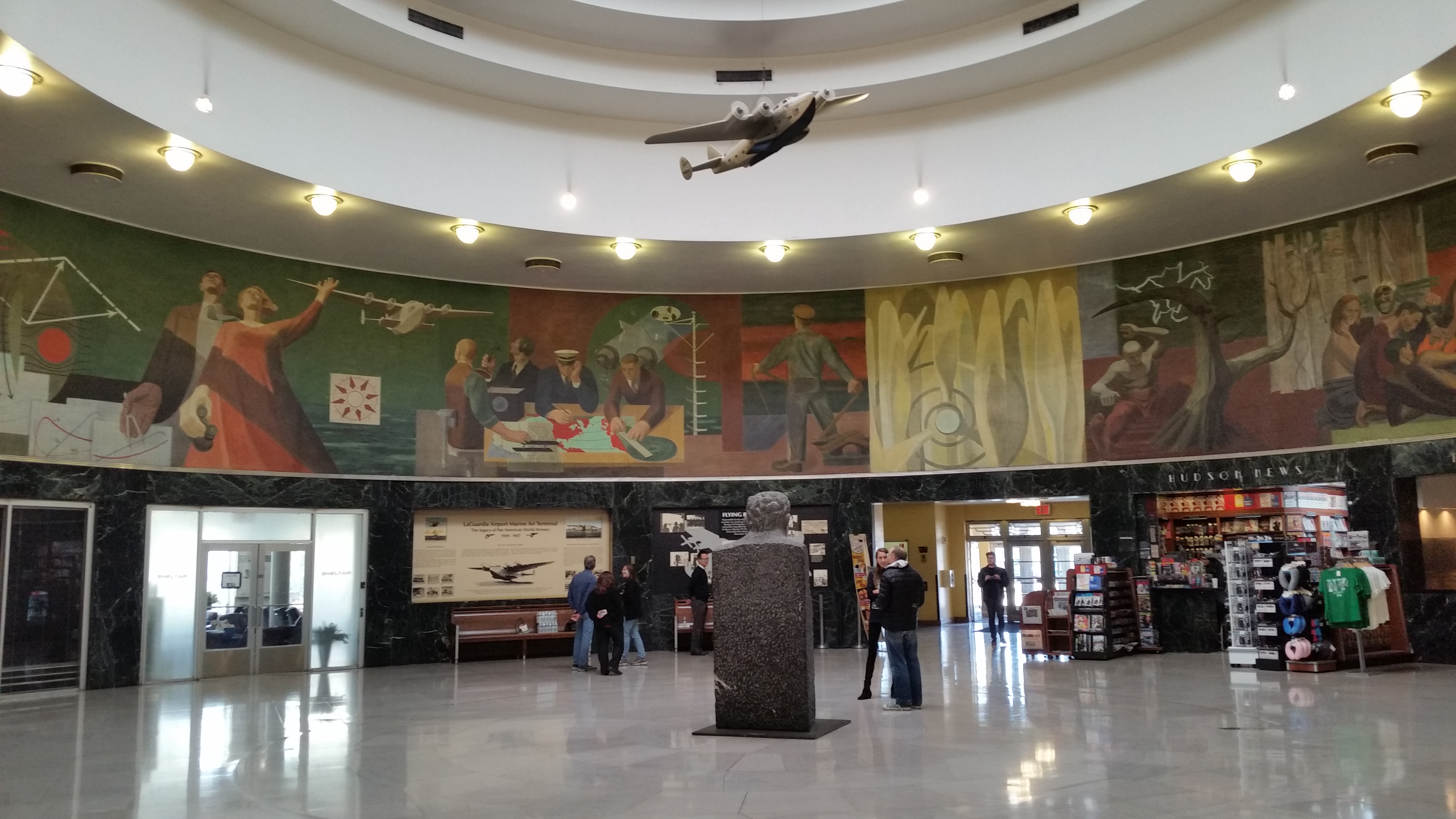
Brooks's mural Flight at the Marine Air Terminal

Between 1936 and 1942, Brooks participated in the Federal Art Project and the U.S. Department of the Treasury's Section of Fine Arts. By submitting design proposals to several competitions, he secured three significant public works commissions. These include the only original surviving mural: "Labor and Leisure", a 1938 work in New Jersey's Little Falls Civic Center. A 1937 mural painted in a public library in Woodside, Queens was destroyed in the 1960s. Between 1938 and 1942, he painted a 235-foot mural entitled "Flight" around the rotunda of the Marine Air Terminal at La Guardia Airport. The mural was painted over by the Port Authority in the 1950s but restored in 1980.

Between 1942 and 1945, Brooks was enlisted as a combat artist with the American military. Based in Cairo, he traveled to Palestine; Benghazi, Libya; and other parts of Egypt during this time, photographing American military camps, the aftermath of combat, and locals. From these photographs, he created a series of drawings and gouache paintings that were then submitted to the Army.

Upon returning to the U.S. in 1946, he worked in Washington, D.C., where he met artist Charlotte Park. Brooks was a friend of Jackson Pollock and Lee Krasner; he moved into Pollock's Greenwich Village apartment at 46 East 8th Street after Pollock and Krasner moved to Springs in East Hampton, New York, in 1945.

Considered a first-generation abstract expressionist painter, Brooks was among the first abstract expressionists to use staining as an important technique. Brooks had his first one-man exhibition of his abstract expressionist paintings in 1950 at the Peridot Gallery in New York, where he displayed some "dripped" paintings that reflected Pollock's influence. According to art critic Carter Ratcliff, "His concern has always been to create painterly accidents of the kind that allow buried personal meanings to take on visibility." In his paintings from the late 1940s, Brooks began to dilute his oil paint in order to stain the mostly raw canvas. These works often combined calligraphy and abstract shapes.

In 1947, Brooks and Park married. Two years later, they moved to East Hampton and set up a studio at Rocky Point in Montauk. His work was displayed in the 9th Street Art Exhibition in 1951.

In 1954, Hurricane Carol blew the studio from its hill, destroying several of Brooks' paintings. Brooks had their undamaged house barged to Springs and installed on an 11-acre parcel on Neck Path close to Pollock's home.

Brooks died in 1992, of Alzheimer's disease in Brookhaven Memorial Hospital in Brookhaven, Long Island. Park died in 2010.

The couple had no children, and left their house and studios vacant. In 2013, the property was sold to the Town of East Hampton, which planned to demolish the buildings. A preservation campaign led the town to abandon the plan and in February 2017, officials announced plans to restore the studio and house, noting that Brooks paint cans were still in the studio.

Boon, oil on canvas, 1957, Tate Gallery

Public collections holding works by Brooks include: the Hyde Collection (Glens Falls, NY), Governor Nelson A. Rockefeller Empire State Plaza Art Collection (Albany, New York), Courtauld Institute of Art (London), the Dallas Museum of Art (Dallas, Texas), the Museum of Modern Art (New York, New York), the Harvard University Art Museums, the Whitney Museum of American Art (New York, New York), the Honolulu Museum of Art, the Indianapolis Museum of Art (Indianapolis, Indiana), the Sheldon Art Gallery (Lincoln, Nebraska), the Smithsonian American Art Museum (Washington, D.C.), the Tate Gallery (London) and the Walker Art Center (Minneapolis, Minnesota). His works were also exhibited by galleries including the Anita Shapolsky Gallery in New York City, the Peridot Gallery in New York, and Washburn Gallery in New York.

== Education ==
- 1923–1926: Southern Methodist University; Dallas Art Institute and with Martha Simkins.
- 1927–1930: The Art Students League of New York, New York City; night classes with Kimon Nicolaides and Boardman Robinson.

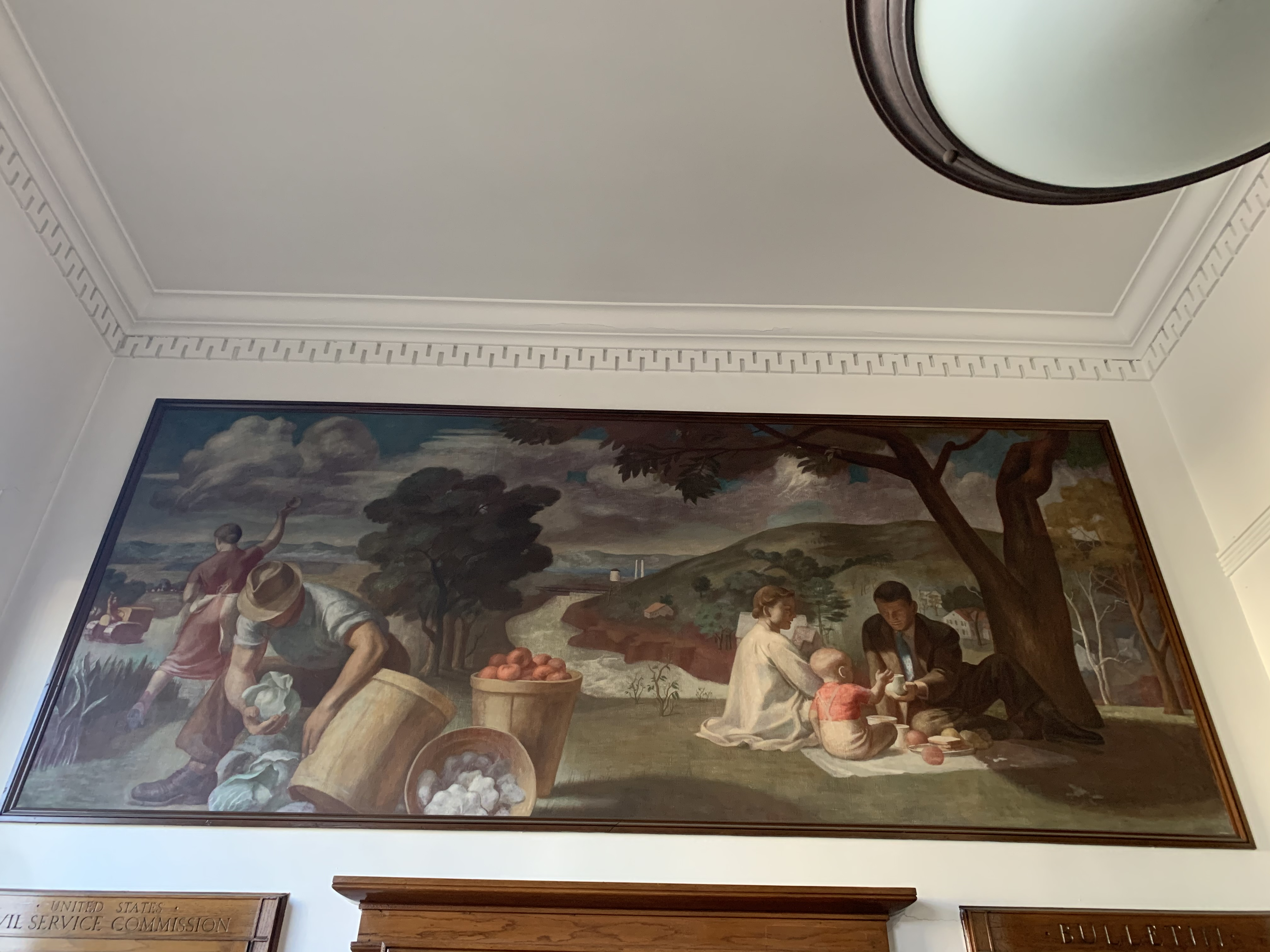
James Brooks "Labor and Leisure" (1938) in the former Little Falls, NJ Post Office

== Teaching positions ==
- 1947–1948: Columbia University, New York
- 1948–1955: Pratt Institute
- 1955–1960: Yale University, New Haven, Connecticut
- 1963: Artist-in-residence at the American Academy, Rome, Italy
- 1965–1967: New College, Sarasota, Florida
- 1966: Miami Beach Art Center, Miami Beach, Florida
- 1966–1969: Queens College, New York
- 1971–1972: University of Pennsylvania
- 1975: Cooper Union, New York City

== See also ==
- Abstract expressionism
- Abstract Imagists
- Lyrical abstraction
- Inscape (visual art)

== Books ==
- "James Brooks (1906–1992): Mounted Policeman (New York Policeman)". Mark Borghi Fine Art Inc. Archived from the original on April 4, 2005.

== Article ==
- Sandler, Irving H. "James Brooks and the abstract inscape", ARTnews (New York: Art Foundation, 1963) OCLC: 54034429
