= Tea (poem) =

Poem by Wallace Stevens

"Tea" is a poem from Wallace Stevens's first book of poetry, Harmonium. It was first published in 1915 in the journal Rogue.

Tea

When the elephant's-ear in the park
Shrivelled in frost,
And the leaves on the paths
Ran like rats,
Your lamp-light fell
On shining pillows,
Of sea-shades and sky-shades
Like umbrellas in Java.

== Interpretation ==
Eleanor Cook observes that "Tea" is one of two "seemingly (but far from) slight poems that close both editions of Harmonium," adding that this "eight-line, one-sentence, free-verse virtuoso performance" offers a very effective implicit leave-taking. (The other poem she is referring to is "To the Roaring Wind", quoted at the bottom of the main Harmonium essay.)

Cook compares "Tea" to Domination of Black, as being representative of "all the troping of leaves through the collection". She suggests that the reference to Java may be significant not only because it was a center of tea-trade, but also because its sophisticated court culture at one time, notable for its subtleties and appreciation of artists, "made it the kind of culture that Stevens especially liked". She also suggests that the poem expresses "Stevens's delicately implicit trope of drinking tea as a metaphor for reading (ingesting a drink from leaves)." She notes that Stevens was a tea-fancier.

Robert Buttel characterizes this poem as light, witty, and rococo, and as displaying compression, concentration, and precision. "The last four lines set the world of civilized order against the outdoor coldness," he writes, "ending on a note of exotic beauty, color, and elegance...." He suggests that the experience or feeling of being civilized is presented symbolically in "Tea". It is one of the two earliest Stevens poems to combine wit and elegance, according to Buttel, the other being "Cy est Pourtraicte, Madame Ste Ursule, et les Unze Mille Vierges", also published in 1915. The two poems are proofs that by 1915 Stevens had mastered the tools in the workshop of nineteenth-century poetry that he had set himself to learn, including imagism, impressionism, and symbolism.

As mentioned in the main Harmonium essay (see the section "The Mind of China"), the poem shows the influence of orientalism on Stevens's work.

== Media ==
Tea
Wallace Stevens's poem `Tea'
