= Judith Crist =

American film critic and professor

- Born: Judith Klein; May 22, 1922; New York City, U.S.
- Died: August 7, 2012 (aged 90); New York City, U.S.
- Education: Hunter College; Columbia University Graduate School of Journalism
- Occupations: Film critic, academic
- Years active: 1945–2012
- Spouse: William B. Crist (m. 1947; died 1993)
- Children: 1

Judith Crist (/krɪst/; née Klein; May 22, 1922 – August 7, 2012) was an American film critic and academic.

She appeared regularly on the Today show from 1964 to 1973 and was among the first full-time female critics for a major American newspaper, in her case, The New York Herald Tribune. She was the founding film critic at New York magazine and became known to most Americans as a critic at the weekly magazine TV Guide and at the morning TV show Today. She appeared in one film, Woody Allen's dramatic-comedy film Stardust Memories (1980), and was the author of various books, including The Private Eye, The Cowboy and the Very Naked Girl; Judith Crist's TV Guide to the Movies; and Take 22: Moviemakers on Moviemaking.

== Early life and education ==
Crist was born Judith Klein in The Bronx, New York City, the daughter of Jewish parents Helen (née Schoenberg), a librarian, and Solomon Klein, a manufacturing jeweler. She attended Morris High School in The Bronx, and received a Bachelor of Arts degree from Hunter College and a Master of Science degree from the Columbia University Graduate School of Journalism.

== Career ==
After graduating from Columbia in 1945, she was employed by The New York Herald Tribune as a reporter, film critic, and arts editor for 22 years, and she won a George Polk Award for her education coverage. After the Tribune ceased publication, she was named the first film critic at New York magazine. Upon her death, New York magazine film critic David Edelstein said, "Judith Crist helped set the stage for New York Magazine as a place for popular and yet essentially serious and wide-ranging film criticism. She was tart, sensible, and irresistibly readable, and she cut a colorful figure on the festival circuit, building bridges between filmmakers and audiences in her famous weekend seminars."

In addition, Crist worked as TV Guide's resident film critic (1966-1988) and as a critic-at-large for the Ladies Home Journal (1966-1967). Like Dwight Macdonald, she also worked on television as a critic for the Today show (1964-1973). She conducted the Judith Crist Film Weekends at Tarrytown House, in Tarrytown, New York, from 1971 to 2006.

In 1948, Crist took part in Dr. Fredric Wertham’s attack on comic books and published an article in Collier's magazine quoting Wertham and calling for action against violent, sadistic, and provocative comic books which Crist perceived to be affecting the morality of American youth.

In 1965, she wrote the article "Tribute to a Partnership", a tribute to Rodgers and Hammerstein, for a booklet that accompanied RCA Victor's original LP release of the soundtrack album of The Sound of Music. However, the article has not been reprinted for any of the CD releases of the soundtrack. In 1968, she published a collection of reviews entitled The Private Eye, the Cowboy, and the Very Naked Girl: Movies from Cleo to Clyde.

She was an adjunct professor at Columbia's School of Journalism for over 50 years (1958-2012). There, she taught a course called "Personal and Professional Style." Her students included film critics Kenneth Turan, David Denby of The New Yorker and New York Times critics Anna Kisselgoff and Margo Jefferson. In 1963, she was awarded an Alumni Award by the Journalism School Alumni Association.

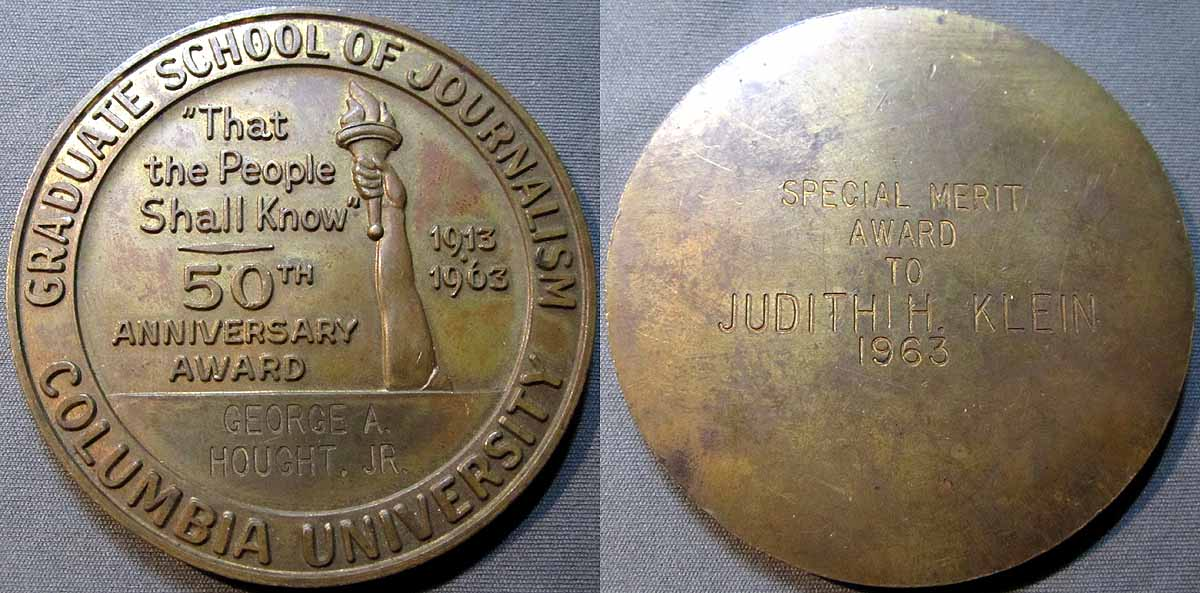
Crist's Alumni Award from the Journalism School Alumni Association of Columbia University

In April 5, 2008, the school presented her with its Founder's Award on her completion of 50 years as a faculty member. She taught until just before her death. She was a longtime member of the Executive Committee of the Columbia University Graduate School of Journalism Alumni Association and served three terms as President of the Alumni Association during the 1960s.

She cited Charlie Chaplin's The Gold Rush as her "first and to-this-day-most-vivid film experience."

== Personal life ==
Judith was married to William B. Crist from 1947 until his death in 1993. She was the mother of Steven Crist, a thoroughbred handicapper and publisher of the Daily Racing Form.

Crist died at her home in Manhattan on August 7, 2012, at age 90.

== Published works ==
- The Private Eye, the Cowboy, and the Very Naked Girl: Movies from Cleo to Clyde (1968)
- Judith Crist’s TV Guide to the Movies (1974)
- Take 22: Moviemakers on Moviemaking (1984)

== See also ==
- List of Columbia University people
- List of Hunter College people
- List of people from New York City
