= Frank Wimberley =

American artist (1926–2025)

- Born: August 31, 1926; Pleasantville, New Jersey, U.S.
- Died: October 9, 2025 (aged 99)
- Known for: Abstract art
- Movement: Modernism
- Spouse: Juanita Wimberley

Frank Wimberley (August 31, 1926 – October 9, 2025) was an American abstract expressionist artist.

== Background ==
Frank Wimberley was born on August 31, 1926, and grew up in suburban New Jersey. After serving in the US Army, he studied painting at Howard University with James Amos Porter, James Lesesne Wells, and Loïs Mailou Jones. While there he developed an interest in jazz, which led to friendships with Miles Davis, Ron Carter, and Wayne Shorter.

Wimberley was a longtime resident of Sag Harbor, New York. He and his wife, Juanita, moved there in the 1960s into a modernist house that they designed. In October 2020, T: The New York Times Style Magazine showcased the Wimberleys in their home in a feature on black families who settled in Sag Harbor in the 1930s and the decades after.

Wimberley died on October 9, 2025, at the age of 99.

== Work ==
Wimberley painted abstractly in acrylic paints, using a wide variety of tools including scrapers, spatulas, and brushes.

"Mr. Wimberley's canvases were entirely abstract, demanding to be taken for just what they are, pigment applied to cloth," wrote Helen A. Harrison for the New York Times in 1991. "Yet, in spite of the total lack of outside references, they conjure up a host of associations and implications."

Wimberley is represented by Berry Campbell Gallery in New York City.

== Critical reception ==
Writing about the artist's 1989 solo exhibition at the Fine Arts Center at the Southampton campus of Long Island University, New York Times critic Phyllis Braff wrote that Wimberley's "sweeping application of paint is the dominant action, serving as both theme and as principal generator of psychic energy." She credited the artist with a "forceful, imaginative and expressive use of color." Grace Glueck, writing for the paper in 2001 about Wimberley's exhibition at the June Kelly Gallery in New York City, said that Wimberley's "paintings are good to behold: beautifully brushed and infused with a light that magnifies their intensity."

Critic Philip Barcio said of the work in Wimberley's 2019 exhibition at Berry Campbell Gallery, "The textures and surface qualities Wimberley coaxes from his paints make some appear like mirrors, and others like caverns into which the light seems to disappear. Some of his surfaces feel stand-offish, almost wounded. Others are as welcoming as a hug."

== Selected museum collections ==
- David C. Driskell Center for the Study of Visual Arts and Culture of African Americans and the African Diaspora at the University of Maryland, College Park
- Islip Art Museum
- Saint Louis Art Museum
- Yale University Art Gallery
