= Michi Meko =

American artist (born 1974)

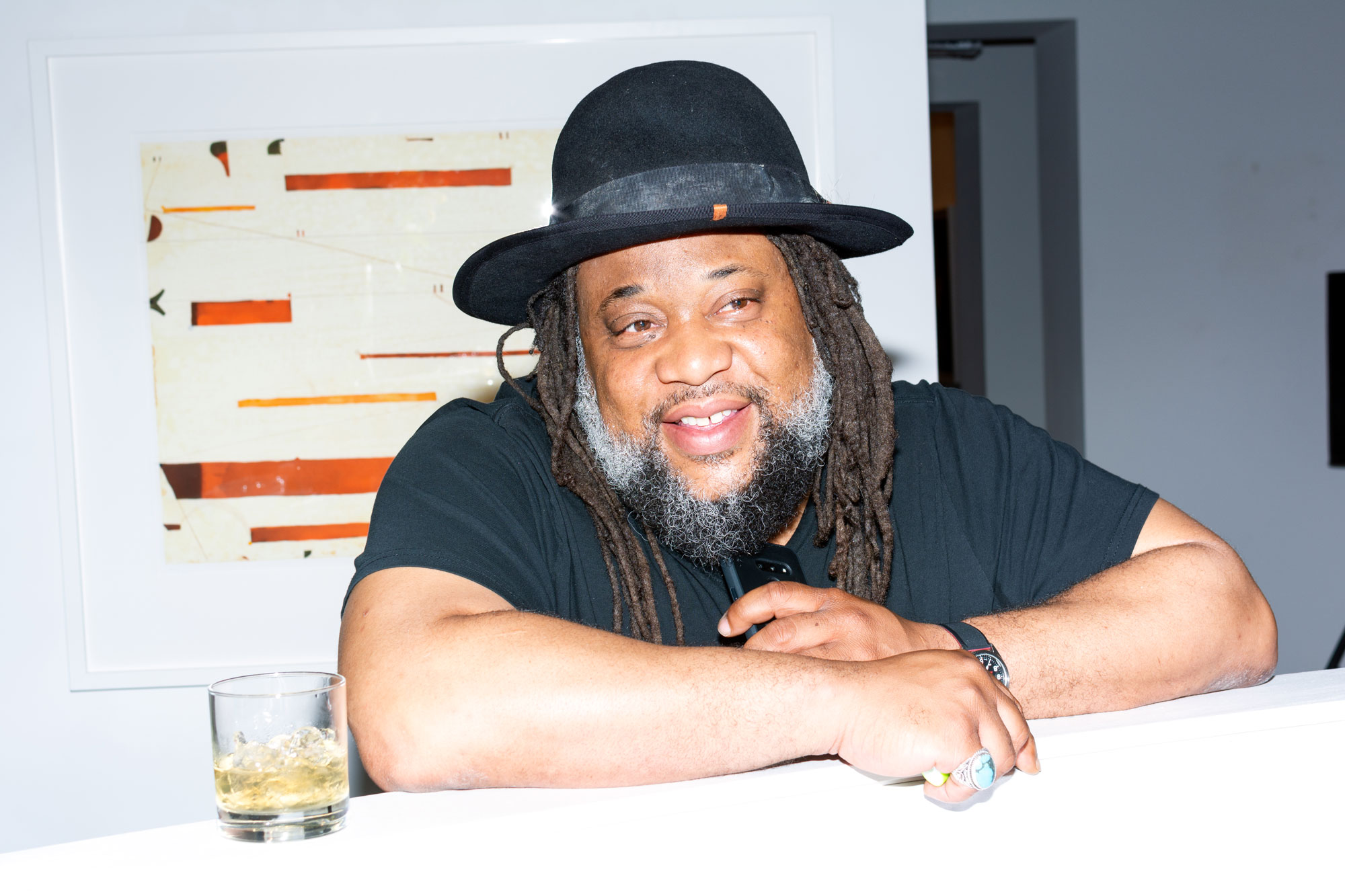
- Meko in 2019
- Born: 1974 (age 51–52)
- Education: Bachelor of Fine Arts, Painting
- Alma mater: University of North Alabama
- Known for: Painting and sculpture
- Awards: Atlanta Artadia Award, Joan Mitchell Foundation Grant
- Website: michimeko.com

Michi Meko (born 1974) is an American multidisciplinary artist based in Atlanta, Georgia. He is the recipient of the Joan Mitchell Foundation Grant and the Atlanta Artadia Award as well as a finalist for the 2019 Hudgens Prize. His work incorporates the visual language of naval flags and nautical wayfinding, combined with romanticized objects of the American South. Throughout his various platforms, his work engages contradictions and paradoxes that he uncovers through examining his personal history, African American folk traditions, and narratives that confront or circumvent established narratives.

In 2019, Meko was featured on Hulu streaming as an Artist in Residence.

== Grants and awards ==
- 2019: The Hudgens Prize, finalist
- 2018: Working Artist Project, Museum of Contemporary Art, Georgia
- 2017: Atlanta Artadia Award
- 2017: Joan Mitchell Foundation Grant
- 2015: DashBoard Co-Op Residency Grant
- 2013: Wonderroot CSA Grant
- 2013: Flux Projects Grant
- 2011: Studio Artist in Residence, Atlanta Contemporary
- 2010: BeltLine Atlanta Grant
- 2010: Idea Capital Grant
- 2008: Forward Arts Foundation, finalist
- 2005: Forward Arts Foundation, finalist

== Solo exhibitions ==
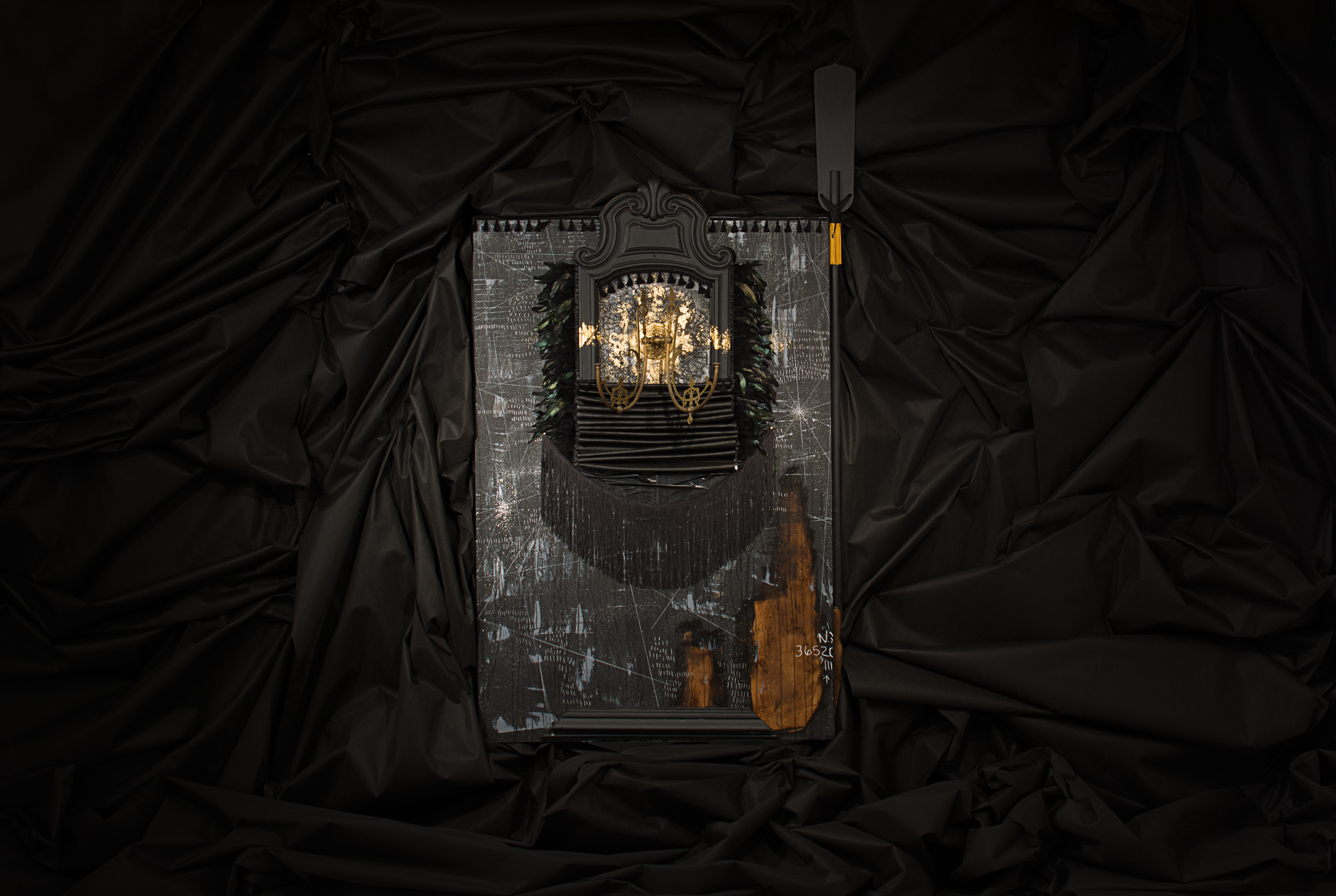
Installation by Michi Meko for his solo exhibition, "Out Here by Myself" at Alan Avery Art Company in Atlanta, Georgia.

- 2025: So Black and So Blue, SCAD Museum of Art, Savannah, Georgia
- 2023: The Burden of Wait (with Jodi Hays), Susan Inglett Gallery, New York
- 2022: Dark was the Night, Cold was the Ground, Kavi Gupta, Chicago, Illinois
- 2020: Black and Blur, Clark Atlanta University Art Museum, Atlanta, Georgia
- 2019: Out Here by Myself, Alan Avery Art Company, Atlanta, Ga
- 2019: When It's Black Outside, Chimento Contemporary, Los Angeles, Ca
- 2019: And Then There Was Sky, Sumter County Gallery of Art, Sumter, South Carolina
- 2018: It Doesn't Prepare You for Arrival, Museum of Contemporary Art, Georgia, Atlanta, Ga
- 2018: Like A Weird Sweet Spot, Westobou Gallery, Augusta, Ga
- 2017: One Last Smile Before the Undertow, Dodd Gallery, University of Georgia, Athens, Ga
- 2016: Circle of Rivers, University of North Georgia, Dahlonega, Ga
- 2015: Pursuit: Almost Drowned, Alan Avery Art Company, Atlanta, Ga
- 2010: Navigating this American Landscape, Archetype Gallery, Atlanta, Ga
- 2009: Fear Kills Pursuit: A Mighty Roar and the Magic Inside, Beep Beep Gallery, Atlanta, Ga
- 2008: Comfort Kills Pursuit: Fight!!!, EyeDrum, Atlanta, Ga

== Group exhibitions ==
- 2022: The Dirty South: Contemporary Art, Material Culture, and the Sonic Impulse, Crystal Bridges Museum, Bentonville, Arkansas
- 2021: Realms of Refuge, Kavi Gupta, Chicago, Illinois
- 2021: The Dirty South: Contemporary Art, Material Culture, and the Sonic Impulse, Virginia Museum of Fine Arts, Richmond, Virginia

== Collections ==
- High Museum of Art
- Museum of Contemporary Art, Georgia
- Virginia Museum of Fine Arts
