= Hemlock (painting) =

1956 painting by Joan Mitchell

Hemlock is a 1956 oil on canvas painting by the American New York School abstract expressionist artist Joan Mitchell. On this canvas Mitchell mixed horizontal strokes of green with white. The work is in the collection of the Whitney Museum of American Art, in New York.

The painting was named by Mitchell after it was completed for what she termed the "dark and blue feeling" of Wallace Stevens 1916 poem Domination of Black and has several mentions and references to Hemlock and hemlocks. Hemlock, which appeared in the April 21, 1958 edition of Time (page 71), is described as a work that is recognizable by its name but not without it.
