= Cy Est Pourtraicte, Madame Ste Ursule, et Les Unze Mille Vierges =

Poem by Wallace Stevens

"Cy est Pourtraicte, Madame Ste Ursule, et les Unze Mille Vierges" is a poem in Wallace Stevens's first book of poetry, Harmonium. It was first published in 1915 in the magazine Rogue, so it is in the public domain. Butell characterizes it as one of the first two poems (the other is "Tea") to "successfully combine wit and elegance". They are the earliest poems to be collected later in Harmonium.

Cy est Pourtraicte, Madame Ste Ursule, et les Unze Mille Vierges

Ursula, in a garden, found
A bed of radishes.
She kneeled upon the ground
And gathered them,
With flowers around,
Blue, gold, pink, and green.

She dressed in red and gold brocade
And in the grass an offering made
Of radishes and flowers.

She said, "My dear,
Upon your altars,
I have placed
The marguerite and coquelicot,
And roses
Frail as April snow;
But here," she said,
"Where none can see,
I make an offering, in the grass,
Of radishes and flowers."
And then she wept
For fear the Lord would not accept.
The good Lord in His garden sought
New leaf and shadowy tinct,
And they were all His thought.
He heard her low accord,
Half prayer and half ditty,
And He felt a subtle quiver,
That was not heavenly love,
Or pity.

This is not writ
In any book.

== Interpretation ==
The poem describes a woman and her prayer ceremony in a garden, and the Lord's religiously unorthodox response. If the "true subject" of the poem is an erotic moment, the "poetry of the subject" is a delicate poetic bouquet.(For more on this distinction see "Le Monocle de Mon Oncle".) Or one might follow Joan Richardson in viewing it as a record of Stevens's relationship with his wife, Elsie, disguised as a mock-medieval legend to "throw anyone who might be curious completely off the scent." Elsie did not like the poem's "mocking spirit", and one editor, Harriet Monroe, wrote a rejection letter to Stevens in 1915 that characterizes this and other submitted poems as "recondite, erudite, provocatively obscure, with a kind of modern-gargoyle grin to them --- Aubrey-Beardsleyish in the making." She advised him to "chase his mystically mirthful and mournful muse out of the nether darkness."

Bates speculates that the poem's title comes from a fifteenth-century French translation of the Legenda Aurea. It would have identified a simple woodcut of the martyrdom of Saint Ursula and her eleven thousand followers at the hands of the Huns. He sees the poem as lifting the veil which obscures "the subliminal side of religious piety."
