= Joan Mitchell =

American artist (1925–1992)

- Mitchell in 1983
- Born: February 12, 1925; Chicago, Illinois, U.S.
- Died: October 30, 1992 (aged 67); American Hospital of Paris; Neuilly-sur-Seine, France
- Education: Smith College; School of the Art Institute of Chicago (BFA, MFA); Columbia University
- Known for: Painting; Printmaking; Pastel; Works on paper
- Movement: Abstract expressionism; New York School

Joan Mitchell (February 12, 1925 – October 30, 1992) was an American artist who worked primarily in painting and printmaking, and also used pastel and made other works on paper. She was an active participant in the New York School of artists in the 1950s. A native of Chicago, she is associated with the American abstract expressionist movement, even though she lived in France for much of her career.

Mitchell's emotionally intense style and its gestural brushwork were influenced by nineteenth-century post-impressionist painters, particularly Henri Matisse. Memories of landscapes inspired her compositions; she famously told art critic Irving Sandler, "I carry my landscapes around with me." Her later work was informed and constrained by her declining health.

Mitchell was one of her era's few female painters to gain critical and public acclaim. Her paintings, drawings, and editioned prints can be seen in major museums and collections around the world, and have sold for record-breaking prices. In 2021, the San Francisco Museum of Modern Art and Baltimore Museum of Art co-organized a comprehensive retrospective of her work. The Fondation Louis Vuitton presented an exhibition of the work of Mitchell and Claude Monet from October 2022 to February 2023.

In her will, Mitchell provided for the creation of the Joan Mitchell Foundation, a non-profit corporation that awards grants and fellowships to working artists and maintains her archives.

== Family ==
Mitchell's family roots trace back to the Revolutionary War. The dust jacket front inside flap of Joan Mitchell Lady Painter: A Life describes Mitchell as an heiress. Her mother, Marion Strobel is described as an heiress, while her father, Dr. James Herbert Mitchell was an "unpedigreed son of a downstate farmer". They married on December 6, 1922, on North Michigan Avenue.

In 1857, Sarah Moore and Daniel Baxter, Marion's maternal grandparents, left "well-established" Quincy, Massachusetts families to settle on Ohio Street in Chicago. By 1871, Daniel Baxter had accumulated $100,000 ($2.7 million in 2025) in the grain business. Joan's grandmother, Henrietta Baxter, was the eldest of their five children. In 1890, Henrietta married Cincinnati-bred Charles Louis Strobel. Strobel was the son of pocketbook factory owner and immigrant, Karl Strobel, and a descendant of Bavarian porcelain merchants. A trained civil engineer, Charles worked for 27 years at Andrew Carnegie's Keystone Bridge Company.

James Herbert Mitchell is from Havana, Illinois where his maternal grandparents, George and Waity Vaugahan had moved to from Vermont in 1839. With a 177 acres (0.277 sq mi) land grant signed by President James Polk they built a farmhouse and raised corn, wheat, horses, sheep and dairy cows. Their ancestors had been British colonists and tannery operators. Joan was known to make claims that her paternal great-grandfather was an American Revolution combatant. These claims were not confirmed. Sarah Felicia Vaughan married a Mr. James Hickman Herndon Mitchell in 1873, having outsurvived both of her brothers and mother. Her sickly father passed in 1874. Mitchell was the youngest of 11 children born to Isaac Mitchell and Frances Stribling Mitchell who had left Virginia to homestead in Kentucky and then along the Illinois River. Her half great-uncle (Jim H. H. Mitchell's half brother), Henry Harrison Mitchell, was the first casualty of his county in the American Civil War.

== Early life and education ==
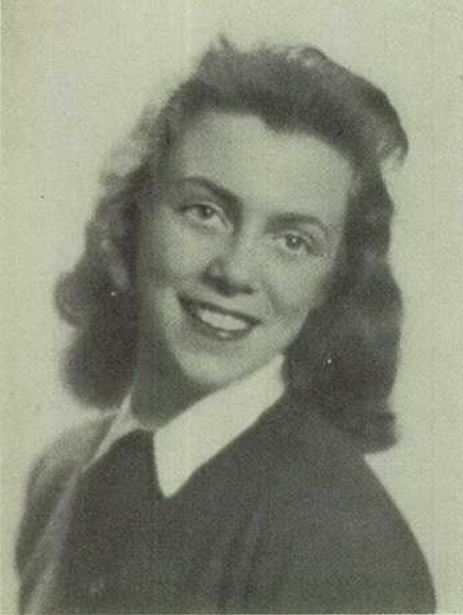
Joan Mitchell, ca. 1942, Francis W. Parker School yearbook

Mitchell was born in Chicago, Illinois, the daughter of dermatologist James Herbert Mitchell and poet Marion Strobel Mitchell. Her father served as president of the American Dermatological Association, her mother served as co-editor of Poetry. She enjoyed diving and skating growing up, and her art would later reflect this athleticism; one gallery owner commented that Mitchell "approached painting almost like a competitive sport". Mitchell frequently attended Saturday art classes at the Art Institute of Chicago, and eventually would spend her summers of later adolescence in an Institute-run art colony, Ox-Bow. She lived on Chestnut Street in the Streeterville neighborhood and attended high school at Francis W. Parker School in the Lincoln Park neighborhood. She was close to her Parker classmate Edward Gorey and remained friends with him in later years, although neither cared for the other's work. When her maternal grandfather, Charles Louis Strobel, died in April 1936, her inheritance was two-thirds of his $500,000 ($11.6 million in 2025), and she would later inherit trusts from both parents.

Mitchell studied at Smith College in Massachusetts for two years but wanted be a full-time painter. She then attended the School of the Art Institute of Chicago (SAIC), where she earned her BFA in 1947 and her MFA in 1950. She earned a SAIC scholarship in 1944. She painted during her summers in Mexico. After moving to Manhattan in 1947, she wanted to study at Hans Hofmann's school in New York City but, according to curator Jane Livingston, Mitchell attended only one class and declared, "I couldn't understand a word he said so I left, terrified." A $2,000 ($27063 in 2025) travel fellowship allowed her to study in Paris and Provence in 1948–49, and she also traveled in Spain and Italy. During this period, her work became increasingly abstract.

Mitchell married American publisher Barney Rosset in September 1949 in Le Lavandou, France. The couple returned to New York City later that year. Rosset founded Grove Press. They would divorce in 1952.

== Early career (New York) ==
In 1950, Mitchell saw her first Willem de Kooning painting at the Whitney Annual. That year, Mitchell painted what would be her last picture with a human figure incorporated in the work Figure and the City, of which she said later "I knew that it would be my last figure". Then throughout the 1950s, Mitchell was active in the New York School of artists and poets, and was associated with the American Abstract expressionist movement, although she personally abhorred aesthetic labels. Beginning in 1950, she maintained a studio in Greenwich Village, first on Eleventh Street and later on Ninth Street. She would maintain a New York City apartment until 1982, despite being based in France starting in the late 1950s. She was a regular at established artist gathering spots like the Cedar Tavern and The Club, an invitation-only loft space on Eighth Street where Mitchell participated in panel discussions and attended social gatherings throughout the 1950s.

Mitchell maintained a robust creative discourse with fellow New York School painters Philip Guston, Franz Kline, and Willem de Kooning, whose work she greatly admired. As Katy Siegel wrote in Joan Mitchell, "She went to their studios and shows, and they came to hers; she had dinner and drinks with them, in company and alone, talking painting materials and great art." Along with Lee Krasner, Grace Hartigan, Helen Frankenthaler, Shirley Jaffe, Elaine de Kooning, and Sonia Gechtoff, Mitchell was one of the few female artists in her era to gain critical acclaim and recognition.

In 1951, Mitchell's work was exhibited in the landmark "Ninth Street Show", organized by art dealer Leo Castelli and by members of the Artists' Club; the show also included work by Jackson Pollock, Willem de Kooning, and Hans Hofmann. Joan Mitchell carried her large abstract painting across town with the help of Castelli. Her friends Kline and de Kooning thought her work was excellent and put the painting in good place in the exhibition. Her first solo exhibition was held at the New Gallery in New York in 1952.

By the mid-1950s Mitchell was spending increasing amounts of time traveling and working in France. She continued to exhibit regularly in New York, with numerous solo exhibitions at the Stable Gallery throughout the 1950s–1960s. In an interview with Linda Nochlin, Mitchell admitted that though many of her colleagues were very supportive of her artistic career, because she was a woman in the art field she did have a few setbacks. She said that she was once told by Hans Hofmann that she should be painting, which sounds very nice, but she took it to mean that the male artists were not threatened by female artists so much that they did not care if they advanced their artistic career.

In 1955, while in Paris, Mitchell met Canadian painter Jean-Paul Riopelle, with whom she would have a long, rich, and tumultuous relationship (from 1955 to 1979). They maintained separate homes and studios, but had dinner and drank together nearly daily. In the same year, Mitchell met the author Samuel Beckett for the first time. Their relationship was both personal and intellectual. Critic Lucy Jeffery writes about their mutual influence and interest in Paul Cézanne, explaining that 'Mitchell and Beckett share a style that, like the pendulum, swings between dynamism and hesitancy, limpidity and obscurity, and, in so doing, obscures meaning to resist reductive pigeonholing. In [Beckett's short text] 'One Evening' and [Mitchell's painting] Tondo they created self-reflexive fragments that make us, as wayfarers of the text/canvas, traverse '[i]n unending ending or beginning light' (Beckett, 2009, 126).'

In 1956 Mitchell painted one of her breakthrough works, Hemlock, named by the artist after it was completed for what she called the "dark and blue feeling" of Wallace Stevens' 1916 poem Domination of Black.

In October 1957, the first major feature on Mitchell's work appeared in ARTnews. In the article, entitled "Mitchell Paints a Picture", art critic Irving Sandler wrote, "Those feelings which she strives to express she defines as 'the qualities which differentiate a line of poetry from a line of prose.' However, emotion must have an outside reference, and nature furnishes the external substance in her work." By the end of the 1950s, Mitchell was included among "the Vocal Girls" in Time.

== Mid-career (France) ==
By 1959, Mitchell was living full-time in France and painting in a studio on the rue Fremicourt in the 15th arrondissement of Paris. Mitchell kept this rental for most of the 1960s. She was enticed to Paris by her lover Riopelle. During this time, her paintings appeared in a string of high-profile international exhibitions, including the Osaka exhibition International Art of a New Era: Informel and Gutai; the 29th Venice Biennale; the V Bienal do Museo de Arte Moderna, São Paulo; and Documenta II in Kassel. Along with regular solo exhibitions at the Stable Gallery and group exhibitions at other venues in New York, she began exhibiting in Paris with Galerie Jean Fournier (known as Galerie Kléber until 1963). Fournier would remain Mitchell's Paris dealer for more than three decades.

Also in the early 1960s, Mitchell had solo exhibitions in Paris with Galerie Neufville (1960) and Galerie Lawrence (1962). She had additional solo exhibitions in Italy (Galleria Dell'Ariete, Milan, 1960) and Switzerland (Klipstein und Kornfeld, Bern, 1962). Throughout the 1960s, Mitchell's work was included in the Salon de Mai and the Salon des Réalités Nouvelles in Paris, as well as numerous group exhibitions held at France, Germany, Italy, Switzerland, Japan, The Netherlands, and other international venues.

During the period between 1960 and 1964, Mitchell moved away from the all-over style and bright colors of her earlier compositions, instead using sombre hues and dense central masses of color to express something inchoate and primordial. The marks on these works were said to be extraordinary: "The paint flung and squeezed on to the canvases, spilling and spluttering across their surfaces and smeared on with the artist's fingers." The artist herself referred to the work created in this period of the early 1960s as "very violent and angry," but by 1964 she was "trying to get out of a violent phase and into something else." For a time, Mitchell rivaled de Kooning as the greatest living abstract painter. By this time leading abstract expressionist at her level such as Kline and Pollock were dead and de Kooning had reverted to figurative work, making room for her to make these radical stylistic shifts in her abstract expressionism.

In 1967, Mitchell inherited enough money following the death of her mother to purchase a two-acre estate in the town of Vétheuil, France, near Giverny, the gardener's cottage of which had been Claude Monet's home. Mitchell bought the house "so she wouldn't have to dogwalk" and that came in useful for her 13 dogs. Situated 35 miles (56.3 km) outside of Paris, she lived and worked there for the remainder of her life. The landscape in Vétheuil, particularly the view of the Seine and the gardens on her property, became frequent reference points for her work. Yet, near her death she spoke as if she acquired the property without regard to the prior owner and as if she did not even know how to pronounce his name, rhyming it with bonnet. Mitchell often invited artist friends from New York to come on creative retreats to Vétheuil. Painter Joyce Pensato recalled, "She wanted to give to young people. Carl [Plansky] and I called it the Fresh Air Fund...The first time she invited me for the summer, it ended up being March to September. I got brainwashed for six months, and that's how I found out who I am."

In 1968, Mitchell became the first artist to have abstract expressionism work in the Smart Museum of Art collection in her home town when Untitled (1961) by Mitchell became one of the first donations to the museum. That year, Mitchell began exhibiting with Martha Jackson Gallery in New York; she continued to exhibit with the gallery into the 1970s. In 1972, Mitchell staged her first major museum exhibition, entitled My Five Years in the Country, at the Everson Museum of Art in Syracuse, New York. The exhibition, especially Mitchell's "Sunflower" paintings from the late 1960s-early 1970s, received critical acclaim. Writing for The New York Times, Peter Schjeldahl predicted that Mitchell would ultimately be recognized "as one of the best American painters not only of the fifties, but of the sixties and seventies as well." He continued, "This claim will not, I think, seem large to anyone lucky enough to have viewed the recent massive and almost awesomely beautiful Mitchell exhibition—49 paintings, some of them huge, done during the five years the artist has been living in France—at the Everson Museum in Syracuse." The exhibition traveled to Martha Jackson Gallery following the Everson Museum presentation.

In 1969 Mitchell completed her first large scale triptych, the 16.5 foot wide Sans Neige (without Snow).

Being based in France, Mitchell was not caught up on the New York art shift to pop art, minimalism and conceptualism. Mitchell's had her first museum exhibition at the Everson Museum of Art in 1972. In 1976, Mitchell began exhibiting regularly with New York gallerist Xavier Fourcade, who was her New York dealer until his death in 1987.

In 1979 Mitchell completed two of her [what went on to be] best known large scale works, the polyptychs La Vie en Rose (named after the famed song by the French chanteuse Edith Piaf) and Salut Tom (dedicated to her friend the art critic and curator Thomas B. Hess who died in 1978). Tausif Noor in writing for the New York Times says of La Vie en Rose [that in it] ... "Mitchell juxtaposes energetic — nearly violent — sections of black and blue brush strokes against a haze of lavender and pale pink, warping the viewer's sense of the painting's scale and directing the eye"....

== Later years and death (France) ==
In 1982, Mitchell became the first female American artist to have a solo exhibition at the Musee d'art moderne de la Ville de Paris. In Paris, Mitchell had a circle of artist friends, such as the composer Gisèle Barreau and painters such as Kate Van Houten, Claude Bauret Allard, Michaële-Andréa Schatt, Monique Frydman, Mâkhi Xenakis, Shirley Jaffe, Zuka, and Katy Crowe. In November 1984, Mitchell commenced sessions with Parisian psychoanalyst Christiane Rousseaux-Mosettig in the Bastille area. There she met and became friends with the American artist Sara Holt and her husband, artist Jean-Max Albert. She wrote: "Kids… I really love your plural work and natch both of you. So nice liking the work and the artist too — it's rather rare I have found… I'm very very happy… ".

In 1984, Mitchell was diagnosed with advanced oral cancer and a mandibulectomy (removal of the jaw) was advised. In October, she obtained a second opinion from Jean-Pierre Bataini, a pioneer in radiation oncology with the Curie Institute, whose therapy was successful, but left Mitchell with a dead jawbone (osteonecrosis), along with anxiety and depression. She had quit smoking on doctor's orders, but remained a heavy drinker.

After 1985, Mitchell's post-cancer paintings reflect the psychological changes cancer had effected: six Between paintings, Faded Air I, Faded Air II, the A Few Days cycle, the Before, Again cycle and the Then, Last Time group of four. Her health further deteriorated when Mitchell developed osteoarthritis as a result of hip dysplasia. She underwent hip replacement surgery at Hôpital Cochin in December 1985, but with little success. During her subsequent recuperation at a clinic in Louveciennes, she started watercolor painting. Her postoperative difficulties necessitated using an easel and working on a smaller format. Her River cycle is emblematic of this period.

Around the same time, Mitchell's New York dealer, Xavier Fourcade, had been diagnosed with AIDS and, in 1986, travelled to France to undergo treatment. Fourcade and Mitchell visited Lille in December to view an exhibition of works by Matisse from the State Hermitage Museum, Leningrad. The trip resulted in the Lille cycle of paintings, followed, after Xavier Fourcade's death on April 28, 1987, by the Chord paintings. The River, Lille and Chord paintings were exhibited at Galerie Jean Fournier, Paris between June 10 and July 13, 1987.

In 1988, Mitchell's work was showcased in a major retrospective exhibition, which she referred to as being "art-historized live." Entitled The Paintings of Joan Mitchell: Thirty-six Years of Natural Expressionism, the exhibition toured the United States in 1988 and 1989, originating at the Corcoran Gallery of Art before traveling to San Francisco Museum of Art, Albright-Knox Art Gallery, La Jolla Museum of Contemporary Art, and Herbert F. Johnson Museum of Art at Cornell University.

Mitchell's first solo show at Robert Miller Gallery (of nine paintings) ran from October 25 to November 25, 1989. Her second Robert Miller Gallery solo ran from March 26 to April 20, 1991. It proved to be very popular, and featured paintings described by John Russell of The New York Times as "self-portraits by someone who has staked everything on autonomous marks that are peculiar to herself".

In the final years of her life, Mitchell returned to the subject of sunflowers with renewed focus. Sunflowers, 1990–91 was painted to "convey the feeling of a dying sunflower".

In October 1992, Mitchell flew to New York for a Matisse exhibition at the Museum of Modern Art. Upon her arrival, she was taken to a doctor, who diagnosed advanced lung cancer. She returned to Paris on October 22, returning to Vétheuil briefly before entering hospital in Paris, where friends like John Cheim and Joseph Strick visited her. She died on the morning of October 30, 1992, at the American Hospital of Paris.

== Style and influences ==
Although her painting style evolved over the years, Mitchell remained committed to abstraction from the early 1950s until her final works in 1992. Grounded in years of visiting the Art Institute of Chicago as a child to look at nineteenth-century painting, Mitchell cited Paul Cézanne, Wassily Kandinsky, Henri Matisse, and Vincent van Gogh as influences on her work, and once said, "If I could paint like Matisse, I'd be in heaven." Her paintings are expansive, often covering multiple panels. Memories and the feelings she associated with remembered landscapes provided the primary source material for her work. Mitchell told critic Irving Sandler, "I carry my landscapes around with me."

Mitchell painted primarily with oil paints on primed canvas or white ground, using gestural, sometimes violent brushwork. She has described a painting as "an organism that turns in space."

According to art historian Linda Nochlin, the "meaning and emotional intensity [of Mitchell's pictures] are produced structurally, as it were, by a whole series of oppositions: dense versus transparent strokes; gridded structure versus more chaotic, ad hoc construction; weight on the bottom of the canvas versus weight at the top; light versus dark; choppy versus continuous strokes; harmonious and clashing juxtapositions of hue – all are potent signs of meaning and feeling."

Mitchell said that she wanted her paintings "to convey the feeling of the dying sunflower" and "some of them come out like young girls, very coy ... they're very human." Mitchell was very influenced by her feelings and incorporated them into her artwork. She even compared these feelings that influenced her paintings to poetry.

== Legacy ==
=== Joan Mitchell Foundation ===
In her will, Mitchell provided for the creation of a foundation that would "aid and assist" artists while stewarding her legacy. Established in New York in 1993 as a not-for-profit corporation, the Joan Mitchell Foundation awards grants and fellowships to U.S.-based painters, sculptors, and artist collectives. More than 1,000 U.S.-based artists have received grants from the Foundation, including Mel Chin (1995), Amy Sillman (1999), Franco Mondini-Ruiz (2001), Mark Bradford (2002), Wangechi Mutu (2007), Simone Leigh (2011), Amy Sherald (2013), Amanda Ross-Ho (2013), Ann Purcell (2014), Michi Meko (2017), Elisabeth Condon (2018), Daniel Lind-Ramos (2019), Zarouhie Abdalian (2020), and Liza Sylvestre (2021). The Foundation provides artists with free resources and instruction in the areas of career documentation, inventory management, and legacy planning. At the time of her 100th birthday, her foundation (along with her contemporary Robert Rauschenberg's) was regarded as one of the largest and most influential visual arts foundations.

An Artist-in-Residence program at the Joan Mitchell Center in New Orleans, Louisiana opened in 2015 at 2275 Bayou Road in the Seventh Ward. The Joan Mitchell Center in New Orleans offers artists time and space for the creative process through 6 or 14 week residencies. Artists have opportunities to engage with arts professionals, partner arts organizations, and others in the community. Applicants must either be based in New Orleans for the last 5 years, native to New Orleans, or a former grant recipient of the Joan Mitchell Foundation. Past residency participants include Laylah Ali, Firelei Báez, Heather Hart, Maren Hassinger, Laura Kina, Carrie Moyer, Shani Peters, Alison Saar, Amy Sherald, Cullen Washington, Jr., Carl Joe Williams, and Mel Ziegler.

In addition, the Foundation manages a collection of Mitchell's artwork, her papers (including correspondence and photographs), and other archival materials related to her life and work. In 2015, the Foundation established the Joan Mitchell Catalogue Raisonné project, which is researching Mitchell's paintings for the eventual publication of a catalogue raisonné.

=== Select legacy exhibitions ===
Mitchell's work was featured in mid-career surveys in 1961 and 1974, and a major late-career retrospective toured in 1988 and 1989. A retrospective survey, The Paintings of Joan Mitchell, opened at the Whitney Museum of American Art in 2002. On the eve of the exhibition's opening, friend and art writer Klaus Kertess wrote in the New York Times: "A passionate inner vision guided Joan's brush. Like her peer Cy Twombly, she extended the vocabulary of her Abstract Expressionist forebears. She imbued their painterliness with a compositional and chromatic bravery that defiantly alarms us into grasping their beauty."

In 2016 her work was included in the exhibition Women of Abstract Expressionism organized by the Denver Art Museum. In 2015, Kunsthaus Bregenz, Austria, organized Joan Mitchell Retrospective: Her Life and Paintings, which traveled to Museum Ludwig, Cologne, Germany (2015–2016).

Mitchell's work was included in the 2021 exhibition Women in Abstraction at the Centre Pompidou.

In September 2021, a comprehensive retrospective, Joan Mitchell, opened at San Francisco Museum of Modern Art (September 4, 2021 – January 17, 2022). The retrospective was co-curated by Sarah Roberts, SFMOMA, and Katy Siegel, Baltimore Museum of Art. In a review for The New York Times, critic Tausif Noor wrote that the exhibition "tracks how Mitchell's steely resolve to be written in history as one of the greatest painters produced a signature style that extended the contours of Abstract Expressionism." Following the run at SFMOMA, the show traveled to the Baltimore Museum of Art (March 6 – August 14, 2022) and the Fondation Louis Vuitton, Paris (Fall 2022). In 2023 her work was included in the exhibition Action, Gesture, Paint: Women Artists and Global Abstraction 1940-1970 at the Whitechapel Gallery in London.

From March 25 – June 25, 2023, the Saint Louis Art Museum exhibited Monet/Mitchell: Painting the French Landscape. The exhibit examined Mitchell and Claude Monet's works of the French landscape. The exhibit was also shown at the Fondation Louis Vuitton, Paris from October 5, 2022 – February 27, 2023. The exhibition catalog was by Simon Kelly, with contributions from Suzanne Pagé and Marianne Mathieu ISBN 978-3-777-44092-7

Mitchell's art is held in the permanent collection of over 100 public institutions worldwide.

== Art market ==
Untitled (1960) sold at auction for $11.9 million in 2014, a then record for a work by a female artist.

Mitchell's artwork has been extremely commercially successful, both during her lifetime and after her death. Mitchell earned over $30,000 in art sales between 1960 and 1962, while still in the middle of her career. This was a significant figure for a woman painter at that time.

At the time of her death in 1992, Mitchell was represented by Robert Miller Gallery in New York and Galerie Jean Fournier in Paris. Both galleries continued to present exhibitions of her work throughout the 1990s. In 2004, Cheim & Read in New York assumed gallery representation for the Joan Mitchell Foundation; the gallery presented numerous solo exhibitions of Mitchell's work until 2018, when the Foundation shifted representation to David Zwirner. In 2019, Mitchell's multi-panel works were the subject of a solo exhibition at David Zwirner New York, entitled Joan Mitchell: I carry my landscapes around with me.

=== Auctions/Art fairs ===
In 2007, the Art Institute of Chicago sold Ste. Hilaire, 1957 at Christie's New York for $3.8 million. In 2012, an untitled 1971 painting of Mitchell's sold for €5.2 million ($7 million) at Christie's Paris. That year, Mitchell's canvases were the two most expensive works by any woman artist sold at auction, according to auction database Artnet. Works by Mitchell fetched $239.8 million in sales from 1985 through 2013, according to figures compiled by Bloomberg.

At Christie's New York in 2014, Mitchell's untitled 1960 abstract painting sold for $11.9 million, surpassing the high estimate and setting an auction record for the artist. The result also established a new record for an artwork by any female artist at auction, formerly held by Berthe Morisot's Apres le dejeuner (1881). This price in turn was exceeded by the $44.4 million achieved by the 1932 painting Jimson Weed/White Flower No 1 by Georgia O'Keeffe on November 20, 2014. In June 2018, nine of Mitchell's paintings were expected to sell for more than $70 million at the world's largest modern art fair, Art Basel. Five of her works sold for a total of $49 million, including Composition (1969) and Untitled (1959), which sold for $14 million each. In May 2021, Mitchell's painting 12 Hawks at 3 O'Clock (ca. 1962) sold for a record $20 million at Art Basel Hong Kong.

In 2023, Untitled (c. 1959) sold at Christie's for $29.16 million on November 9 and Sunflowers (1990–91) sold at Sotheby's for $27.9 million on November 16, marking the first two works from the artist to gavel at over $20 million. The previous record for a Mitchell work at auction had been when Blueberry (1969) sold for $16.9 million in 2018 at Christie's New York. Mitchell had gifted Sunflower to John Cheim in 1991 after its completion. In May 2024, Noon (c. 1969) exceeded its $15–$20 million estimate by realizing an auction result of $22.6 million at Sotheby's. In June 2024, a work titled Sunflowers (1990–91) sold at Art Basel in the $18–$20 million range, but this was not the 2023 Sotheby sale work. City Landscape was estimated to sell in the $15 million to $20 million range and eventually sold for $17,085,000 at Christies on November 19, 2024. In March 2026, Mitchell became the highest priced female artist to have a work sold at auction in Asia when her La Grande Vallée VII (1983), which had previously sold for $14.5 million at Christie’s in New York in 2020, sold for a hammer price of $14.7 million and $17.6 million with fees at Sotheby's Hong Kong.

== Other ==
In 2025 the American businessman and philanthropist Jorge M. Perez and his wife Darlene donated Mitchell's monumental 1973 triptych Iva to the Tate Modern in London.
