= Thomas B. Hess =

Thomas B. Hess (1920, Rye, New York – July 13, 1978) was an American art editor and curator, perhaps best known for his over twenty years at the helm of ARTnews and his championing, mounting exhibitions of the works of, and writing on the artists Willem de Kooning and Barnett Newman.

== Biography ==
Thomas Baer Hess was born in suburban Rye in Westchester County, New York, the son of New York City lawyer Gabriel Lorie Hess and his wife, Helen Baer Hess. He was then sent for his initial formal education to a boarding school in Switzerland. He then went on to do his undergraduate studies in French Art and Literature at Yale University, from which he graduated magna cum laude in 1942.

Immediately following college, Hess worked at the Museum of Modern Art under Alfred Barr and Dorothy Miller. Soon thereafter Hess enlisted in the United States Air Force during World War II and became a fighter pilot. in 1944 having returned from his war service Hess went to work at ARTnews under Alfred Frankfurter and in 1949 was named executive editor of the publication. He remained at the magazine in this editorial capacity until the periodical changed hands in 1972. In 1953 while at the magazine he penned the pivotal article "De Kooning Paints a Picture" which was instrumental in accelerating the international renown of the aforementioned transplanted Dutch artist

Hess was the author of multiple books, including Barnett Newman and Willem de Kooning. He also co-edited the volumes Art and Sexual Politics (with Elizabeth C. Baker) and Woman as Sex Object. Studies in Erotic Art 1730-1970 (with Linda Nochlin).

In the final year of his life, Hess was appointed by the director of the Metropolitan Museum of Art, Philippe de Montebello to replace Henry Geldzahler as the chief curator of 20th century art at the museum. However, on July 13 of that year Hess died of a heart attack one day short of what would have been his 58th birthday.

In 1979 Hess's friend the painter Joan Mitchell created a large scale quadtych Salut Tom to mark his passing.

== Personal life ==
Hess was known to have had an affair with Elaine de Kooning, the abstract expressionist painter and wife of Willem de Kooning.

== Selected works ==
- Abstract Painting: Background and American Phase. Viking Press, New York 1951
- Willem de Kooning. G. Braziller, New York, 1959
- The Academy: Five Centuries of Grandeur and Misery, from the Carracci to Mao Tse-Tung. Macmillan, New York, 1967
- Barnett Newman. Museum of Modern Art/New York Graphic Society, New York, 1971
- Woman as Sex Object: studies in erotic art, 1730-1970 (joint editor, with Linda Nochlin). London: Allen Lane, 1973
- Light in Art (joint editor, with John Ashbery). New York: Collier Books, 1971, c1969
