= Carl Joe Williams =

American visual artist

- Born: 30 July 1970 (age 55); New Orleans, Louisiana, U.S.
- Education: Atlanta College of Art
- Known for: Painting, Sculpture

Carl Joe Williams (30 July 1970, New Orleans, Louisiana) is an American visual artist based in New Orleans.

== Art career ==
Williams creates paintings and painted sculpture from found objects, references to pop culture and rhythmic patterns inspired by the geometric forms found in nature. His work was included in Reverb: Past, Present, Future, at the Contemporary Arts Center (New Orleans), where New York curator, Isolde Brielmaier, unpacked the tenth anniversary of Hurricane Katrina through the survey show. "I had this old chair that sat in my bathroom for the longest time, and I always saw it as a piece of sculpture. It looks like a hanger, but it almost looked like a piece of African sculpture to me."

He describes his works as “symphonies of colors” that present a powerful visual experience. Williams’ installation, Journeys, was featured at the Hartsfield-Jackson International Airport (Atlanta, GA) in 2002. And his Sculptural Trees public art installation in Metairie, Louisiana was described as reminiscent of “lollipops in a Candyland forest,” with their custom acrylic light boxes attached to crepe myrtles. Williams is one of the founders of Blights Out, a Creative Capital supported project in New Orleans along with artists Lisa Sigal and Imani Jacqueline Brown. Blights Out is a community- and artist-led initiative to activate agency in neighborhood development. This initiative was initiated as part of Prospect New Orleans, the largest biennial of international contemporary art in the U.S. His visual interpretations are enhanced by his vision of art and music as extensions of one another. An accomplished musician as well as a visual artist, Williams incorporates his musical compositions into videos and installations. Found objects play an important role in Williams’s works by becoming elements a narrative continuum that addresses societal and historical concerns.

Williams attended the New Orleans Center for Creative Art (NOCCA) where he received formal training. Williams continued his studies at Atlanta College of Art earning his BFA.

Williams is a founding member of Level Artist Collective, which includes artists Ana Hernandez, Horton Humble, Rontherin Ratliff, and John Isiah Walton. Williams has had a variety of exhibitions including at the George Ohr-O'Keefe Museum Of Art in Biloxi, Mississippi, at Crystal Bridges, at Convergence: JMC@P3 Exhibition in conjunction with Prospect 3+ New Orleans, Curated by Deborah Willis and Sponsored by the Joan Mitchell Center, New Orleans Museum of Art, Ohr-O'Keefe Museum Of Art (solo), at McKenna Museum of African American Art, Hammonds House Galleries, Atlanta, GA and permanent public art installations in Atlanta at Sweet Auburn Curb Market (as part of 1996 Summer Olympics) and at the Washington Park Tennis Center. In 2013 he was a recipient of the Joan Mitchell Center NOLA Studio Artist Residence Program. His work is included in the Crystal Bridges Museum of American Art Collection.

== See also ==
- painting
- Atlanta Airport
- New Orleans
- Contemporary Arts Center (New Orleans)
