= John Isiah Walton =

American artist (born 1985)

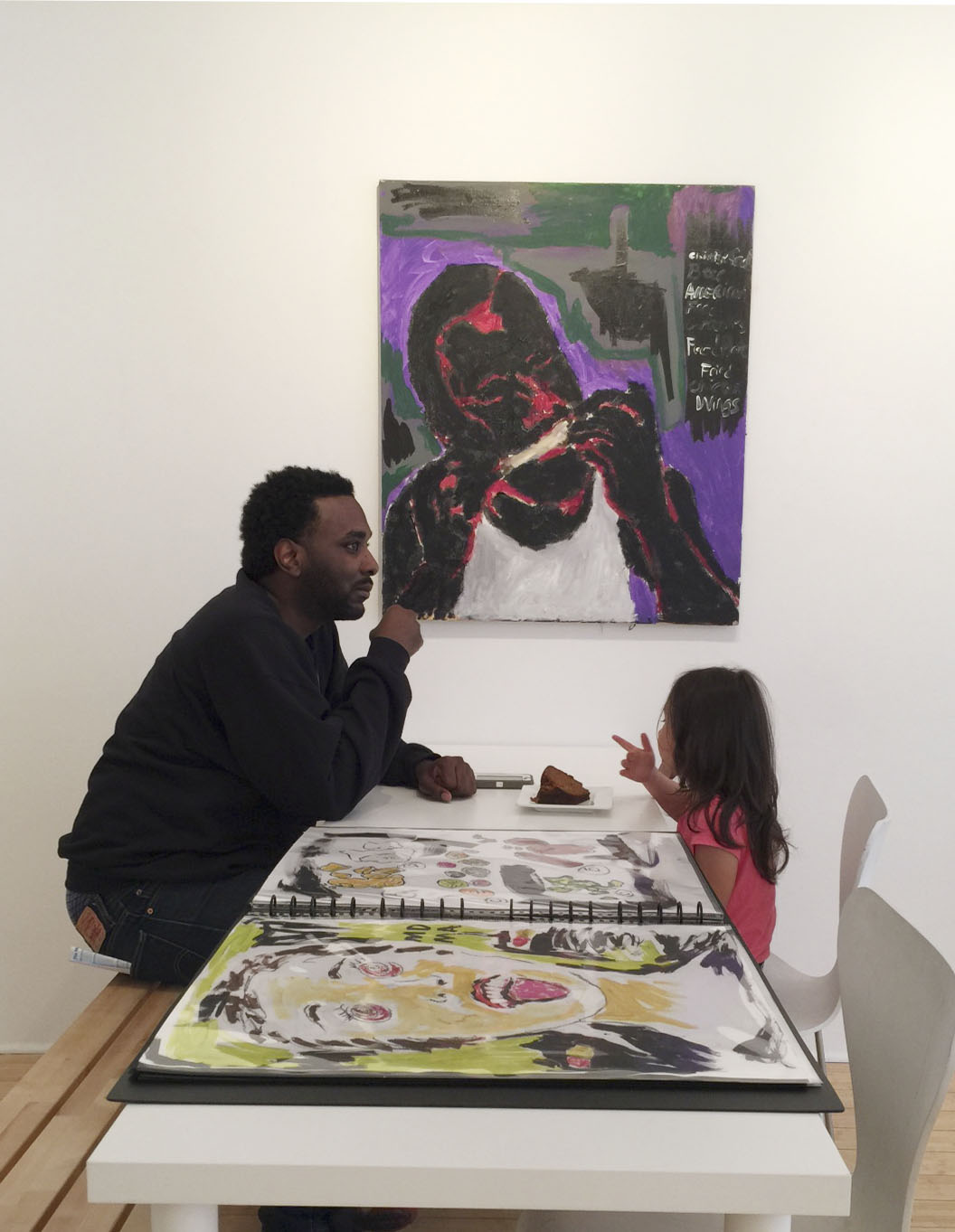
- Born: 1985 (age 39–40); New Orleans, LA, United States
- Known for: Conceptual Art
- Movement: Contemporary Art

John Isiah Walton was born in 1985 in New Orleans, where he currently lives and works as a fine artist. Walton was the first African American member of the artist collective The Front, and is also a founding member of Level Artist Collective, which includes artists Ana Hernandez, Horton Humble, Rontherin Ratliff, and Carl Joe Williams.

Walton often uses humor and irony to provide "stinging social commentary" on the topics of "race, identity, popular culture, and current events". Most of his work depicts life in New Orleans. Most projects consist of large scale paintings with fast, loose brush strokes.

Humidity shows life in New Orleans with the Sewage & Water Board, the abandoned Six Flags, and Cafe Du Monde. Rodeo featured portraits of bulls and bull fighters from the controversial Angola State Prison Rodeo. His previous series Zulu was a series of paintings of American political figures in blackface which is a reference to the Zulu Social Aid & Pleasure Club parade krewe.

His work has been exhibited in New York City, Austin, Texas, Los Angeles, North Carolina and Tokyo. His solo exhibitions include Beaucoup Humidity in 2015 curated by Diego Cortez and God Willing in 2016 both at P339 Gallery in New York, and Humidity at the George Ohr-O'Keefe Museum. Work from his Zulu series was included in the 2019 Atlanta Biennial. He has been included in group shows at the New Orleans Museum of Art, Grown Ass Kids at the Front, and Level's group exhibition at the Ogden Museum of Southern Art located in New Orleans, La. He has had many commissions and has done a residency at Macedonia Institute in New York and the Joan Mitchell Center in New Orleans, LA.
