= Sylvia Porter =

American economist and journalist

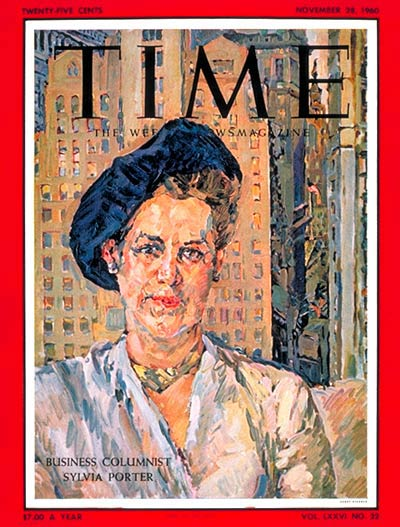
- Sylvia Porter on the cover of Time (November 28, 1960)
- Born: Sylvia Field Feldman; June 18, 1913; Patchogue, New York, U.S.
- Died: June 5, 1991 (aged 77); Pound Ridge, New York, U.S.
- Education: Hunter College
- Occupations: economist, journalist, author

Sylvia Field Porter (June 18, 1913 – June 5, 1991) was an American economist, journalist and author. At the height of her career, her readership was greater than 40 million people.

== Early life ==
Porter was born in Patchogue, New York, on Long Island as Sylvia Field Feldman to a Russian-Jewish couple, Louis and Rose Maisel Feldman. Originally majoring in English literature, she switched to economics and finance given the impact of the stock market crash of 1929. It has been suggested that her fiancé, bank employee Reed Porter, was relying upon Sylvia to explain the complications of the worldwide financial panic. They were married in 1931.

She graduated magna cum laude from Hunter College in 1932, and her expertise in government bonds enabled her to get a job as assistant to the president of an investment counseling firm. Working 12-hour days, she quickly learned more about the bond market, currency fluctuations and movements of the price of gold. In her spare time, she pursued an MBA at New York University.

== Writing career ==
Starting in 1934 as S. F. Porter, she published a newsletter devoted exclusively to U.S. government bonds, and was able to persuade the New York Post to hire her to write a thrice-weekly financial column.

She also began writing a financial column for American Banker, and published How To Make Money in Government Bonds (1939), the first book to cover all phases of government finance as well as to explain it in plain language. This was followed by If War Comes to the American Home, which relied upon simple language and interesting anecdotes to explain national defense to the average reader. In 1938, S.F. Porter became financial editor for the Post. It was not until 1942 that most of Porter's avid readers learned that their most trusted financial wizard was not a wise old man, but an attractive 29-year-old woman. The Post had concluded, correctly, that the widely respected columnist would be accepted regardless of gender. The "revelation" paved the way for Sylvia Porter to go on the radio, and the program What Can I Do? began regular broadcast from New York's WJZ.

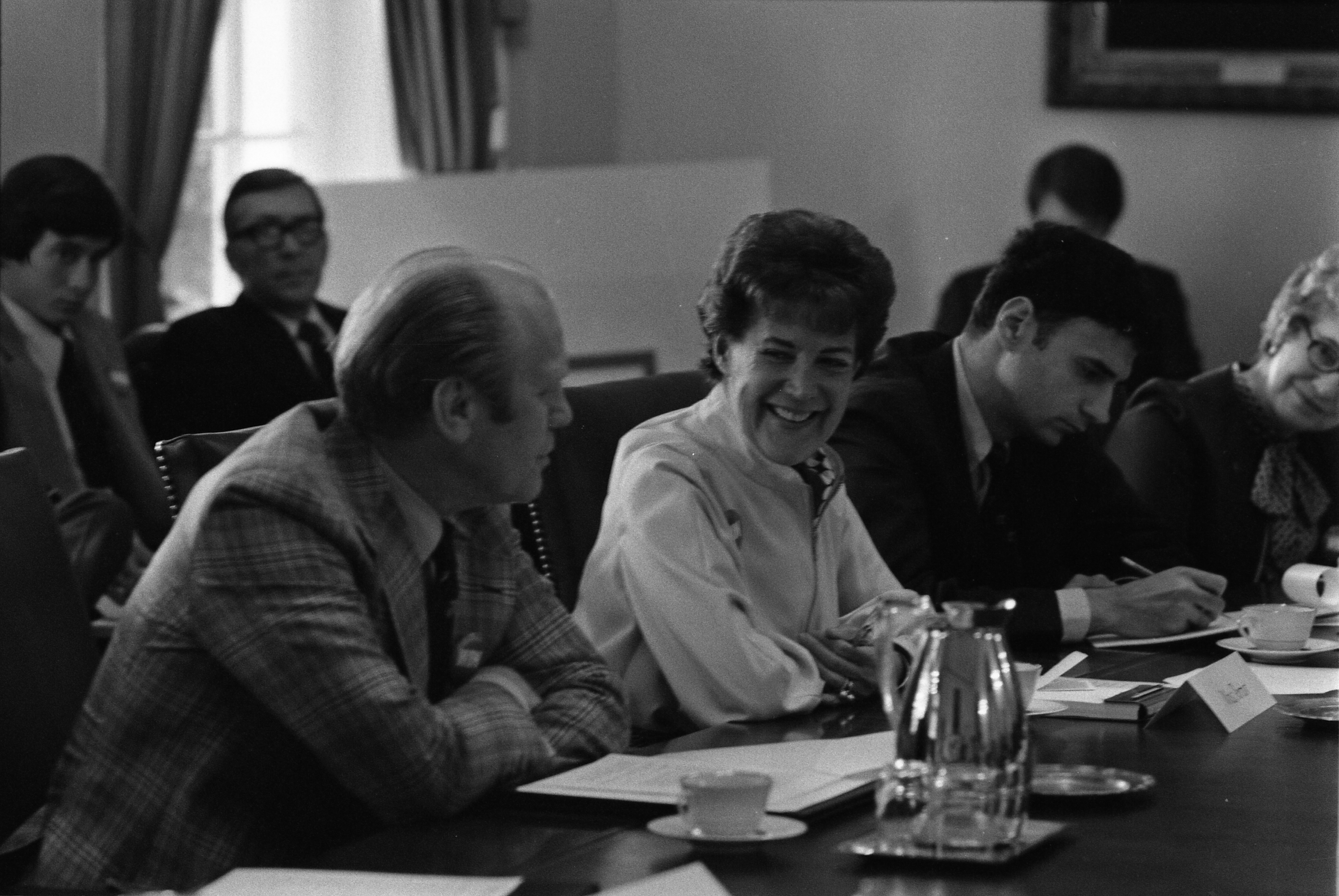
Porter, center, at a meeting with U.S. president Gerald Ford, left, and Ralph Nader, right, in 1974.

In 1959, Porter received an honorary degree from Bates College. She continued to add to her bibliography of bestsellers about the world of finance. In February 1966 Porter advised President Lyndon B. Johnson on the appointment of Andrew Brimmer, the first African American to serve on the Federal Reserve Board.

In 1975, she published Sylvia Porter's Money Book, subtitled "How to Earn It, Spend It, Save It, Invest It, Borrow It and Use It to Better Your Life". In addition to her regular newspaper column, Porter wrote monthly articles for the Ladies Home Journal during the years 1965 to 1982. After 43 years with the Post, she hired on with the New York Daily News in 1978. From 1984 to 1987, she had 400,000 subscribers to her magazine, Sylvia Porter's Personal Finance. In the 1980s, her name was attached to a series of personal finance software packages for home computers. In 1985, she received the Foreign Language Advocate Award from the Northeast Conference on the Teaching of Foreign Language in recognition of her support for language study in published columns. Her final work was Your Finances in the 1990s.

== Personal life ==
She married banker Reed Porter in 1931. She died on June 5, 1991, in Pound Ridge, New York.

== Books ==
A list of books authored by Sylvia Porter.

1. How to Make Money in Government Bonds, 1939
2. If War Comes to the American Home, 1941
3. How to Live Within Your Income, 1948
4. Money and You, 1949
5. Managing Your Money, 1953
6. Sylvia Porter's Income Tax Guide, 1960 (annual)
7. How to Get More for Your Money, 1961
8. Sylvia Porter's Money Book: How to Earn It, Spend It, Save It, Invest It, Borrow It and Use It to Better Your Life, 1975
