= Martin Chodorow =

Cognitive psychologist (born 1949)

- Occupations: Professor Emeritus of Psychology and Linguistics

Academic background
- Education: Ph. D. in Psychology, Massachusetts Institute of Technology

Academic work
- Institutions: Hunter College, Graduate Center, City University of New York

Martin Sanford Chodorow is a quantitative cognitive psychologist and an Emeritus Professor of Psychology and Linguistics at Hunter College and the City University of New York (CUNY) Graduate Center. Chodorow's research focuses on reading (including proofreading), implicit memory and semantic memory. His work in computational linguistics uses automated systems to detect grammar and errors in non-native English speakers and text coherence in both native and non-native writing.

== Biography ==
Chodorow was born on September 25th, 1949, in Waco, Texas. He received a Bachelor of Arts degree from the University of Texas at Austin in the spring of 1971. He completed his Ph.D. in cognitive psychology (psycholinguistics) from Massachusetts Institute of Technology (MIT), focusing on syntactic and lexical processes in language comprehension and working under the supervision of Merrill Garrett. While at MIT, Chodorow also worked with Jerry Fodor, Susan Carey, and Molly Potter.

Chodorow then completed a two-year postdoctoral fellowship in computational linguistics at IBM's Thomas Watson Research Center. He was a consultant for IBM, Princeton University's Cognitive Science Laboratory, and the Educational Testing Service.

As a faculty member at CUNY, Chodorow taught undergraduate courses in Cognitive Processing and Cognitive Science, and graduate courses in Statistics.

== Research ==
Chodorow's research in computational linguistics bridges theoretical lexical semantics, automated resource constructions, and applied educational technology. His most influential works have been across dictionary extraction, word sense disambiguation, short-answer assessment, and automated essay scoring. In his earlier work, he automated the extraction of genus terms from machine-readable dictionaries by applying head-finding heuristics to over 40,000 noun and 8,000 verb definitions. They constructed large-scale "tangled" semantic hierarchies, which he then introduced interactive sprouting procedure to grow taxonomic trees from root concepts and filtering methods to systemically isolate words which possess specific inherent traits across their senses to disambiguate these "tangled" structures. His research then focused on word sense disambiguation, where he established empirical benchmarks on semantically tagged Brown Corpus passages, proving that the most-frequent sense heuristic achieves 69% overall accuracy (52.2% on polysemous words), which outperforms random guessing at 26.8%. With George Miller and Claudia Leacock, they pioneered an unsupervised framework to automatically harvest vast training corpora from raw text collections in order to solve the knowledge acquisition bottleneck inherent in supervised statistical classifiers. This leveraged WordNet's monosemous relatives such as unambiguous synonyms, hyponyms, and hypernyms.

Chodorow further investigated contextual features and demonstrated that local syntactic cues provide high predictive accuracy for verbs and adjectives, and topical context remains beneficial for disambiguous nouns. He then translated these computational foundations and applied them in classrooms by developing the C-rater, an automated scoring engine for content-based short-answer questions in subjects ranging from science to reading comprehension. The C-rater was a true paraphrase recognizer through the Alchemist model-building interface, which normalizes responses into canonical predicate-argument tuples, resolves pronouns, handles morphological variation, and applies context-derived word similarity matrices, attaining an average 84% score agreement with human evaluators. The C-rater was specifically designed for content-based short-answer responses which could be mapped onto an expert-defined model answer, but not for longer responses to open-ended questions. Chodorow expanded this automated evaluation to composition and contributed to the Criterion Online Essay Evaluation Service, which integrated two systems. One of those systems was the Crtique writing analysis quite, which utilizes corpus-based bigram models, homophone context representations, and probabilistic voting algorithms to detect mechanical errors and chart discourse structure. The e-rater 2.0 engine was also integrated, which regression-weighed 12 linguistically aligned features for holistic essay scoring.

== Representative publications ==
- Burstein, J., Chodorow, M., & Leacock, C. (2004). Automated Essay Evaluation: The Criterion Online Writing Service. AI Magazine, 25(3), 27. https://doi.org/10.1609/aimag.v25i3.1774
- Chodorow, M. S., Byrd, R. J., & Heidorn, G. E. (1985). Extracting semantic hierarchies from a large on-line dictionary. In Proceedings of the 23rd Annual Meeting of the Association for Computational Linguistics (pp. 299–304). Association for Computational Linguistics. https://aclanthology.org/P85-1037/
- Leacock, C., Chodorow, M., & Miller, G. A. (1998). Using corpus statistics and WordNet relations for sense identification. Computational Linguistics, 24(1), 147–165. https://aclanthology.org/J98-1006/
- Leacock, C., & Chodorow, M. (2003). C-rater: Automated scoring of short-answer questions. Computers and the Humanities, 37(4), 389–405. https://doi.org/10.1023/A:1025779619903
- Miller, G. A., Chodorow, M., Landes, S., Leacock, C., & Thomas, R. G. (1994). Using a semantic concordance for sense identification. In Human Language Technology: Proceedings of a Workshop held at Plainsboro, New Jersey, March 8–11, 1994. https://aclanthology.org/H94-1046/

== Books ==
- Leacock, C., Chodorow, M., Gamon, M., & Tetreault, J. (2014). Automated grammatical error detection for language learners. Morgan & Claypool Publishers.
