= Liu Heung Shing =

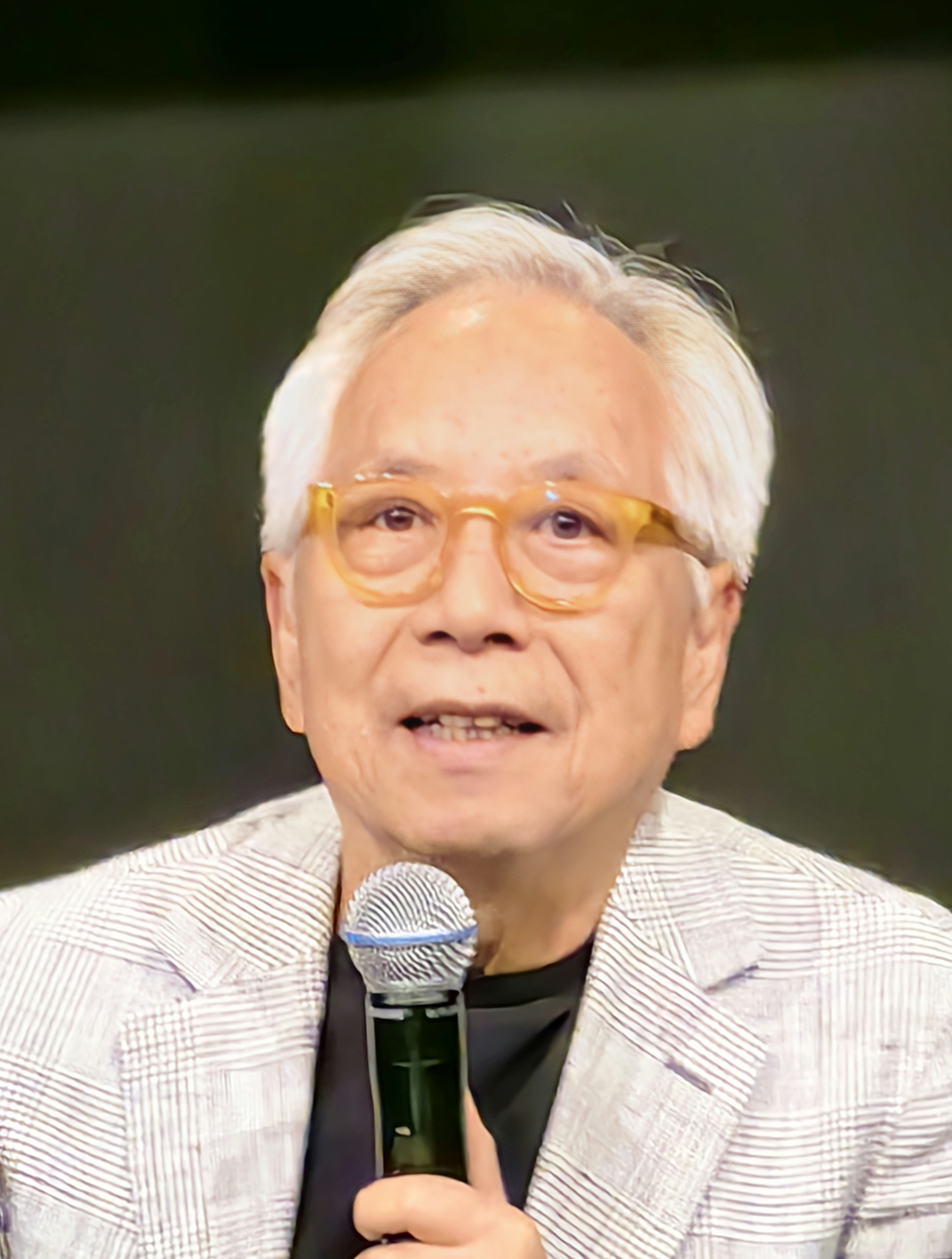
Liu Heung Shing at 2024 Hong Kong Book Fair

Liu Heung Shing (Note: In this Chinese name, the family name is Liu.) (Chinese: 劉香成, born 1951 in Hong Kong) is a Chinese American Pulitzer Prize winner former Associated Press photojournalist and photographer.

Having had multiple assignments across Asia and the US across the shifting geopolitical landscape that marked the last decades of the 20th century, Liu Heung Shing arguably most noted for having photographed two of its watershed historic events in the 20th century: The rise of China through the upheaval of its economic reforms; and the collapse of the Soviet Union under the stewardship of Mikhail Gorbachev. For these achievement, Liu was recognised by the Associated Press as Best Photographer in 1989 and 1991. His coverage of these events has also been awarded Photo of the Year by the University of Missouri, for his coverage of the Tiananmen Turmoil in 1989. In 1992, he shared with his colleagues in Moscow, a Pulitzer Prize for Spot News Photography for documenting the collapse of the Soviet Union. For this, he further received the Overseas Press Club award in 1992.

Today, Liu Heung Shing and his wife Karen Smith make their home in Shanghai, where Liu Heung Shing is the founding director of the Shanghai Centre of Photography.

== Background ==
Born in Hong Kong in 1951, he spent his early childhood studying in Fuzhou, China until returning to Hong Kong in 1960. At the age of 16, he went to the United States to study at the City University of New York’s Hunter College.

During his apprenticeship in New York with Life Magazine’s Gjon Mili, following university studies at Hunter College in the mid-1970s, Liu was influenced by the legendary team of Life photographers, and drew inspiration for his own career.

After graduating, he became a reporter for the Time Magazine serving as a foreign correspondent and photojournalist. He has been stationed as foreign correspondent in Beijing, Los Angeles, New Delhi, Seoul and Moscow.

In recognition of his book “China After Mao,” first published in 1983, Newsweek described Liu as “the Henri Cartier-Bresson of China.” As a photojournalist, Liu’s posting took him across the world and to cover the major stories of the last quarter of the 20th century. Capturing during the period of the 1970s to the mid-1980s in China, “Witness to an Era” offers a uniquely informed trans-cultural perspective on the complexities of the post-Mao era.

His photos from the 1989 Tiananmen Square protests and massacre received the Photo of the Year Award from the University of Missouri School of Communication in 1989.

In 1991, Liu Heung Shing while working for the Associated Press as a correspondent in Moscow took photographs of the Soviet Union’s President Gorbachev and his announcement of the Soviet Union’s dissolution, Liu Heung Shing, together with his colleagues won the Pulitzer Prize for Live News Photography Award in 1992.

In 1997, Liu Heung Shing became chief representative of Warner Media China, then known as Time-Warner. From 2000 to 2005, he served as executive vice president of Star TV a subsidiary of News Corp. He then joined the Creative Artists Agency as senior advisor. In 2015, Liu Heung Shing founded the Shanghai Centre of Photography.

More recently, Liu Heung Shing’s photographs have included portraits of individuals who fill China’s growing list of success stories from the world of business and the arts.

Liu Heung Shing is currently represented by Star Gallery in Beijing.

Liu Heung Shing has two children who live in France, Christopher Liu (born in 1983) and Benjamin Liu (born in 1987) from his former marriage to French sinologist Jacqueline Hemmer.

== Publications ==
- China after Mao: Seek the Truth From Facts (1983)
- USSR: The Collapse of an Empire (1991)
- China, Portrait of a Country (2008)
- Shanghai: A History in Photographs 1842 - Today (2010)
- China in Revolution: The Road to 1911 (2012)
- A Life in a Sea of Red (2019)
