= Jill Nathanson =

American painter, born 1955

- Born: 1955 (age 70–71)
- Education: Bennington College, Hunter College
- Known for: Abstract art
- Movement: Modernism
- Website: jillnathanson.com

Jill Nathanson (born 1955) is an American visual artist and educator. She is associated with color field painting. Nathanson lives in New York City.

== Biography ==
Nathanson attended Bennington College in Vermont, where she studied with Larry Poons and Kenneth Noland. She received her MFA degree from Hunter College in 1982. In the 1980s she worked at the Triangle artists workshops at the invitation of Triangle co-founder Anthony Caro.

== Work ==
In addition to her training in abstraction, Nathanson's work is informed by a study of Torah and Jewish mysticism. In the 2000s, Nathanson collaborated with Judaic scholar Arnold Eisen in an interpretation of Exodus Chapter 33. Nathanson painted abstract pictures based on Eisen's analysis of the text, then Eisen wrote commentaries based on her paintings. She explained to The Forward that she sought to avoid making literal interpretations of the story. "My aesthetic, as a painter, has been to paint the forces, to make the forces and the pressures palpable in the eye through color and structure." Works from that time also cite the Book of Genesis, as documented by critic Joan Waltemath: "Taking Genesis as a point of departure, Nathanson starts by using the debris from her studio floor, allowing her work to emerge from an essential chaos to create a series of freeform, sprawling mixed-media pieces. Nathanson uses gels, decorative paper, and adhesives in combination with poured acrylic paint to create the support structure of her pieces—a formal play that points to the creation of the earth in the text." Other paintings took cues from descriptions of color in the Zohar. The paintings sometimes incorporated phrases written in Hebrew.

Nathanson's paintings since the late 2000s are color field abstractions. She creates small studies made from shapes cut from color gels. She then duplicates the compositions and textures from the studies on large canvases, using acrylic painting mediums optimized for pouring that were developed for her by Golden Artist Colors. Critic Peter Malone described the process: "Completed with five or six overlapping translucent shapes created by pouring a prepared color along a line that has been drawn and masked, each painting reiterates a basic compositional pattern. Large areas of color, poured between a predetermined line and that part of the frame's edge delineated by the line's endpoints, fill the entire frame in a collage-like translucent screen."

== Critical reception ==
James Panero reported in 2011 in The New Criterion that "Nathanson's experiment in studio process and biblical scholarship is both an inspiration and a challenge for a new (old) direction in art."

In The Hudson Review, Karen Wilkin wrote of a 2018 solo exhibition that "Nathanson's painstaking method demands close attention and enormous expertise, yet the resulting images never appear labored or calculated.... Nothing is predictable, yet everything seems right, rather like the assonances and dissonances in a Charles Ives or Igor Stravinsky score." Critic Christina Kee said of the same exhibition, "the works seem to suggest a departure from color as a physically grounded phenomenon towards a powerful, though weightless, force acting upon us."

In an interview with curator Jaime Desimone of the Museum of Contemporary Art Jacksonville, Nathanson articulated her concept of "color desire," in which "heavy, poured colors in my paintings pull the viewer across the painting through the color relationships." Whitehot Magazine critic Cori Hutchinson wrote that this "color desire" "tugs on the viewer as one's gaze travels across each work; the painter is uniquely aware of the somatic effects of art and its relationship to pulse."

== Museum collections ==
- Agnes Etherington Art Centre
- Museum of Contemporary Art Jacksonville
- Museum of Fine Arts, Houston
- Sheldon Museum of Art
