= Ann Purcell =

American painter

Ann Purcell (born 1941) is an American painter.

Born in Arlington County, Virginia, Purcell earned her bachelor's degree in painting from the Corcoran School of Art and George Washington University in 1973, after independent study in Mexico from 1969 to 1971. In 1995 she received a Master of Arts degree in Liberal Studies from New York University. She has been invited to many exhibitions, solo and group, both in the United States and abroad. An abstract expressionist, she received a Pollock-Krasner Foundation grant in 1989 and in 2018; a Lester Hereward Cooke foundation grant for mid-career achievement in painting in 1988 associated through The National Gallery of Art, Wash., D.C.; a fellowship at the MacDowell Colony in 1975; and grants from the New York Foundation for the Arts in 2013, the Joan Mitchell Foundation in 2014, and the Adolph and Esther Gottlieb Foundation in 2014. She has been a guest lecturer at Indiana State University, the Smithsonian American Art Museum, and Long Island University, and was on the faculty of the Corcoran School of Art and the Smithsonian Institution from 1974 to 1979; from 1983 to 1985 she taught at the Parsons School of Design. Museums which own examples of Purcell's work include the National Gallery of Art, the Phillips Collection, the National Museum of Women in the Arts, the Santa Barbara Museum of Art, the New Orleans Museum of Art, the Virginia Museum of Fine Arts, and the Salt Lake City Museum, and it may be found in numerous private and corporate collections as well.
