= Homunculus et la Belle Etoile =

Poem by Wallace Stevens

"Homunculus et la Belle Etoile" is a poem from Wallace Stevens's first book of poetry, Harmonium. It was first published in 1919.

Homunculus et la Belle Etoile

In the sea, Biscayne, there prinks
The young emerald, evening star,
Good light for drunkards, poets, widows,
And ladies soon to be married.

By this light the salty fishes
Arch in the sea like tree-branches,
Going in many directions
Up and down.

This light conducts
The thoughts of drunkards, the feelings
Of widows and trembling ladies,
The movements of fishes.

How pleasant an existence it is
That this emerald charms philosophers,
Until they become thoughtlessly willing
To bathe their hearts in later moonlight,

Knowing that they can bring back thought
In the night that is still to be silent,
Reflecting this thing and that,
Before they sleep!

It is better that, as scholars,
They should think hard in the dark cuffs
Of voluminous cloaks,
And shave their heads and bodies.

It might well be that their mistress
Is no gaunt fugitive phantom.
She might, after all, be a wanton,
Abundantly beautiful, eager,

Fecund,
From whose being by starlight, on sea-coast,
The innermost good of their seeking
Might come in the simplest of speech.

It is a good light, then, for those
That know the ultimate Plato,
Tranquillizing with this jewel
The torments of confusion.

== Interpretation ==
The poem pursues a contrast between poetic imagination and philosophical reasoning, the latter understood as abstract system-building associated with the rationalist tradition going back to Plato. Stevens implicitly contrasts the philosophers' Plato with 'the ultimate Plato'. Both seek the supreme good, but Plato and the other philosophers look for it in something abstract like Plato's 'Forms'—a gaunt fugitive phantom. The poet finds the highest good in the sensuous lived experience of an evening in Biscayne, where the good light of Venus, the Evening Star, reveals it to the poet as wanton, abundantly beautiful, eager, fecund. (For comparison see "On the Manner of Addressing Clouds" and "Six Significant Landscapes".)
