= Valley Candle =

Poem by Wallace Stevens

"Valley Candle" is a poem from Wallace Stevens's first book of poetry, Harmonium. It is in the public domain according to Librivox, having been first published prior to the 1923 publication year of Harmonium.

Valley Candle

My candle burned alone in an immense valley.
Beams of the huge night converged upon it,
Until the wind blew.
Then beams of the huge night
Converged upon its image,
Until the wind blew.

== Interpretation ==
Whalen proposes that most critics see the poem as an allegory of the mind. The candle is ablaze with conscious life, or it has the illuminating power of the creative artist. It may be an apology for the imagination's slanted light, which will not sustain a heavy burden.

One interpretive choice point is whether "Valley Candle" should be compared to "Anecdote of the Jar", as granting ordering power to the candle like the jar's. Rehder proposes the comparison. Both objects create the world from which they come; they are the fixed points, the centers, "necessary to change chaos to order and to communicate purpose." Whalen rejects the comparison.
