= List of Picasso artworks 1901–1910 =

Pablo Picasso, 1901, Old Woman (Woman with Gloves), oil on cardboard, 67 x 52.1 cm, Philadelphia Museum of Art

Le Gourmet, 1901, National Gallery of Art, Washington, D.C.

Pedro Mañach, 1901, National Gallery of Art, Washington, D.C.

Pablo Picasso, 1901, Harlequin and his Companion (Les deux saltimbanques), oil on canvas, 73 x 60 cm, Pushkin Museum, Moscow

Pablo Picasso, 1901, Portrait de Mateu Fernández de Soto, oil on canvas, 61.3 x 46.5 cm, Bundesmuseen, Vienna

Pablo Picasso, 1901–02, Femme au café (Absinthe Drinker), oil on canvas, 73 x 54 cm, Hermitage Museum, Saint Petersburg, Russia

Pablo Picasso, 1902, Le bock (Portrait de Jaime Sabartes), oil on canvas, 82 x 66 cm, The Pushkin Museum, Moscow

Pablo Picasso, 1902, Woman with Bangs, 61.3 x 51.4 cm, The Baltimore Museum of Art, Maryland

Pablo Picasso, 1902, La buveuse assoupie (The Absinthe drinker), oil on panel, 80 x 62 cm, Kunstmuseum Bern

Pablo Picasso, 1902, Maternité (Motherhood), Private collection

Pablo Picasso, 1902–03, Femme assise (Melancholy Woman), oil on canvas, 100 x 69.2 cm, The Detroit Museum of Art, Michigan

Pablo Picasso, 1902–03, Femme accroupie, Crouching Woman (Woman Sitting, with Hood), oil on canvas, 90 x 71 cm, Staatsgalerie Stuttgart

Pablo Picasso, 1902–03, La soupe (The soup), oil on canvas, 38.5 x 46.0 cm, Art Gallery of Ontario, Toronto, Canada

Pablo Picasso, 1903, La Famille Soler, oil on canvas, 150 x 200 cm, Musée des Beaux-Arts de Liège

Pablo Picasso, 1903, Desemparats (Maternité, Mère et enfant au fichu, Motherhood), pastel on paper, 47.5 x 41 cm, Museu Picasso, Barcelona

Pablo Picasso, 1903, L'Étreinte, pastel

The Tragedy, 1903, National Gallery of Art, Washington, D.C.

Pablo Picasso, 1904, Le repas frugal (The Frugal Repast). Printed in 1913. Etching. Plate: 46.7 x 36 cm; Sheet: 65.4 x 47.6 cm. Collection UCLA Grunwald Center for the Graphic Arts, Hammer Museum, California

Pablo Picasso, 1904, Woman with a Helmet of Hair, gouache on tan wood pulp board, 42.7 x 31.3 cm, Art Institute of Chicago

Pablo Picasso, 1904–05, Les Baladins (Mother and Child, Acrobats), gouache on canvas, 90 x 71 cm Staatsgalerie, Stuttgart

Pablo Picasso, 1904–05, l'Acteur (The Actor), oil on canvas, 196.2 x 115.3 cm, Metropolitan Museum of Art

Pablo Picasso, 1905, Lady with a Fan (Femme à l'éventail), oil on canvas, 100.3 x 81 cm, The National Gallery of Art, Washington, DC.

Family of Saltimbanques, 1905, National Gallery of Art, Washington, DC.

Pablo Picasso, 1905, Salomé (La danse barbare)

Pablo Picasso, 1905, Au Lapin Agile (At the Lapin Agile) (Arlequin tenant un verre), oil on canvas, 99.1 x 100.3 cm, Metropolitan Museum of Art

Pablo Picasso, 1905, Acrobat's Family with a Monkey (Famille au Singe), collage, gouache, watercolor, pastel and India ink on cardboard, 104 x 75 cm, Göteborgs Konstmuseum, Goteburg

Pablo Picasso, 1905, Maternité (Mother and Child), private collection

Pablo Picasso, 1905, Arlequin (Harlequin's head), oil on panel, private collection

The Dance of Salome, 1905, black ink on gray paper. Platemark: 40.6 × 34.6 cm, Cooper Hewitt, Smithsonian Design Museum

Pablo Picasso, 1905, Les Saltimbanques (The Acrobats)

Pablo Picasso, 1905, Acrobate à la Boule (Acrobat on a Ball), oil on canvas, 147 x 95 cm, The Pushkin Museum, Moscow

Pablo Picasso, 1905, Acrobate et jeune Arlequin (Acrobat and Young Harlequin), oil on canvas, 191.1 x 108.6 cm, The Barnes Foundation, Philadelphia

Pablo Picasso, 1905, Fillette nue au panier de fleurs (Le panier fleuri), oil on canvas, 155 x 66 cm, private collection, New York

Pablo Picasso, 1905, Nus (Nudes), pencil on paper

Pablo Picasso, 1905, La Belle Hollandaise, gouache on cardboard mounted on wood, 77.1 x 65.8 cm, Queensland Art Gallery, Brisbane

Pablo Picasso, 1905, Les Trois Hollandaises, peinture à la colle sur carton, 77 x 67 cm, Musée Picasso, Paris

Pablo Picasso, 1905–06, Les deux frères (The two brothers), oil on canvas, 141.4 x 97.1 cm, Kunstmuseum Basel

Pablo Picasso, 1906, La Mort d'Arlequin (Death of Harlequin), gouache and pencil on board, 68.5 x 96 cm, private collection

Pablo Picasso, 1906, Nu aux mains serrées, gouache on canvas, 96.5 x 75.6 cm, Art Gallery of Ontario

Pablo Picasso, 1906, Femme se coiffant (Woman Combing her Hair), crayon, charcoal on paper. Dimensions and whereabouts unknown

Pablo Picasso, 1906, Seated Male Nude (Homme nu assis), oil on canvas, 34.9 x 24.1 cm, Barnes Foundation

Pablo Picasso, 1907, Nu à la serviette, oil on canvas, 116 x 89 cm

Pablo Picasso, 1907, Femme nue, oil on canvas, 92 x 43 cm, Museo delle Culture, Milano

Pablo Picasso, 1907, Head of a Sleeping Woman (Study for Nude with Drapery), oil on canvas, 61.4 x 47.6 cm, The Museum of Modern Art, New York

Pablo Picasso, 1907, Nu aux bras levés (Nude)

Pablo Picasso, 1907, Les Demoiselles d'Avignon, oil on canvas, 243.9 × 233.7 cm, Museum of Modern Art, New York

Pablo Picasso, 1907–08, Two Trees (Les Arbres), watercolor on paper, 47.9 x 62.7 cm, Philadelphia Museum of Art

Pablo Picasso, 1907–08, Vase of Flowers, oil on canvas, 92.1 x 73 cm, Museum of Modern Art

Pablo Picasso, 1908, Woman's Head (Tête de femme), oil on canvas, 73.6 x 60.6 cm, Museum of Modern Art

Pablo Picasso, 1908, Seated Woman, oil on canvas, 150 x 99 cm, Hermitage Museum, Saint Petersburg

Pablo Picasso, 1908, Dryad, oil on canvas, 185 x 108 cm, Hermitage Museum, St Petersburg

This is a partial list of artworks produced by Pablo Picasso from 1901 to 1910.

This phase of Picasso's life saw his stylistic development continue through his Blue, Rose and proto-Cubist periods (sometimes referred to as Picasso's African Period).

== 1901 ==
- Pedro Mañach (oil on canvas, 105.5 x 70.2 cm, Chester Dale collection, National Gallery of Art, Washington, DC.)
- L'enfant au pigeon (known as Child with a Dove)
- Portrait du Père Manyac
- Pierreuse, la main sur l'épaule
- Portrait de Jaime Sabartés (Le bock)
- Portrait de Mateu Fernández de Soto, Bundesmuseen, Vienna
- Les deux saltimbanques (Arlequin et sa compagne)
- Arlequin accoudé (oil on canvas, lined and mounted to a sheet of pressed cork, 83.2 x 61.3 cm, Metropolitan Museum of Art)
- La diseuse
- Portrait de Jaime Sabartés
- Picasso avec partenaire
- Femme en robe verte assise
- Couple de 'Rastaquoueres'
- Vendeuse de fleurs
- Yo, Picasso
- Femme dans la rue
- Le Bassin des Tuileries
- La espera (Margot)
- Longchamp
- Nature morte (Le dessert)
- Sada Yacco
- Le 'Divan Japonais'
- Le Roi Soleil
- La Nana
- Mère et enfant devant un vase de fleurs
- Le gourmet (oil on canvas, 92.8 x 68.3 cm, Chester Dale collection, National Gallery of Art, Washington, DC.)
- La chambre bleue (Le tub)
- Femme sortant du bain
- Jeanne (Nu couché)
- Femme en bleu
- Femme au chapeau à plumes
- Courtisane au collier de gemmes
- Profil d'une jeune femme (fille avec fleur rouge) (oil on canvas, 52.1 x 33.7 cm, Metropolitan Museum of Art)
- La Madrilène (Tête de jeune femme)
- Tête de femme
- Femme au bonnet
- Femme portant une cape
- Femme à la cigarette
- Buveur d'absinthe
- Buveuse d'absinthe
- La femme au chignon
- La jupe rouge
- Le suicide (Casagemas)
- La mort de Casagemas
- La mort de Casagemas (Casagemas dans son cercueil)
- Evocation (L'enterrement de Casagemas)
- Femme aux bras croisés
- Femme aux bijoux
- Portrait de Bibi-la-pureé
- Bibi-la-purée assis
- Femme dans un café
- Café concert de Málaga
- Les fugitives
- Femme en vert
- Fillette au chapeau
- Jardin de Paris (Ink and watercolour on paper, 64.8 x 49.5 cm, Metropolitan Museum of Art)
- Mère et enfant (oil on canvas, 41 x 32.7 cm, Metropolitan Museum of Art)
- Femme nue assise
- Autoportrait 'Yo' (Étude)
- Femme souriante au chapeau à plumes
- Femme aux bas-bleus
- Les Soupeurs
- Femme avec un chien
- Lis jaunes
- Lola Ruiz Picasso
- Femme aux bras croisés
- Le quatorze juillet
- Au café
- Arte Joven
- Deux femmes
- Portrait de Gustave Coquiot
- Autoportrait devant Le Moulin Rouge
- Autoportrait avec Jaume Andreu Bonsons
- Les toits bleus
- Sur le pont supérieur
- Le divan japonais
- Femme de Saint-Lazare par clair de lune
- Portrait de Minguell
- Boulevard de Clichy
- Portrait d'homme (Bibi-la-purée)
- Buste de femme
- La conversation
- Gustave Coquiot
- Carmencita et buste de femme
- Au champ de courses
- Homme et femme
- Au Moulin Rouge (La fille du Roi d'Egypte)
- Mère et enfant
- Paysan de Tolède
- Le poète Alberto Lozano
- Rusiñol et Casas
- Célestine et un couple
- Chanteuse
- Danseuse de cancan
- Courses de taureaux
- Clown au singe
- Jardin public
- Ballerina
- Harlequin and His Companion (Les deux saltimbanques)
- Crazy Woman with Cats (oil on canvas, 45.1 x 40.8 cm, Art Institute of Chicago)
- Fleurs (oil on canvas, 651 x 489 mm, Tate)
- Peonies (Oil on hardboard mounted on plywood, 57.8 x 39.3 cm, National Gallery of Art, Washington, DC.)
- Woman Ironing (oil on canvas, 49.5 x 25.7 cm, Metropolitan Museum of Art)
- La Gommeuse

== 1902 ==
- La buveuse assoupie (The Absinthe drinker)
- Miséreuse accroupie
- La Soupe
- Femme fatiguée, ivre
- L'entrevue (Les deux soeurs)
- Vendeur du gul
- Tête d'une femme morte
- Femme en bleu
- Femme avec un châle
- Mère et fils sur le rivage
- Mère et enfant sur le rivage
- Dans un cabaret
- Portrait de Corina Romeu
- Portrait de Juli González
- La femme avec la bordure
- Femme nue aux cheveux longs
- Homme et femme
- Barcelone, paysage d'été
- Femme aux bas verts
- Mère et fille au bord de la mer
- Homme en bleu
- Pierreuses au bar
- Homme et femme avec un chat
- Femme aux Bras Croisés
- Femme nue II
- Les deux sœurs (Étude)
- L'étreinte
- Profil de femme
- Femme assise au capuchon
- Mère et enfant
- Femme nue I
- Le boxeur
- La Vie
- Cactus
- Woman with Bangs
- Erotic Scene (known as "La Douleur") (1902 or 1903) (oil on canvas, 174.9 x 99.7 cm, Metropolitan Museum of Art)

== 1903 ==
- La vie
- Femme accroupie, Crouching Woman
- Des pauvres au bord de la mer
- Riera de Sant Joan à l'aube
- Le Palais des Arts à Barcelone
- Les Toits de Barcelone
- Les Toits de Barcelone au clair de lune
- Tête de femme (oil on canvas, 40.3 x 35.6 cm, Metropolitan Museum of Art)
- L'Étreinte
- Groupe de pauvres
- L'Aveugle et sa famille
- Sebastià Junyer-Vidal comme rhapsode
- Sebastià Junyer-Vidal en matador
- Couple dans un café (croquis)
- Couple dans un café
- Sebastià Junyer-Vidal avec une femme à ses côtés
- La Famille Soler
- Portrait de madame Soler
- Portrait du tailleur Soler
- Portrait bleu de Angel Fernández de Soto (Also known as The Absinthe Drinker) (oil on canvas, 70.3 x 55.3 cm, Private collection)
- Lady at Eden Concert
- Heure du dîner (Évocation de Horta d'Ebre)
- Vieux guitariste aveugle
- Repas de l'aveugle (oil on canvas, 95.3 x 94.6 cm, Metropolitan Museum of Art)
- Masque d'un chanteur aveugle
- Mère et enfant au fichu
- Le Vieux juif (Le vieillard)
- Vieille femme se chauffant les mains au feu
- Accordéoniste et enfants
- Mateu et Angel Fernández de Soto avec Anita
- Mère et enfant au bord de la mer
- Paysage catalan
- Jeune fille accoudée
- Le Vieux juif
- Étude de nu debout
- Jeune femme au café courtisée par un Pierrot (L'Offrande)
- Tête de vieil homme barbu
- Mlle Bresina assise dans un fauteuil
- Spectateurs de corrida
- Femme à la boucle
- Maternité
- The Tragedy (Oil on wood, 105.3 x 69 cm, Chester Dale collection, National Gallery of Art, Washington, DC.)
- The Old Guitarist (Oil on panel, 122.9 x 82.6 cm, Art Institute of Chicago)

== 1904 ==
- Le fou (L'idiot)
- La repasseuse
- Célestine
- Le repas frugal
- Femme à la corneille
- Deux personnages
- La chambre de la repasseuse
- Femme accoudée
- Le fou
- Femme dormante (Meditation)
- Nu dormant
- Les deux amies
- Les amants
- Vierge à la guirlande
- Portrait de Manolo Hugué
- Portrait de Sebastià Junyent
- Portrait de Sebastià Junyer-Vidal
- Portrait de Jaume Sabartés
- Femme au chignon
- Madeleine
- Portrait de Suzanne Bloch (oil on canvas, 65 x 54 cm, São Paulo Museum of Art)
- L'acteur (oil on canvas, 196 x 115 cm, Metropolitan Museum of Art)
- Acrobate au ballon (Fillette au ballon) (oil on canvas, 197 x 95 cm, Pushkin Museum of Fine Arts, Moscow)
- Au Lapin Agile (Arlequin tenant un verre) (oil on canvas, 99.1 x 100.3 cm, Metropolitan Museum of Art)
- Femme au châle rouge (Suzanne Bloch)
- Le baiser
- Homme nu assis et femme nue debout
- Mère et enfant
- Le saltimbanque
- Femme couchée
- La Vie
- La Chumarabe

== 1905 ==
- Three Studies of an Acrobat (Ink on paper, 24.1 x 31.4 cm, Metropolitan Museum of Art)
- Saltimbanque in Profile (Essence on paper board, 79.4 x 59.7 cm, Metropolitan Museum of Art)
- Garçon à la pipe (oil on canvas, 100 x 81.3 cm, Private collection)
- Famille de saltimbanques (Les Bateleurs)
- Famille d'acrobates avec singe
- Acrobate et jeune arlequin
- Maternité (Mother and Child)
- Mallorquine and le Tragédie
- Femme à la chemise (oil on canvas, 727 x 600 mm, Tate)
- Famille d'arlequin
- Tête de Hurdy-gurdy
- Hurdy-gurdy
- Bouffon et jeune acrobate
- Profil droit de bouffon
- Famille de bateleurs
- Famille de saltimbanques (oil on canvas, 212.8 x 229.6 cm, Chester Dale collection, National Gallery of Art, Washington, DC.)
- Famille de saltimbanques (Étude)
- Le Singe assis
- Garçon à la Collerette
- Garçon avec chien
- Deux saltimbanques avec un chien
- Mère et enfant (Baladins)
- Portrait de Madame Benedetta Canals
- Deux coqs
- Au bord du canal
- Un bateau sur le canal
- Paysage hollandais avec moulins à vent
- Profil de Hollandaise
- Hollandaise au bord du canal
- Les Trois Hollandaises
- Nus entrelacés
- Garçon avec un bouquet de fleurs
- Femme à l'éventail (Lady with a Fan) (oil on canvas, 100.3 x 81 cm, National Gallery of Art, Washington, DC.)
- Jeune fille nue avec panier de fleurs (Fillette nue au panier de fleurs, also Le panier fleuri or Fillette à la corbeille fleurie)
- Femme nue assise
- Écuyère à cheval
- Arlequin à cheval
- Gros bouffon assis
- Acrobate et jeune arlequin
- Arlequin (Harlequin's head)
- La Belle Hollandaise
- Le Roi
- Madeleine nue
- Bouffon et jeune acrobate
- Arlequin se grimant devant une femme assise
- La Coiffure (Étude)
- Asservissement
- Juggler with Still Life (Gouache on cardboard, 100 x 69.9 cm, National Gallery of Art, Washington, DC.)
- Artiste de cirque et enfant (Ink and watercolour on paper, 168 x 105 mm, Tate)
- Cheval avec jeune homme en bleu (1905–06) (Watercolour and gouache on paper, 498 x 321 mm, Tate)
- Portrait de Gertrude Stein (1905–06) (oil on canvas, 100 x 81.3 cm, Metropolitan Museum of Art)
- Les deux frères (Gouache on cardboard, 80 x 59 cm, Musée Picasso, Paris)
- Les deux frères (The two brothers) (oil on canvas, 141.4 x 97.1 cm, Kunstmuseum Basel)
- Salomé (La danse barbare)
- Jeune homme et cheval 1905–06, (oil on canvas, 220.6 cm × 131.2 cm, MoMA)

== 1906 ==
- Nu aux mains serrées, gouache on canvas, 96.5 x 75.6 cm, Art Gallery of Ontario
- Young Woman of Gósol (Conté crayon on paper, 62.2 x 36.2 cm, Metropolitan Museum of Art)
- The Two Youths (oil on canvas, 151.5 x 93.7 cm, National Gallery of Art, Washington, D.C.)
- autorretrato
- La mort d'Arlequin (Death of Harlequin)
- Portrait d'Allan Stein
- Jeune espagnol
- Tête de jeune homme
- Garçon nu
- Trois nus
- Les adolescents
- Meneur de cheval nu
- Les Paysans
- Composition: Les paysans
- La Coiffure (oil on canvas, 174.9 x 99.7 cm, Metropolitan Museum of Art)
- La toilette
- Jeune fille à la chèvre
- Femme nue debout
- Deux femmes nues
- Nu sur fond rouge
- Autoportrait (oil on canvas mounted on honeycomb panel, 26.7 x 19.7 cm, Metropolitan Museum of Art)
- Autoportrait à la palette
- Lit avec moustiquaire
- Nu aux mains jointes
- Portrait de Fernande Olivier au foulard
- La porteuse de pains
- Femme sur un âne
- Nu couché (Fernande)
- Fernande à la mantille
- El Tinen
- Nature morte aux vases
- Nu, étude pour le harem
- Le Harem
- Etude pour les demoiselles
- Nu assis et nu debout
- Tête de femme
- Buste de femme
- Paysage de Gósol
- Marins en bordée
- Garçon et fillette nus
- Meneur de cheval nu
- Taureau
- Portrait de Fernande
- Tête de Josep Fondevila (oil on canvas, 45.1 x 40.3 cm, Metropolitan Museum of Art)
- La toilette
- Femme nue vue de dos avec enfant
- Satyre et jeune fille
- Garçon au caleçon
- La toilette (Étude)
- Chevaux au bain (oil on canvas, 100 x 81.3 cm, Metropolitan Museum of Art)
- La danse (Etude pour 'Vase bleu')
- L'abreuvoir (La Suite des Saltimbanques L8)
- Chevalier, enfant, femme, cruche et main
- Femme debout
- Femme nue (oil on canvas, 81.8 x 66 cm, Art Institute of Chicago)
- L'étreinte
- Femme assise
- Portrait de femme et deux femmes

== 1907 ==
- Les Demoiselles d'Avignon (oil on canvas, 243.9 cm × 233.7 cm, MoMA)
- Autoportrait
- Fleurs sur une table
- Cruche, bol et citron
- Portrait de Max Jacob
- Femme debout
- Femmes nues de profil
- Hiboux
- Tête d'homme
- Grande danseuse d'Avinyó
- Femme nue (Étude)
- Demoiselle d'Avinyó
- Buste de femme
- Buste de Demoiselle d'Avinyó
- Femme nue accroupie
- Tête d'étudiant médical
- Marin et étudiant
- Étudiant médical et six femmes nues
- Les demoiselles d'Avinyó (2)
- Les demoiselles d'Avinyó (Étude)(1)
- Les demoiselles d'Avinyó (Étude)(2)
- Les demoiselles d'Avinyó (Croquis)
- Nu à la serviette
- La danse aux voiles (Nu à la draperie)
- Trois femmes sous un arbre
- Amitié
- Tête d'homme (1)
- Tête d'homme (2)
- Homme nu aux mains croisées
- Buste de marin
- Tête de femme (Étude pour 'Nu à la draperie')
- Tronc de femme aux mains jointes
- Femme assise
- Buste de marin
- Les Demoiselles d'Avinyó (Étude)
- Nu à la draperie (Étude)
- Masque nègre
- Nu jaune
- Nu couché
- Marin roulant une cigarette
- Paysage
- Deux Femmes assises
- Femme au corsage jaune
- Nu debout de profil
- Pots et citron
- Nu debout, Trois femmes (Étude)
- Trois femmes (Étude)
- Cinq femmes
- Nu aux bras levés
- Nu à la draperie (Étude)
- Fleurs exotiques (Bouquet dans un vase)
- Nature morte (Étude)
- Les citrons
- Tête de personnage
- Fétiche (Trois notes)
- Totem
- Tête
- Danseuse
- Feuillage
- Paysage
- Cinq femmes II
- Cinq femmes III
- Cinq femmes IV
- Pablo Ruiz Picasso
- Cinq femmes V
- Nu à la serviette (Étude)
- L'amitié (Étude)
- Femme nue en pied
- Nu à la draperie (Étude)
- Compotier

== 1908 ==
- La dríade (Nu dans une forêt)
- Bols et cruche
- Fermière
- Maison dans le jardin
- Paysage
- Vase de fleurs, verre de vin, et cuillère
- Composition avec tête de mort
- Cinq femmes (Baigneuses dans la forêt)
- Baigneuse nue debout
- Verre et fruits
- Maisonette dans un jardin
- Trois femmes (Étude)
- Trois femmes
- Groupe qui se lève
- Nu couché
- Nu debout
- Femme nue debout tournée vers la droite
- Femme avec éventail (Après le bal)
- Tête d'homme (oil on canvas, 62.2 x 43.5 cm, Metropolitan Museum of Art)
- Tête de femme (Woman's Head)
- Tête
- Femme nue au bord de la mer (Baigneuse)
- Le compotier
- Main et pied
- Nu aux bras levés de profil
- Nu debout de face
- Carnaval au bistrot (Étude)
- Carafon et trois bols
- Poires et pommes
- Compotier aux poires et pommes
- Compotier et fruits
- Femme nue
- Baigneuse
- Nu debout
- Femme nue debout
- Buste de femme
- Trois femmes (version rythmée)
- Trois femmes (Étude)
- L'Offrande (Étude)
- L'Offrande
- Femme nue couchée et trois personnages (Incomplet)
- Nature morte au vase et à l'étoffe verte
- Vase et fruit ('Mort aux rat')
- Deux femmes
- Femme nue de profil
- Odalisque (Ingres)
- Crâne, encrier, marteau
- Crâne, encrier, hareng I
- Crâne, encrier, hareng II
- Femme assise
- Femme nue assise
- Homme assis
- Buste de femme
- Buste de femme accoudée ('Femme dormant')
- Femme nue assise
- Paysage
- Tête
- Nu dans la forêt
- Buste de la fermière
- Tête de femme
- Pot de fleurs
- La driade (Étude)
- Visage-masque
- Nature morte
- Compotiers, fruits et verre
- Poissons et bouteilles
- Homme nu assis (Seated Male Nude)
- Nature morte au bouquet de fleurs
- Paysage, coucher de soleil
- Paysage (Deux arbres)
- Bol vert et flacon noir
- Paysage aux deux figures (Landscape with Two Figures)
- Bols et flacons (Pitcher and Bowls)

== 1909 ==
- Pains et compotier aux fruits sur une table
- Carnaval au bistrot (Étude)
- Deux femmes nues
- La reine Isabeau
- Nature morte aux bouteilles de liqueur
- Femme nue dans un fauteuil
- Femme assise
- Femme avec un livre
- Femme à l'éventail
- Femme à la mandoline (Woman with a Mandolin)
- Femme et un vase de fleurs
- Le bock
- Éventail, boîte de sel et melon
- Buste de femme (Fernande)
- Femme en vert (Buste de femme, Femme assise)
- Baigneurs qui se sèchent
- Femme assise dans un fauteuil
- Tête de femme
- Famille d'Arlequin
- Femme nue assise dans un fauteuil (oil on canvas, 81.3 x 65.4 cm, Metropolitan Museum of Art)
- Homme assis dans un fauteuil
- Brioche et verre
- Tête de femme
- Buste de femme au bouquet (Fernande)
- Femme aux poires (Fernande)
- Femme assise
- Portrait de Manuel Pallarés
- Paysage avec un pont
- Pressoir d'olive à Horta de Sant Joan (L'usine)
- Brick Factory at Tortosa (Briqueterie à Tortosa, L'Usine, Factory at Horta de Ebro)
- Maisons sur la colline (Horta de Ebro)
- Le réservoir (Horta d'Ebre)
- Femme assise
- Pomme
- Femme qui coud
- Le Sacré-Cœur
- Buste de femme (oil on canvas, 727 x 600 mm, Tate)
- Carafe et chandelier
- Tête d'homme
- Tête de femme (Fernande Olivier)
- Tête de femme (Fernande) (Plaster, Unconfirmed size: 405 x 230 x 260 mm, Tate)
- Carnaval au bistrot (Étude)
- Baigneurs dans un paysage
- Nature morte à la chocolatière
- Saint-Antoine et Arlequin
- Femme assise (Femme au châle)
- Le chapeau
- Femme nue assise
- Buste d'Arlequin
- Jeune fille assise
- Maisons et palmiers II
- Paysage avec palmiers II
- Paysage avec palmiers III
- Maisons et palmiers I
- Maisons et palmiers II
- Paysage avec un pont
- Paysage (La montagne de Santa Barbara)
- Buste d'homme (L'athlète)
- Madonne
- Nature morte à la brioche
- La dame au chapeau noir
- Tête de femme (Fernande)
- Nature morte (coffret, compotier, tasse)
- Coffret, compotier, tasse
- Femme nue assise (1909–10) (oil on canvas, 921 x 730 mm, Tate)
- Paysanne assise ('L'Italienne de Derain')
- Pomme
- Autoportrait
- Verre, pomme et livres
- Moulin à Horta d'Ebre
- Homme au chapeau (Portrait de Braque)
- Maisons sur la colline
- Verres et fruits
- Nature morte au cuir à rasoir
- Nature morte aux oignons
- Carafon, pot et compotier
- Vase, gourde et fruits sur une table
- Les poissons
- Le pressoir à huile
- Portrait de Clovis Sagot
- Baigneuse
- Man with Arms Crossed
- The Oil Mill (Moulin à huile)
- Still Life, Casket, Cup, Apples and Glass

== 1910 ==
- Portrait de Daniel-Henry Kahnweiler (oil on canvas, 101.1 x 73.3 cm, Art Institute of Chicago)
- Jeune fille à la mandoline (Fanny Tellier)
- Nature morte avec verre et citron
- Femme à la mandoline
- Vase de fleurs
- Les jumelles
- Le rameur
- Le port de Cadaqués
- Femme nue
- Femme et pot de moutarde
- Femme à la mandoline
- La table de toilette
- Portrait d'Ambroise Vollard
- Portrait de Wilhelm Uhde
- Femme nue debout
- Barque grecque à Cadaqués
- Mademoiselle Léonide
- Femme nue en pied
- Le guitariste
- Nude Woman (oil on canvas, 187.3 x 61 cm, National Gallery of Art, Washington, DC.)
- Femme nue assise
- Tête d'homme
- Mademoiselle Leonie (Étude)
- Composition cubiste
- Barque (Etudes)
- Barque (Etudes) (Nabucodonosor)
- Mademoiselle Léonie (Étude)
- Femme nue dans Cadaqués
- L'encrier
- Le compotier
- Studentin

== Selected works, 1908–1910 ==
Pablo Picasso, 1908, L'amitié (Friendship, Two Nudes), oil on canvas, 151.3 x 101.8 cm, Hermitage Museum

Pablo Picasso, 1908, Trois femmes (Three Women), oil on canvas, 200 x 185 cm, Hermitage Museum, Saint Petersburg

Pablo Picasso, 1908, Paysage aux deux figures (Landscape with Two Figures), oil on canvas, 60 x 73 cm, Musée Picasso, Paris

Pablo Picasso, 1908-09, Poissons et bouteilles, oil on canvas, 73.5 x 60 cm, Lille Métropole Museum of Modern, Contemporary and Outsider Art

Pablo Picasso, 1908, Bols et flacons (Pitcher and Bowls), oil on canvas, 66 x 50.5 cm, Hermitage Museum, Saint Petersburg, Russia

Pablo Picasso, 1909, Nature morte à la brioche

Pablo Picasso, 1909, Maisons à Horta (Houses on the Hill, Horta de Ebro), oil on canvas, 65 x 81 cm, private collection

Pablo Picasso, 1909, The Oil Mill (Moulin à huile), oil on canvas, 38.1 x 45.7 cm (15 x 18 in), Metropolitan Museum of Art

Pablo Picasso, 1909, Still Life, Casket, Cup, Apples and Glass, Bologna Gallery of Modern Art

Pablo Picasso, 1909, Brick Factory at Tortosa (Briqueterie à Tortosa, L'Usine, Factory at Horta de Ebro), oil on canvas. 50.7 x 60.2 cm, (Source entry State Museum of New Western Art, Moscow) Hermitage Museum, Saint Petersburg

Pablo Picasso, 1909, Man with Arms Crossed, watercolor, gouache and charcoal on paper pasted on cardboard, 65.2 x 49.2 cm, Hermitage Museum, St. Petersburg

Pablo Picasso, 1909, Two Nude Figures (Deux figures nues), steel-faced drypoint on Arches laid paper, 13 x 11 cm, printed by Delâtre, Paris, published by Daniel-Henry Kahnweiler

Pablo Picasso, 1909, Nature morte au compotier (Still Life with Fruit Dish), drypoint

Pablo Picasso, 1909, Harlequin (L'arlequin)

Pablo Picasso, 1909, Femme à l'éventail (Woman with a Fan), oil on canvas, 101 x 81 cm, Pushkin Museum, Moscow

Pablo Picasso, 1909, Buste de femme (Femme en vert, Femme assise), oil on canvas, 100.3 x 81.3 cm, Van Abbemuseum, Netherlands. This painting from the collection of Wilhelm Uhde was confiscated by the French state and sold at the Hôtel Drouot in 1921

Pablo Picasso, 1909, Head of a Woman (Tête de femme), oil on canvas, 60.3 x 51.1 cm, The Art Institute of Chicago

Pablo Picasso, Head of a Woman, 1909, gouache on paper, 62.2 x 48 cm, Museum of Modern Art, New York

Pablo Picasso, 1909, Woman with a Mandolin (Femme à la mandoline), oil on canvas, 92 x 73 cm, Hermitage Museum

Pablo Picasso, 1909, Femme assise (Sitzende Frau), oil on canvas, 100 x 80 cm, Staatliche Museen zu Berlin, Neue Nationalgalerie

Pablo Picasso, 1909-10, Figure dans un Fauteuil (Seated Nude, Femme nue assise), oil on canvas, 92.1 x 73 cm, Tate Modern, London. This painting from the collection of Wilhelm Uhde was confiscated by the French state and sold at the Hôtel Drouot in 1921

Pablo Picasso, 1909-10, Le Bock, oil on canvas, 81 x 65.5, Lille Métropole Museum of Modern, Contemporary and Outsider Art

Pablo Picasso, 1910, Woman with Mustard Pot (La Femme au pot de moutarde), oil on canvas, 73 x 60 cm, Gemeentemuseum Den Haag. Exhibited at the Armory Show, New York, Chicago, Boston 1913

Pablo Picasso, c.1910, Studentin, photo Kahnweiler, Paris

Pablo Picasso, 1910, Girl with a Mandolin (Fanny Tellier), oil on canvas, 100.3 x 73.6 cm, Museum of Modern Art, New York

Pablo Picasso, 1910, Portrait of Wilhelm Uhde, oil on canvas, 81 x 60 cm, Joseph Pulitzer Collection
