= Boy Leading a Horse =

Painting by Pablo Picasso

- Artist: Pablo Picasso
- Year: 1905–1906
- Catalogue: 79994
- Medium: Oil on canvas
- Movement: Picasso's Rose Period, Expressionism
- Dimensions: 220.6 cm × 131.2 cm (86.85 in × 51.65 in)
- Location: Museum of Modern Art, New York
- Accession: 575.1964

Jeune garçon au cheval (English: Boy Leading a Horse) is an oil on canvas painting by Pablo Picasso. The painting is housed in the Museum of Modern Art in New York. It was painted in Picasso's Rose Period from 1905 to 1906, when he was still a struggling artist living in Paris. The painting is a study for a much larger composition that Picasso never completed.

== Background ==
When Picasso created Boy Leading a Horse, he was an impoverished bohemian artist who was living in Rue Ravignan in the Montmartre area of Paris. Alongside his fellow artists, he lived in a dilapidated building known as Le Bateau-Lavoir. Picasso had begun a more positive period of his life, which is now known as his Rose Period, which is distinct from his earlier, more pessimistic Blue Period.

== Description ==
Boy Leading a Horse depicts a nude, unmounted figure leading a horse. The horse has no reins, so the boy's clenched fist is used to instruct the horse to move forward. Picasso created this work in subdued shades of brown and grey and with very few details.

Picasso had planned to create a grand composition on a very large scale, which would have featured the boy from this painting leading the horse by its bridle alongside several mounted riders located around a watering place. Several studies for the complete composition exist which depict other figures that were intended for the composition, in addition to a gouache, a watercolour, a drawing and a drypoint. Several drawings also show various stages in the development of the scene in this painting. The large composition, titled The Watering Place, had been inspired by the work of the French Neoclassical artist Ingres, whose works had been displayed at the Salon d'Automne in 1905. However, Picasso eventually abandoned the composition, leaving Boy Leading a Horse as the remaining work. A preparatory sketch of the final composition can be viewed at the Metropolitan Museum of Art, titled The Watering Place, which shows how the work would have appeared when finished. The sketch illustrates several nude adolescents who are washing and watering their horses against a mountainous landscape.

== Influences ==
In his early years as an artist, Picasso was greatly inspired by the work of El Greco, particularly in terms of the colours that he used and the depiction of his figures. El Greco's Saint Martin Sharing his Coat with a Poor Man (1597-1599), which also includes a depiction of a horse and a servant, is very different to Boy Leading a Horse yet possesses similar elements.

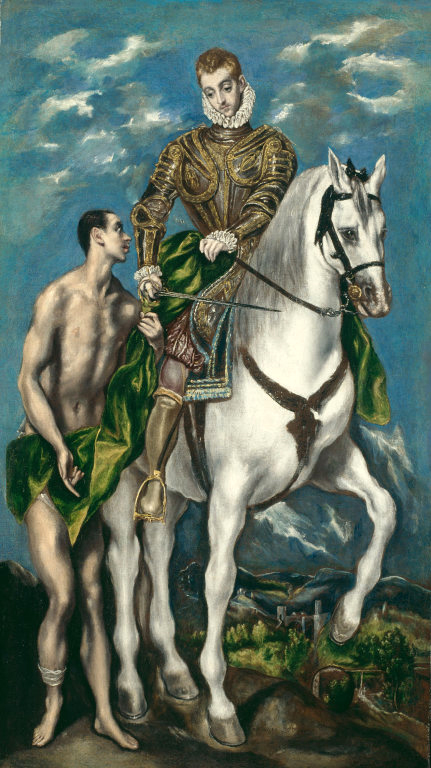
El Greco, Saint Martin and the Beggar, c. 1597–1600, Art Institute of Chicago

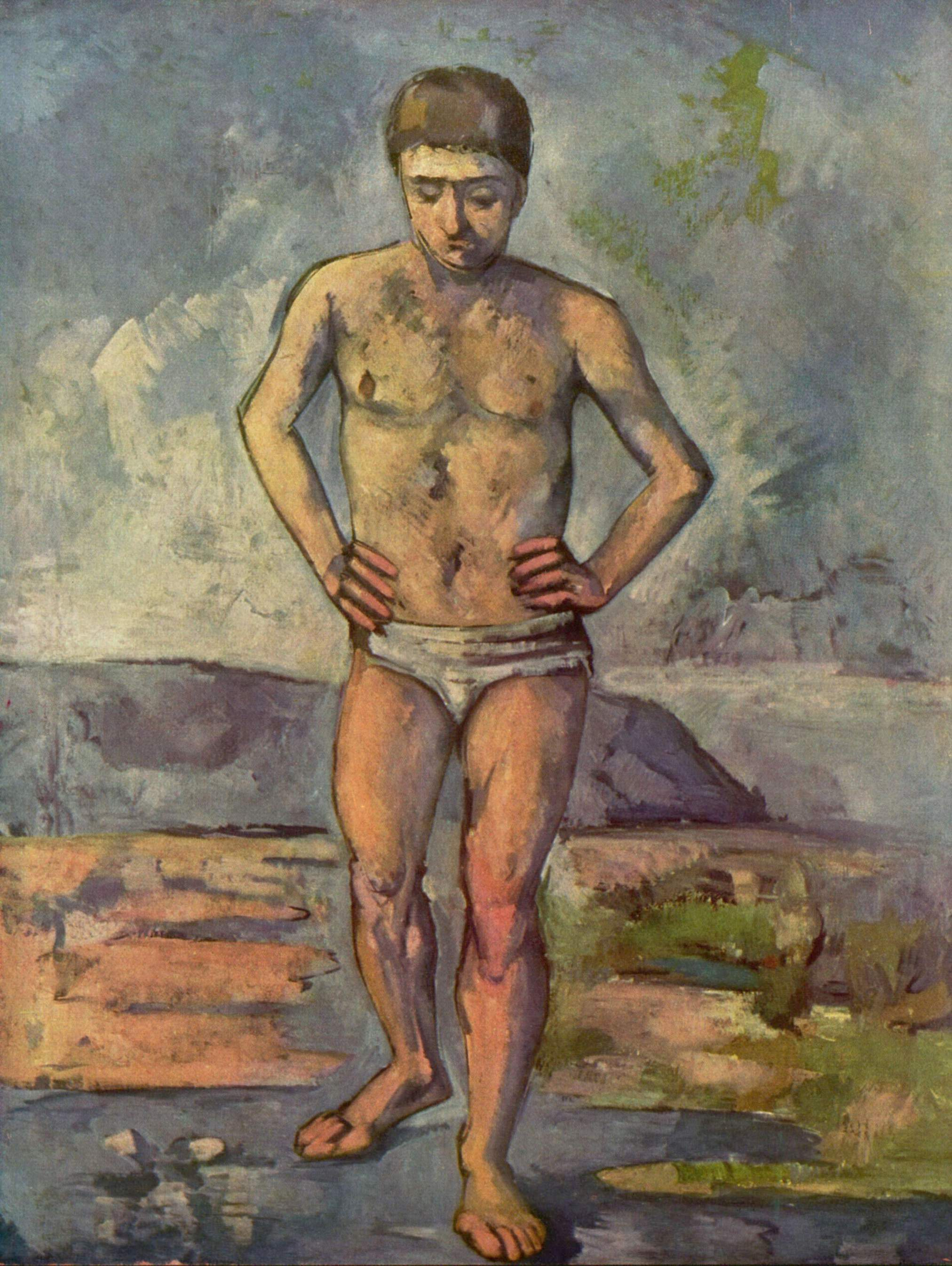
Paul Cézanne, Bather, 1885–1887, Museum of Modern Art, formerly collection Lillie P. Bliss

== Provenance ==
The painting was first owned by the influential art dealer Ambroise Vollard. It was then acquired by the art collectors Gertrude Stein and Leo Stein, around 1907 to 1913. Paul von Mendelssohn-Bartholdy acquired it in 1934 or 1935. Mendelssohn-Bartholdy sold the work before his death to the Jewish art gallery of Justin Thannhauser. Thannhauser fled Germany and spent most of the war living in Switzerland. He then sold the painting to former chairman of the Museum of Modern Art William S. Paley in 1936. Paley gifted the work to the Museum of Modern Art in 1964.

== Lawsuit ==
Julius Schoeps, Director of the Moses Mendelssohn Center for European-Jewish Studies at the University of Potsdam, as speaker for the Mendelssohn-Bartholdy family, sued the Museum of Modern Art in 2007 for the painting. Jed S. Rakoff ruled that Paul von Mendelssohn-Bartholdy had been forced to sell the painting by the Nazi Party. The dispute was settled out of court in February 2009, with the museum retaining the work.

== In other media ==
In Vladimir Nabokov's 1962 novel Pale Fire, Professor Kinbote says he placed in his lodging-house "the reproduction of a beloved early Picasso: earth boy leading raincloud horse".

== See also ==
- Picasso's Rose Period
- Picasso's Blue Period
- List of Picasso artworks 1901–1910
- Garçon à la pipe
- Young Girl with a Flower Basket
