= Head of a Young Woman =

Painting by Pablo Picasso

- Artist: Pablo Picasso
- Year: 1906
- Medium: Oil painting
- Movement: Rose Period
- Dimensions: 54 cm × 42 cm (21 in × 17 in)
- Location: Museo Nacional Centro de Arte Reina Sofía; Madrid

Head of a Young Woman is a 1906 oil painting by Pablo Picasso. It depicts the portrait of a young woman with long, dark hair. The painting dates from Picasso's Rose Period, during a trip that he made to the Catalan village of Gósol. It was owned by Spanish banker Jaime Botín until it was seized by the Spanish state in 2015. It is now housed at the Museo Nacional Centro de Arte Reina Sofía, in Madrid.

== Background ==
This painting dates from an important period in Picasso's development as an artist, known as his Gósol period. In June 1906, he made a short trip to the Catalan village of Gósol and stayed there for 10 weeks with his mistress Fernande Olivier. Within this period, while escaping from the Parisian art world, he dramatically changed his approach to his art. During his stay at Gósol, he produced a large quantity of works, including paintings, drawings, watercolours, gouaches, and carvings. Picasso was particularly inspired by the simplicity of Catalan Romanesque art. Elizabeth Cowling, curator of a Picasso exhibition at the National Portrait Gallery, considered the trip to be of great importance, saying that it was, "the break that gave him the opportunity to absorb sources he'd recently discovered more fully and develop ideas and themes outside the competitive environment of a major city. And being such a backwater – so unmodernised – it must have reinforced his well-established penchant for the primitive."

Gósol marks a major change in Picasso's artwork, as his paintings became much more simplified in form. Upon returning to Paris, he focused his attention on depicting the female body, using basic interlaced shapes and an ochre palette. This experimental approach featured the gradual emergence of geometric shapes in his works that would eventually be defined as Cubism.

== Description ==
Head of a Young Woman was painted in 1906 by Picasso when he was 24 years old. It is an example of a period of his early works in the 1900s that is known as his Rose Period. The oil painting is a portrait of a young woman with long, dark hair and a sideways stare and has an estimated value of €26 million.

== Smuggling case ==
August 2015 video detailing the recovering of the painting. (in Spanish)

In January 2020, Spanish billionaire Jaime Botín was convicted of attempting to smuggle Head of a Young Woman out of Spain. He was sentenced to 18 months in prison and ordered to pay a fine of $58 million. Although he was the owner of the painting, it was considered to be a work of national importance and he was not permitted to remove it from the country. The painting had been discovered on board Botín's luxury yacht by French authorities off the island of Corsica in 2015. Evidence presented at the court case showed that Botín had attempted to sell the painting in 2012, by authorising Christie's auction house to seek an export permit from Madrid, but this had been denied. In 2015, the painting was transferred to his yacht in Valencia. When police inspected the yacht in 2015, the captain had omitted the painting from the artworks that were listed on board. Botín had commissioned a private jet to transport the painting to Geneva. Ownership of the painting was transferred to the Spanish state by court order. The painting is now located at the Museo Nacional Centro de Arte Reina Sofía in Madrid.

== Significance and legacy ==
Spanish experts have stated that the painting is "one of the few made by the painter in his so-called Gósol period where Picasso is clearly influenced by the fabric of Iberian art …that had a decisive influence, not only on cubism, but also on the subsequent evolution of the painting of the 20th century".

== Provenance ==
Botín acquired Head of a Young Woman at the Marlborough Fine Arts Fair in London in 1977.

The painting was seized by French customs agents on 31 July 2015 and it was then transferred to Reina Sofia Museum in Madrid for protection. Ownership of the painting has now been transferred to the Spanish state.

== See also ==
- Portrait of Gertrude Stein
- Young Girl with a Flower Basket
- Picasso's Rose Period
- List of Picasso artworks 1901–1910
- 1906 in art
