= Girl in a Chemise =

Painting by Pablo Picasso

- Artist: Pablo Picasso
- Year: c.1905
- Medium: oil on canvas
- Dimensions: 72.7 cm × 60 cm (28.6 in × 24 in)
- Location: Tate

Girl in a Chemise (French: Jeune femme en chemise) is an oil-on-canvas painting created c. 1905 by Pablo Picasso. It is a portrait of a girl, whom experts believe to be Madeleine, Picasso's girlfriend during this period. Stylistically, the painting belongs to Picasso's Rose Period, although it is predominantly blue in tone. The painting is particularly remarkable for the presence of an earlier portrait of a young boy hidden beneath the surface, which Picasso transformed into the girl by making some subtle changes. The portrait has been housed in the collection of the Tate since 1933.

== Background ==
Picasso painted Girl in a Chemise sometime around 1905, at a point when his artwork was going through a transitional phase. By 1904, he had settled in Paris following an ambition to discover new inspirations and develop his art. Since 1901, the young artist had been living in poverty and suffered from intense isolation. The years 1901 to 1904 are now known as his Blue Period, which was categorised by a dominant use of blue shades in his paintings and a preoccupation with the most impoverished and deprived social groups, such as beggars, drunks and prostitutes. By the spring of 1904, Picasso's artwork had taken a more optimistic tone, reflected in a more rosy palette and cheerful subject matter. This new period would later be known as his Rose Period.

== Description ==
Girl in a Chemise is the portrait of a girl wearing a white chemise. It is an oil painting on canvas measuring 72.7 cm x 60 cm and is signed and dated Picasso '05' on the lower left corner. The date of the painting remains unclear as Picasso's art dealer Daniel-Henry Kahnweiler disputed the date in a letter to the Tate Gallery in 1953. Art historians generally believe that it was begun in 1904 and was signed by Picasso earlier than when it was dated in 1905.

The portrait is one of Picasso's earliest paintings upon settling in Paris in 1904. Although the painting is predominantly blue in tone, it belongs in style to his Rose Period. The transition between the two phases is evident in the warm tones of pink and brown that can be seen in the background.

The identity of the subject has been a source of discussion. It has been suggested that the girl is a hybrid of several of Picasso's models. Kahnweiler dismissed speculation that the girl was Fernande Olivier, Picasso's partner who was living with him during this period. He said, "Picasso did not know Fernande Olivier when he painted this picture. The model was the woman with whom he was living then, before Fernande Olivier. I do not remember her name and I think it would be of no use mentioning it; Picasso, I am sure, would not like it".

John Richardson, Picasso's biographer opined that the woman depicted in the painting was Madeleine, Picasso's former girlfriend. Art historians know little about her, except that she became pregnant and had an abortion. Richardson remarked, "A new face in his work reveals that Picasso had found a new mistress. Madeleine she was called; all we know is that she was a model... she was pretty in a delicate, bird-like way (her nose and forehead formed a straight line). Madeleine's thick hair, loosely drawn back into a chignon, and her boyishly lean body recurs in a number of works done over the next six to nine months – works that mirror the blurring of the Blue into the Rose period". Picasso's relationship with Madeleine overlapped with a new romantic interest in the form of Fernande Olivier, whom he met in August 1904. However, Richardson opined that, "it is Madeleine's skinny beauty that continues to haunt the work – at least until Spring 1905".

== Hidden painting ==
X-radiography has revealed an earlier painting of a young boy beneath the surface of the existing painting. The hidden painting depicts a young boy with a pleated white collar, short cropped hair, who may be wearing a skull cap. Researchers have considered the earlier painting to be an image of a saltimbanque, or travelling circus performer, dressed in a costume that is similar to a Pierrot. Experts believe that Picasso was portraying an urchin, rather than a fictional character, due to his appearance. Travelling circus groups were a popular form of entertainment during this period and a subject matter with which Picasso was familiar. The finished painting of the girl wearing a chemise is so thinly painted on top of the original image of the young boy, that it gives an androgynous aspect to the portrait. The date when Picasso changed the subject of the painting from a boy to a girl remains unknown. The Tate has particularly remarked on the "masterful way in which Picasso has transformed the male subject into a female portrait with a minimum of paint". The x-radiograph also revealed other hidden lines and shapes beneath the surface of the existing painting, which suggest that Picasso had reused the canvas after removing a previous work prior to painting the boy.

== Painting techniques ==
Further analysis of the painting has revealed Picasso's experimental painting techniques within the composition. He used oil paint to imitate the matte finish of gouache by working at the canvas to reveal varying tones in the painting. These variations of pigments are visible in the crevices of the painting on a microscopic scale. Varying tones can be detected beneath the black surface, including hints of blue, pink and brown. After creating the thin layer for the background, Picasso applied additional layers of thicker paint to the subject's face and figure. This was then scored with vertical lines to create a rough texture.

== Transformation of the subject ==
The painting of the saltimbanque boy was transformed into the girl with some subtle changes, such as the elongation of the head and the addition of a chignon. The outline of the head and face was redefined by a line of ultramarine blue. Picasso made the neck longer and created a more feminine chin by rounding the shape and adding a deeper indentation below the mouth. The lips were also altered and coloured vermillion red. The feminine nature of the subject was enhanced by placing the blue background against complementary shades of brown. The nose of the girl was made sharper and more prominent and the ear was more defined. The eye was also shaped to appear more feminine. Picasso scraped areas of the paint near the nose and in the eyelid to reveal a blue layer, thus creating a more haunting atmosphere. The torso was created using a layer of dark underpaint, covered with thin layers of skin colour and pale blue, which was then overpainted with thick lines of white for the chemise. The washy blue background was created using Prussian blue and diluted black paint, which was then brushed over the scraped surface and then dripped with solvent or diluted paint to expose other colours beneath the surface.

== Provenance ==
The painting was bequeathed to the Tate by C. Frank Stoop in 1933.

== Significance and legacy ==
The Tate paper notes that Girl in a Chemise is a precursor to the great saltimbanque paintings that he created during his Rose Period. The paper also summarises the significance of the painting in Picasso's early life and career.

Seen in the context of Picasso's career this painting is considered one of his early works, but the technical accomplishment and the creativity of the artist are fully evident by this period. His limited palette was masterfully deployed, his very physical engagement with the painting process evident in the scraping and scoring of the paint, the juxtaposition of opaque matte colours and washes of transparent colour combining to produce this small but significant painting at a key transitional moment in his career.

== See also ==
- Famille d'acrobates avec singe
- Family of Saltimbanques
- Girl on a Ball
