= Famille d'acrobates avec singe =

Painting by Pablo Picasso

- Artist: Pablo Picasso
- Year: 1905
- Medium: Mixed media
- Movement: Picasso's Rose Period
- Dimensions: 104 cm × 75 cm (41 in × 30 in)
- Location: Gothenburg Museum of Art

Famille d'acrobates avec singe (English: Family of acrobats with monkey) is a 1905 painting by Pablo Picasso. It depicts a family of travelling circus performers during an intimate moment. The work was produced on cardboard using mixed media: gouache, watercolour, pastel and Indian ink. It is held by the Gothenburg Museum of Art in Gothenburg, Sweden. The work was painted at a key phase in Picasso's life, as he made the transition from an impoverished bohemian at the start of 1905 to a successful artist by the end of 1906.

== Background ==
After achieving some early success in 1901, Picasso was still struggling by 1905, living in penury in Montmartre. The work was painted at a studio that he took on the top floor of the dilapidated building at 13 rue Ravignan, which the poet Max Jacob termed the "Le Bateau-Lavoir". The other floors were occupied by other artists, making it a hub of artistic activity. The Cirque Médrano was nearby, and Picasso was inspired by the harlequins and saltimbanques, clowns, jugglers and other acts, making the transition from his melancholy Blue Period to his more optimistic Rose Period.

Picasso was particularly interested in the life of the saltimbanque during this period. He created several works that depicted circus performers, typically in family groups. This is evident in his gouache and ink work titled Famille D'arlequin (1905) and the monumental oil on canvas Famille de saltimbanques (1905). Picasso saw a form of human suffering in the lives of the circus performers, and portrayed them as figures of loneliness. However, in some of his works, he also depicted them as warm, intimate family groups.

The woman holding the child in this painting may have been Picasso's girlfriend, Madeleine, with whom he was living from the end of spring 1904. She was named as the model for another Picasso work from this period titled Girl in a Chemise (c.1905) by Picasso's biographer Pierre Daix. Picasso expert John Richardson stated that Madeleine had become pregnant and had an abortion. It was suggested by Richardson that the woman depicted in Famille d'acrobates avec singe had similar features to Madeleine and was depicted at the same time that she would have given birth. This painting may therefore reflect Picasso's mixture of guilt relating to the abortion and his longing for a child.

== Description ==
The painting is a mixed media composition on cardboard that measures 104 cm × 75 cm (41 in × 30 in). It is signed "Picasso" and on the rear "P 1905". The image depicts a young family of circus performers in the midst of an intimate moment. To the left is the father, a thin male acrobat wearing a tight pink harlequin outfit with a bicorn hat. He is sitting on a drum next to the mother wearing a blue dress. They are both looking at a young boy who is being held by the woman. Lower down and further to the right is a baboon, which is looking up at the family. The figures are circus performers, who are resting off stage between acts. There are splashes of greens and blues in the background, and red on the floor, which is perhaps part of a circus tent. The man's orange bicorn hat is unpainted and the colour of the cardboard background. The figures are arranged in a pyramidal composition, based on classical images of the Holy Family. It is an image of hope, conveyed by the child in the mother's arms.

During this period, Picasso decided to push the boundaries of his art with different media. He experimented with oil paints, but also with drawing, pastels and painting with gouache, as is evident by the use of mixed media in this work.

== Conservation ==
Due to Picasso's use of cardboard in this artwork, Famille d'acrobates avec singe has been the focus of an ongoing conservation project to study the condition of the work and also to understand Picasso's technique and materials. Picasso often made use of cardboard for his 1905 works, due to his poor financial condition, as it was cheaper than other media. However, this choice has had an impact on the condition of the work, resulting in the cardboard becoming fragile and requiring ongoing conservation work.

== Provenance ==
Picasso sold the painting to the Galerie du Vingtième Siècle run by art dealer Clovis Sagot near the gallery of Ambroise Vollard. It was the first of three Rose Period paintings acquired by the collectors Gertrude Stein and Leo Stein. The Stein siblings had been living in Paris from 1903, and began collecting contemporary artworks in 1904, buying works by Cézanne, Gauguin and Renoir from Ambroise Vollard. Sagot sold Picasso's Famille d'acrobates avec singe to Leo Stein in autumn 1905. The work arrived in Sweden via the Norwegian art dealer Walther Halvorsen and then reached Gothenburg thanks to the art collector Conrad Pineus. It was bought by the Gothenburg Museum of Art in 1922.

== Similar works by Picasso ==
Girl on a Ball or Young Acrobat on a Ball), Pushkin Museum, Moscow

Acrobat and Young Harlequin, Barnes Foundation

Family of Saltimbanques, National Gallery of Art, Washington D.C.

== See also ==
- Family of Saltimbanques
- Acrobat and Young Harlequin
- Young Girl with a Flower Basket
- Portrait of Gertrude Stein
- Girl in a Chemise

== Resources ==
- Family of Acrobats with Monkey, OVO video
