= Girl on a Ball =

1905 painting by Pablo Picasso

- Young Acrobat on a Ball
- Artist: Pablo Picasso
- Year: 1905
- Medium: Oil on canvas
- Movement: Picasso's Rose Period
- Dimensions: 147 cm × 95 cm (58 in × 37 in)
- Location: Pushkin Museum, Moscow

Girl on a Ball or Young Acrobat on a Ball is a 1905 oil on canvas painting by Pablo Picasso, which he produced during his Rose Period. It depicts a group of travelling circus performers during a rehearsal, with a primary focus on two contrasting figures. It has been housed in the collection of the Pushkin Museum in Moscow since 1948.

== Background ==
Picasso created Girl on a Ball in 1905 during his Rose Period, at a time when he was living at the dilapidated Bateau-Lavoir in the Montmartre area of Paris. Following on from his bleak Blue Period, Picasso's work now displayed softer, warmer tones, which are evident in this painting.

From late 1904 to early 1905, Picasso focused his works on a single motif about the life of a travelling circus that he developed for a large composition at the end of 1904. This era was also known as his Circus Period or Saltimbanque Period. In the second half of 1905, Picasso produced The Family of Saltimbanques, which originally featured a young acrobat balancing on a ball. This central motif was continued in Girl on a Ball just a few months later.

== Description ==
The painting depicts travelling circus artists in the process of a rehearsal. The scene focuses on a young girl gracefully balancing on a ball to the left of the composition, while to the right, a powerful athlete is sitting on a cube. The Pushkin Museum states that, "The artist is reflecting not so much on the fate of people in the arts, as on the universal laws of balance and interaction, harmony and contrast."

In this painting Picasso displays a group of people who are outcasts, but connected by each other. This is reflected in the contrast and balance of the two main subjects. The girl balancing on the ball appears fragile, which contrasts with the strength and large figure of the seated man. There appears to be a geometry and natural grace within the composition. The figure of the girl has been described as an embodiment of the transient dream of life, with the man's power protecting her from the cruelty of reality. By using ash pink and blue shades for both the figures and the background, Picasso conveyed the emotional state of the circus artists, suggesting that they are immersed in their own world.

The direct relationship between the two figures can be noted in various details in the painting. The sharp angle of the man's left leg mirrors the left arm of the girl. The blue hue of his shorts reflects the pale blue tones of the girl's leotard. The red flower clipped to her hair balances with the warm hues of the man's shirt and tights.

To emphasise the contrast between the two figures, Picasso ignored reality and instead exaggerated the features of the painting. He chose to distort the proportions of the composition, such as depicting the man as a colossus.

== Significance and legacy ==
In Pablo Picasso (1881–1973) the authors remark on the significance of the painting's composition.

In this painting from the first half of 1905, the issue of form is still in its genesis, but its magnitude, complexity, and potential can already be sensed. That is why the Young Acrobat on a Ball stands out among Picasso's creations as the seed of many further developments in the area of plastic form and imagery.

== Provenance ==
Ivan Morozov acquired the painting from the gallery of Daniel-Henry Kahnweiler in Paris in 1913. Prior to this, it was owned by Leo and Gertrude Stein. In 1918, after the Russian Revolution, the collection of Morozov was nationalized by the state and housed in the Museum of Modern Western Painting. When the Museum of Modern Western Painting was dissolved after World War II, the collection was transferred in 1948 to the Pushkin Museum.

== References in other works ==
The painting was the inspiration for a short program performance by Russian figure skater Kamila Valieva at both the 2018–2019 season and 2019–2020 season, the latter of which she won the 2020 World Junior Figure Skating Championships.

== See also ==
- Acrobat and Young Harlequin
- Family of Saltimbanques
- Famille d'acrobates avec singe
- Girl in a Chemise
