= The Actor (painting) =

Painting by Pablo Picasso

- Artist: Pablo Picasso
- Year: 1904
- Medium: oil paint, canvas
- Movement: Picasso's Rose Period
- Dimensions: 196 cm (77 in) × 115 cm (45 in)
- Location: Metropolitan Museum of Art
- Owner: Paul Friedrich Leffmann, Hugo Perls, Paul Rosenberg, Thelma Chrysler Foy
- Website: www.metmuseum.org/art/collection/search/488690

The Actor (French: L'acteur) is an oil-on-canvas painting by Spanish painter Pablo Picasso, created from 1904 to 1905. The painting dates from the artist's Rose Period. It is housed in the collection of the Metropolitan Museum of Art in New York City.

== Background ==
From 1901 until 1904, Picasso's work had been dominated by his melancholy Blue Period, which was defined by predominantly blue paintings of human suffering. The Actor illustrates a shift in Picasso's artistic approach, which was influenced by his meeting of his new partner, Fernande Olivier in 1904. Olivier's presence and influence on the tone, subject matter and palette of Picasso's artwork is notable in the sheet of studies that he created for The Actor around the time of New Year's Eve in 1904, which features two profiles of Olivier.

== Description ==
Picasso painted The Actor during the winter of 1904 to 1905 when he was 23 years old. The painting is a work of the artist's Rose Period when he changed his painting style from the downbeat tones of his Blue Period to warmer and more romantic hues. It portrays an acrobat in a dramatic pose with an abstract design in the background. The canvas measures 196 centimetres (77 in) by 115 centimetres (45 in). Picasso painted The Actor on the reverse side of a landscape painting by another artist because he could not afford new canvases at the time.

== Significance and legacy ==
The Actor was produced at a transitional point in Picasso's artwork, when he became inspired by the lives of harlequins and saltimbanques. The Metropolitan Museum of Art summarises the importance of this painting in relation to his subsequent works about travelling circus performers.

Simple yet haunting, The Actor is the work with which Picasso ended his obsession with the wretched in favor of the theatrical world of acrobats and saltimbanques. Although the attenuated figure and extraordinary play of hands recall the El Greco-inspired mannerism of the Blue Period, The Actor can be seen as the prologue to the series of works that culminates in the enormous canvas Family of Saltimbanques.

== Ownership, legal case, and value ==
By 1912 The Actor was owned by Paul Friedrich Leffmann, of Cologne, Germany who lent the painting to the Sonderbund exhibition in May 1912 in Cologne, before hanging it in the dining room of their Villa. In 1933, with Adolf Hitler's rise to power the conditions for Jews in Germany worsened. The Leffmanns, a German Jewish couple, suffered the Aryanization of their home and businesses by the Nazis. The couple fled Germany in 1937 to Italy, and in 1938 to Switzerland and then to Brazil. The Leffmanns sold the painting in June 1938, for $13,200, to art dealers Paul Rosenberg and Hugo Perls, to fund their escape from the Nazis. The painting eventually was purchased in 1941 by heiress Thelma Chrysler Foy, the daughter of Walter Chrysler of the Chrysler automobile company, from the Knoedler gallery in New York, for $22,500. She donated it to the Metropolitan Museum of Art in New York City, in 1952, where it has since been displayed.

In 2016, the heir of the Leffmanns sued the Metropolitan Museum of Art in U.S. federal court, seeking the return of the painting on the ground that the Leffmans had sold it under duress. In 2018, Judge Loretta A. Preska of the U.S. District Court for the Southern District of New York ruled in favor of the Met, ruling that the plaintiff could not show, under New York law, that the painting was sold under duress. The U.S. Court of Appeals for the Second Circuit affirmed the dismissal on the technical grounds that the claim was raised too late (72 years after the work was sold and 58 years after it was donated to the art museum). The use of a technical defense by the museum was controversial and cited in the passage of a new restitution law in 2025 and 2026.

In 2010, experts estimated that the painting, which is one of the largest from Picasso's Rose Period, is worth more than US$100 million.

== Damage ==
The Actor was damaged on January 25, 2010, when a woman attending an art class at The Metropolitan Museum of Art stumbled and fell into the painting, creating a rip of about 15 centimetres (5.9 in) in height in the lower right corner. The museum stated that the rip did not affect the artwork's central subject, and that they intended to have the painting repaired in a few weeks by performing "unobtrusive" work. This was in preparation for an April 27 retrospective of roughly 250 of the artist's works.

== See also ==
- Le Rêve
- Acrobat and Young Harlequin
- Family of Saltimbanques
- Girl on a Ball
