= Girl from Majorca =

Gouache by Pablo Picasso

Girl from Majorca is a 1905 gouache on card sketch by Pablo Picasso. It is held now in the Pushkin Museum, in Moscow. It is a study for the slightly later Family of Saltimbanques.
