= Young Girl with a Flower Basket =

Painting by Pablo Picasso

- Artist: Pablo Picasso
- Year: 1905
- Medium: Oil on canvas
- Movement: Rose Period
- Dimensions: 154.8 cm × 66.1 cm (60.9 in × 26.0 in)
- Location: Private collection, New York

Young Girl with a Flower Basket (French: Fillette à la corbeille fleurie or Jeune fille nue avec panier de fleurs or Fillette nue au panier de fleurs or Le panier fleuri) is a 1905 oil on canvas painting by Pablo Picasso from his Rose Period. The painting depicts a Parisian street girl, named "Linda", whose fate is unknown. It was painted at a key phase in Picasso's life, as he made the transition from an impoverished bohemian at the start of 1905 to a successful artist by the end of 1906. The painting is listed as one of the most expensive paintings, after achieving a price of $115 million when it was sold at Christie's to the Nahmad Collection on 8 May 2018. It is currently the fourth highest-selling painting by Picasso.

== Background ==
After achieving some early success in 1901, Picasso was still a struggling artist by 1905, living in penury in Montmartre. The work was painted at the new studio that he took on the top floor of the dilapidated building at 13 rue Ravignan, which the poet Max Jacob termed "Le Bateau-Lavoir". The Cirque Médrano was situated nearby at the foot of Montmartre, and Picasso was inspired by the harlequins and saltimbanques, clowns, jugglers and other acts, making the transition from his bleak Blue Period to his more optimistic Rose Period.

Young Girl with a Flower Basket was created in the autumn of 1905 after Picasso returned to Paris from spending six weeks painting in the countryside in Holland. The experience of his Dutch trip was also coupled with a renewed Parisian interest in classical art, which had a great influence on Picasso's work during that year. The art historian Alfred H. Barr, Jr. remarked on the influence of classicism on Picasso during this period.

During the second half of the year [Picasso’s] work began to assume a classic breadth and repose. Such paintings…reveal the new style, more objective in feeling, more studied in pose, broadly and more solidly modeled, simpler in color. Picasso’s youthful classicism is informal, fresh, unacademic... During this brief moment in his youth he was able to hold in delicate, intuitive balance the human and the ideal, the personal and the traditional.

Later in 1905, Henri-Pierre Roché introduced Picasso to the collectors Gertrude and Leo Stein and they became friends, buying Femme au bras levé (1905) directly from the artist. Picasso completed Portrait of Gertrude Stein in 1906. The acquisitions by the Steins were to mark the beginnings of Picasso's commercial success, and by the end of 1906, his works were being bought by the influential art dealer Ambroise Vollard.

== Description ==
The subject of the painting is a young girl who was working as a flower seller, but also probably as a teenage child prostitute. She is depicted naked, save for pink ribbons in her dark hair and a necklace, and she is holding a basket of red flowers, all painted with simplified lines and flattened blocks of colour. Her silhouette against the blue background appears awkward and her expression is troubled. The painting is signed "Picasso" on the upper right corner, and again signed, dated and inscribed "Picasso 1905 13 Rue Ravignan" on the reverse. It measures 154.8 cm × 66.1 cm (60.9 in × 26.0 in).

According to Christie's, Picasso referred to the girl as "Linda", which translates as "pretty", which could have been a nickname. Her identity and life story remain a mystery. It was reported by John Richardson in his exhibition catalogue for the Late Picasso exhibition at the Tate Gallery in London in 1988 (p. 340), based on the writings of Jean-Paul Crespelle, that the subject was called "Linda la Bouquetière", from the Place du Tertre, and she worked outside the Moulin Rouge. She also worked as an artist's model; in addition to Picasso, she was painted by Kees van Dongen and Amedeo Modigliani.

Picasso's painting of "Linda" displays elements of Egyptian art and classicism. Picasso was greatly inspired by the work of the French Neoclassical painter Ingres. This influence can be seen in the awkward side silhouette of the girl, which is reminiscent of ancient Egyptian art. However, the portrait of the girl is realistic rather than an idealised image of a goddess. Her figure is conveyed using simple curves and minimal detail, yet her face is given a more realistic expression.

Many of Picasso's paintings of this period combine conflicting elements of innocence and experience. In Young Girl with a Flower Basket, the stark contrast between the whiteness of the child's skin and the bright red colour of the flowers in her basket has been considered to be a juxtaposition of chastity and sexuality and of innocence and corruption. Picasso's classical rendering of "Linda" was designed to convey an aura of purity that contrasts starkly with the harsh reality of her existence. An earlier pen and ink sketch suggests Picasso originally planned to paint the girl in a white dress, as if attending her first communion, with the red flowers symbolising the blood of the Eucharist. This theme is also exhibited in Garçon à la pipe, the subject of which was described by Picasso as an "evil angel". Like Linda's basket of red flowers, he wears a garland of roses to symbolise the blood of the Eucharist. Both paintings describe the transition from youth to maturity and innocence to experience.

== Significance and legacy ==
Young Girl with a Flower Basket has been described as a "masterpiece, depicting a statuesque nude with a melancholy expression". The art historian John Richardson described the subject as a "sultry looking gamin", while the painting's former owner, Gertrude Stein complained that the girl has "feet like a monkey".

Gertrude eventually learned to appreciate the painting, describing it in 1909 as, "a solid thing, a charming thing, a lovely thing, a perplexing thing, a disconcerting thing, a simple thing, a clear thing, a complicated thing, an interesting thing, a disturbing thing, a repellent thing, a very pretty thing."

Marc Porter, Chairman of Christie’s America, summarised the painting's significance and legacy.

Picasso, the greatest artist of the 20th century, saw our future in 1905 when he painted Fillette à la corbeille fleurie. She represents the themes that Picasso would wrestle with for his life — love, sex, beauty, tenderness, violence — and all that defines humanity. In this masterpiece, Picasso reveals his singular brilliance in a timeless, mesmerising goddess gazing on the universe.

== Provenance ==
Picasso sold the painting to the Galerie du Vingtième Siècle run by art dealer Clovis Sagot near the gallery of Ambroise Vollard. Sagot drove a hard bargain. He originally offered 700 francs for three works – this painting and two works in gouache made in the Netherlands. Picasso initially refused, but desperate for money he returned to take up Sagot's offer a few days later. Sagot cannily cut his offer to 500 francs, which Picasso also refused. Forced by his poverty to return to Sagot again some days later, the work was eventually sold for just 75 francs, and put up for sale in Sagot's gallery as La fleur du pavé ("The flower of the cobblestones").

It became the second of three Rose period paintings acquired by the collectors Gertrude Stein and Leo Stein. The Stein siblings had been living in Paris since 1903 and began collecting contemporary artworks in 1904, buying works by Cézanne, Gauguin and Renoir from Ambroise Vollard. Sagot sold Picasso's Famille d'acrobates avec singe (1905) to Leo Stein, and the couple later acquired Fillette à la corbeille fleurie. The Steins quarrelled about this second purchase, as Leo wanted it but Gertrude did not; in the end, Gertrude relented and they bought it for 150 francs. In time, Gertrude came to appreciate the painting and later acquired Leo's share. In 1938, Gertrude Stein wrote that it "was painted at the great moment of the harlequin period, full of grace and delicacy and charm".

After Gertrude Stein died, the painting was retained by her estate, and then sold in 1968 to the Syndicate of the Museum of Modern Art in New York, but quickly resold later that year to David Rockefeller and Peggy Rockefeller. After David Rockefeller's death in 2017, it was sold at Christie's on 8 May 2018 to the Nahmad family, achieving a sale price of $115 million.

== Other paintings from Picasso’s Rose Period ==
Famille d'acrobates avec singe, 1905, Göteborgs Konstmuseum

Portrait of Gertrude Stein, 1906, Metropolitan Museum of Art

== See also ==
- List of most expensive paintings
- Picasso’s Rose Period
- Picasso’s Blue Period
- Nude (art)
- List of Picasso artworks 1901–1910
