= Portrait of Gertrude Stein =

Painting by Pablo Picasso

- Artist: Pablo Picasso
- Year: 1905–06
- Medium: Oil on canvas
- Movement: Rose Period
- Dimensions: 100 cm × 81.3 cm (39 in × 32.0 in)
- Location: Metropolitan Museum of Art, New York City

Portrait of Gertrude Stein (French: Portrait de Gertrude Stein) is an oil-on-canvas painting of the American writer and art collector Gertrude Stein by Pablo Picasso, which was begun in 1905 and finished the following year. The painting is housed in the Metropolitan Museum of Art in New York. It is considered one of the important works of Picasso's Rose Period. The portrait has historical significance, due to the subject's role in Picasso's early life as a struggling artist and eventual commercial success. It also represents a significant transitional step in the artist's move towards Cubism.

== Background ==
After putting aside the pessimistic themes of his Blue Period, Picasso had begun a new, more optimistic phase in early 1905, which is now known as his Rose Period. The previous year, Picasso had arrived in Paris from Barcelona to settle there. During this time, Picasso was living in poverty in a dilapidated artist building at 13 rue Ravignan, known as Le Bateau-Lavoir. Gertrude and her brother Leo Stein were art collectors and became friends with Picasso later in 1905. The siblings acquired three Rose Period artworks from the artist at a point in his life when Picasso was still a struggling artist, thus playing an important role in his financial circumstances and eventual commercial success. By the end of 1906, Picasso's works were being bought by the art dealer Ambroise Vollard.

Gertrude Stein was an influential collector of modern art. She held weekly "salons" in Paris, which became legendary and were a gathering place for writers, painters, critics, and poets. Gertrude Stein was also a radical and influential writer. Her portrait remained with her in France and she held on to it through both World Wars, until her death.

Portrait of Gertrude Stein was bequeathed to the Metropolitan Museum of Art when she died on 27 July 1946.

== Description ==
Shortly after meeting Stein in 1905, Picasso began to paint her portrait. According to Stein, the process took "eighty or ninety sittings". She recalled how during one session, when the sittings were nearly coming to an end in the winter, Picasso suddenly painted out the head and irritably said, "I can't see you any longer when I look." The portrait was left in this condition until the following autumn, when Stein returned to Paris. After returning from a trip to Spain, Picasso completed the head without even seeing Stein again. When the portrait was complete, both were content with the finished work. Stein said of the portrait, "I was and I still am satisfied with my portrait, for me, it is I, and it is the only reproduction of me which is always I, for me."

Picasso's painting challenged the traditional ideas of portraiture, by depicting the subject as a large, hulking figure who stares blankly across the image, rather than towards the viewer. Her body is a round mass, as she leans forward and leans her arms weightily on her knees. In contrast to the work of Henri Matisse, Picasso uses dark, subdued hues of brown and red, rather than bright colours to portray his subject. Stein's physical details are not depicted realistically – her face has a mask-like appearance, with geometric features. This angular distortion is characteristic of his later Cubist works and is a notable contrast to the rounded, flat rendering of the rest of her body. The portrait's primitive style is inspired perhaps by Picasso's interest in African and Iberian art. The purpose of this was to convey Stein as she really was, and not simply to portray her physical appearance.

Alfred H. Barr Jr., Director of the Museum of Modern Art, commented on the significance of the repainting of the head in Stein's portrait.

During the period between painting out the portrait's face and painting it in again a change of great importance took place in Picasso's art. The original style of the portrait had been naturalistic, comparatively soft and flat, as you can still see in the costume and background. But the repainted face is in the new style, suggesting a sculptured mask with severely drawn, boldly modeled features, rather like the faces of some ancient Spanish sculptures which Picasso had just seen in the Louvre. This change of style turned out to be of great historic importance for it showed the direction Picasso was to follow step by step until it led to cubism.

== Significance and legacy ==
On the portrait's importance, Alfred H. Barr Jr. remarked that, "Aside from its value as a landmark in modern art, Picasso's painting stands as a powerful characterization of one of the most remarkable and influential American writers of her generation."

In 2006, David J. Chalif M.D. remarked on the significance of the painting. "Universally recognized as one of the classic and pivotal works of Picasso's late Rose period, Portrait of Gertrude Stein brilliantly captures the psychological character of one of the great American writers and cultural figures of the last century."

In 2015, Jonathan Jones wrote: "Ever since the Renaissance, the portrayal of women had been shaped by ideals of beauty and constrained social roles. Picasso’s Portrait of Gertrude Stein turns all that upside down. Stein has escaped from the confining categories with which western art previously ensnared women. She is neither old nor young, sexual nor submissive – her stone face makes her something new on Earth. She is in command of her identity."

== See also ==
- Picasso's Rose Period
- Picasso's Blue Period
- List of Picasso artworks 1901–1910
- Portrait painting
- Cubism
- Young Girl with a Flower Basket
- Famille d'acrobates avec singe
- Garçon à la pipe
