= Au Lapin Agile =

Painting by Pablo Picasso

At the Lapin Agile
- Au Lapin Agile
- Artist: Pablo Picasso
- Year: 1905
- Medium: oil paint, canvas
- Dimensions: 99.1 cm (39.0 in) × 100.3 cm (39.5 in)
- Location: Metropolitan Museum of Art
- Accession no.: 1992.391
- Identifiers: The Met object ID: 486162

Au Lapin Agile (English: At the Lapin Agile) is a 1905 oil on canvas painting by Pablo Picasso. It depicts the interior of the Lapin Agile, a famous cabaret club in the Montmartre area of Paris. The composition was produced during Picasso's Rose Period and includes a self-portrait of the artist who frequented the club in his youth. The painting is listed as one of the most expensive paintings after achieving a price of $40.7 million at Sotheby's auction on 27 November 1989. It is housed in the collection of the Metropolitan Museum of Art in New York City.

== Background ==
This painting was produced in 1905, just a few years after the young Picasso and his friend Carles Casagemas settled in Paris in 1900. Not only did they find a new social circle in the artists of Montmartre, but they also became acquainted with a married seamstress named Germaine Pichot. Casagemas became obsessed with Pichot and relentlessly pursued her, but his affections were never returned. Picasso and his friends frequented a local cabaret club known as the Lapin Agile, where they drank and exchanged ideas with other artists. On 17 February 1901, during an evening drink with friends, Casagemas shot at Pichot with a revolver and then shot himself in the head. Picasso was greatly affected by the death of his friend and this tragic event is considered to be the major catalyst for the onset of Picasso's Blue Period. However, despite this emotional trauma, Picasso had an affair with Pichot after the event. In 1905, he was asked by the owner of the Lapin Agile, Frédéric Gérard, to produce a painting that would be hung inside. Picasso agreed in exchange for free food and drinks and created Au Lapin Agile at the age of 25.

== Description ==
Au Lapin Agile depicts a melancholy image of a couple sitting at a bar inside the Lapin Agile. The composition is simple, with little background detail, except for the presence of the bar upon which the couple stand their drinks and the small stage at the rear. The painting features three figures, a harlequin in the foreground, a woman sitting next to him wearing an orange dress and a feather boa, and a guitarist playing in the background. Picasso conveys a sombre scene by primarily using murky reddish-brown hues. The style of this painting is reminiscent of the works of Henri de Toulouse-Lautrec.

The painting depicts figures from Picasso's personal life during this period. The harlequin in the scene is a brooding self-portrait of Picasso, while the woman sitting next to him is Germaine Pichot. The guitarist is Frédéric Gérard, the new owner of the club. Picasso painted himself as the most prominent figure in the scene, ensuring that he would also hold a prominent position in the main room at the club where the painting was to be hung.

Columbia University art historian Theodore Reff has noted the alienation of the couple in the painting, which may reflect Picasso's own mood whilst in the company of Pichot, following the death of Casagemas.

== Provenance ==
Frédéric Gérard commissioned the painting and exhibited it at the Lapin Agile from 1905 to 1912, when it was sold to a German collector.

In 1952, Joan Whitney Payson bought the painting in New York for $60,000. When she died in 1975, it was inherited by her daughter, Lorinda de Roulet.

On 27 November 1989, Walter H. Annenberg bought the painting at auction from the Joan Whitney Payson family for $40.7 million. He gave the painting to the Metropolitan Museum of Art.

== See also ==
- List of most expensive paintings
- 1905 in art
