= Yo, Picasso =

1901 painting by Pablo Picasso

- I, Picasso (English)
- Artist: Pablo Picasso
- Year: 1901
- Medium: Oil on canvas
- Movement: Blue Period
- Dimensions: 73.5 cm × 60.5 cm (28.9 in × 23.8 in)
- Location: Private collection

Yo, Picasso (English: I, Picasso), is an oil-on-canvas painting by Pablo Picasso, which he painted in 1901. It is a self-portrait of the artist that depicts him in his youth, aged 19. The painting was created at the beginning of Picasso's Blue Period. On 9 May 1989, the painting sold at Sotheby's, achieving a price of $47.85 million, making it one of the most expensive paintings sold up to that date.

== Background ==
This self-portrait of Picasso was painted in 1901, when he was a young man aged 19 who had recently arrived in Paris. The year was a significant point in the artist's career, as it was in the June of that year when Picasso's career as an artist was launched at his first exhibition at the gallery of Ambroise Vollard. In the spring of 1901, Picasso was a prolific artist, painting numerous canvases, which he produced in a studio in Montmartre. The year was also the beginning of his Blue Period, a phase characterised by melancholy, blue hues that dominated his artwork. This period was influenced by the suicide of Picasso's friend, the painter Carlos Casagemas, who had shot himself in the head in a Paris café in February 1901.

== Description ==
Yo, Picasso depicts the artist as he appeared in his youth. The painting is a brightly coloured, flamboyant portrait, reminiscent of Van Gogh, which depicts the artist wearing a white shirt and a bright orange cravate around his neck, set against a blue background. The title of the painting is derived from the inscription made by Picasso on the top left of the painting. It has been described as a "a 19th-century swagger portrait" by Charles Darwent for the Independent. The Irish Times has described the portrait as, "a bohemian dandy with thick hair and an intense look". Picasso looks directly at the viewer "with supreme self-confidence", illustrated by the inscription "YO" in large capital letters. This assertion has been described as "defiant" by the Evening Standard.

Picasso’s YO challenges not only us but the great Raphael portrait of Castiglione in the Louvre; make the comparison, this YO demands, my crude immediate brushwork against Raphael’s delicacy, my jarring chromatic contrasts against his tone, my furious energy against his calm, the work of half an afternoon triumphant over the work of weeks of craft and contemplation. Even the palette is not logically laid out as we might expect, but stabbed with the short strokes of colour characteristic of a finished painting — particularly of La Nana, which may be its immediate contemporary. Picasso’s was a YO about to trample all conventions.

== Significance and legacy ==
On 22 May 1981, Paul Richard for The Washington Post described the painting as "a confident, ferocious self-portrait". "Yo, Picasso was one of the most popular self-portraits seen in the enormous Picasso retrospective last summer at the Museum of Modern Art. He had not yet entered his Blue Period, but could already paint with extraordinary power."

== Provenance ==
In November 1912 Hugo von Hofmannsthal purchased Yo, Picasso from the gallery of Heinrich Thannhauser in Munich. The painting was inherited by Hofmannsthal's daughter Christiane, who moved to New York in 1939 with her husband, the Indologist Heinrich Zimmer. The painting remained in the family's possession until it was sold by their son, Michael Zimmer.

Fletcher Jones purchased the painting at Christie's in London for £147,000 in 1970. In December 1975 his estate sold it at Christie's to "an anonymous French buyer" for £283,500. In May 1981, Wendell Cherry bought the painting at Sotheby's in New York for $5.3 million. In May 1989, he sold it at Sotheby's for $47.85 million to Greek billionaire Stavros Niarchos. This was the second highest price paid up to that date for a work of art sold at auction.

== Exhibitions ==
In 2013, it was exhibited at the Courtauld Gallery, "Becoming Picasso: Paris 1901".

== Other self-portraits ==
Picasso created many self-portraits throughout his life, many of which he kept in his possession and passed to his heirs. These self-portraits offer a wide variety of self-representations using different styles, including:

Self Portrait (Yo), 1901, oil on cardboard painting mounted on wood, 51.4 cm x 31.8 cm, MoMA.

Self-Portrait, 1907. oil on canvas, 56 cm x 46 cm. Národní galerie v Praze

Self-Portrait, oil on canvas, 56 cm x 45.3 cm, Private collection, Switzerland

Self-Portrait, Barcelona, 1899–1900, charcoal and chalk on paper, 22.5 cm x 26.5 cm

== See also ==
- List of most expensive paintings
- Child with a Dove
- La Gommeuse
- List of Picasso artworks 1901–1910
