= Femme aux Bras Croisés =

Painting by Pablo Picasso

- Artist: Pablo Picasso
- Year: 1901–02
- Medium: Oil on canvas
- Movement: Picasso's Blue Period
- Dimensions: 81.3 cm × 58.4 cm (32 in × 23 in)
- Location: Private collection

Femme aux Bras Croisés (English: Woman with Folded Arms) is an oil on canvas painting by Pablo Picasso, which he created in 1901–1902 during his Blue Period. The subject of the painting is unknown, but she is considered to be an inmate of the Saint-Lazare hospital-prison in Paris. The painting is listed as one of the most expensive paintings after it sold for $55 million at Christie's auction on 8 November 2000.

== Background ==
This painting is considered to be an important work dating from Picasso's Blue Period. This period began in 1901 and ended in 1904 with the beginning of his Rose Period. The Blue Period represents an important shift in Picasso's approach from his previous work in terms of style and subject matter. In place of the popular scenes of urban leisure, he began to experiment with monochromes and focus on melancholy themes of poverty, loneliness and death. His paintings were now dominated by shades of blue and featured portraits of destitute, sick people and prostitutes. Picasso's friend Pierre Daix commented that this announced Picasso's "...descent into hell...[into] the depths of solitude and despair". This new style was heavily influenced by the death of Picasso's close friend Carles Casagemas, who committed suicide in 1901.

== Description ==
Femme aux Bras Croisés is a portrait of a woman sitting in a prison cell. The image conveys an atmosphere of misery and torment, which is achieved by the woman's body posture and the starkness of her surroundings. Her crossed arms and blank stare illustrate her isolation, while her physical and emotional disconnection reflects her social isolation.

It is believed that the painting was begun in France in the second half of 1901 and then moved to Spain, where Picasso made changes to the composition. This was confirmed by x-ray, which showed that Picasso had repainted the woman's hair over a previous hood.

In her 1957 book Pablo Picasso, Antonina Vallentin discusses the haunting qualities of this painting. She considers the subject to be an inmate who recently attempted suicide and now carries the blank but menacing stare of those unfortunates who found themselves at Saint-Lazare hospital-prison during the early 1900s.

Picasso often visited the Saint-Lazare hospital-prison in Paris in the second half of 1901 to find models for his paintings. John Richardson commented that, "The Saint-Lazare women were victims of society nobody would deny, but they are also to some extent Picasso's victims. There is a hint of eroticism, even sadism, to their portrayal... Years later Picasso would describe women with some relish as 'suffering machines'. No wonder there is more romantic agony than social criticism to Blue Period imagery".

Picasso used monochromatic colour to reinforce the sense of isolation and despair in his paintings. The dominant use of blue tones is particularly significant. Juan-Eduardo Cirlot comments that, "It is a blue which makes us think of night, but it is the symbol rather of maternal protection, of rest and forgetful dreams to soothe the sufferings of humble people, than of dark hostile power. Picasso has always been deeply humanitarian... [and] sensitive to human suffering, and he seems to have been strongly impelled to translate it into paint."

== Significance and legacy ==
Christie's describes the significance of Picasso's Blue Period paintings. "The paintings of the Blue period comprise some of Picasso's most concise and compelling portrayals of human emotion. […] Above all, Picasso concentrated on the expressive possibilities of the human form, as exemplified in seminal works such as Femme aux bras croisés."

== Ownership history ==
Gertrude Stein originally bought the painting from Picasso. From 1936 it was in the collection of the family of Chauncey McCormick, who lent it to the Art Institute of Chicago. On 8 November 2000 it sold at auction at Christie's, New York, for $55 million.

== See also ==
- List of most expensive paintings
- The Blue Room
- The Old Guitarist
- La Vie
