= Paul Friedrich Leffmann =

Paul Leffmann (3 April 1870 in Dulken – 1956 in Switzerland) was a German Jewish industrialist and art collector who became a stateless refugee under the Nazis. The circumstances of the loss of a valuable Picasso in his art collection has been the subject of major lawsuits and legislation in the United States.

== Biography ==
Paul Leffmann married Alice Brandensteinת and in 1912 the Leffmanns had a villa built in Lindenthal neighborhood of Cologne by the architect and decorator Bruno Paul, who designed and built several villas for other wealthy Jewish art collectors including Alfred Flechtheim. The villa was filled with artworks, including a large painting by Picasso which hung in the dining room. The German architectural magazine devoted more than a dozen pages to the Leffmann Villa in its 1921 edition.

When Alfred Flechtheim organized the Cologne Sonderbund of 1912, Leffmann lent Picasso’s The Actor to it.

== Aryanization and flight ==
In 1935, Antisemitic laws enacted by Hitler’s Nazi government forced Leffmann to transfer his home and factory to non-Jews. Like all Jews attempted to flee Nazi Germany he had to pay a confiscatory flight tax. Leffmann left Germany for Italy in 1937, and then fled to Brazil via Switzerland. He sold The Actor in 1938 in order to finance his journey.

Leffmann returned to Europe after the defeat of the Nazis, settling in Switzerland. As a very old man he travelled to Germany to try to file claims for the loss of his home and factory, but managed to recover only a small fraction of the value. He died in Switzerland in 1956, followed by his widow, Alice in 1967.

The most important artwork in his collection, Picasso’s The Actor, had in the meantime been donated to the Metropolitan museum of Art by art collector Thelma Chysler Foy.

== Claim for Restitution of The Actor: Zuckerman v. Metropolitan ==
In 2016, Leffmann’s great-grandniece filed a lawsuit in the Southern District of New York against the Metropolitan Museum of Art on behalf of all the Leffmann heirs, demanding the return of Picasso’s The Actor.

The District Court dismissed the claim, and the Estate appealed. The appellate court dismissed the appeal on the grounds of laches. The Estate filed a petition for certiorari with the Supreme Court of the United States, arguing that application of the HEAR Act should have prevented reliance on the equitable defense of laches.
