= Brick Factory at Tortosa =

1909 painting by Pablo Picasso

- Artist: Pablo Picasso
- Year: 1909
- Medium: Oil on canvas
- Movement: Proto-Cubism
- Dimensions: 50.7 cm × 60.2 cm (20.0 in × 23.7 in)
- Location: The State Hermitage Museum; Saint Petersburg, Russia

Brick Factory at Tortosa (L'Usine, Horta de Ebro) is a 1909 oil on canvas painting by Pablo Picasso, which he created during a visit to Horta de Sant Joan in Catalonia. It depicts a landscape of a factory and palm trees, which are presented in a simplified, geometric style. The work belongs to Picasso's African Period and is considered a Proto-Cubist work. It is held in the collection of The State Hermitage Museum in Saint Petersburg.

== Background ==
Picasso produced Brick Factory at Tortosa in the summer of 1909, when he was aged 28. It was created while he was on holiday at Horta de Sant Joan in Catalonia, Spain from Paris. The painting displays Picasso's developing style towards Cubism, which would eventually become fully formed in 1910 with paintings like Portrait of Daniel-Henry Kahnweiler.

The painting was one of several that Picasso produced in Southern Spain during this year, including The Reservoir, Horta de Ebro, The Oil Mill, and Paysage, Horta de Ebro, landscapes that display the same simplified geometric style.

Horta de Sant Joan played an important role in Picasso's development as an artist. He stayed in the village twice, once as a teenager in 1898 with his friend and fellow art student, Manuel Pallarés, and again from 5 June to September 1909. During his first visit, Picasso had experienced a new sense of freedom, set apart from the artistic restrictions of his father, José Ruiz y Blasco and La Academía de Bellas Artes. Picasso stated, "Everything that I know I have learned in Horta". He returned to Horta in the summer of 1909, ten years after his first visit. By this point, he had achieved a level of prestige as an artist in Paris and he was visiting with his girlfriend Fernande Olivier. This visit inspired Picasso to produce paintings dominated by landscapes depicted in a geometric style. It was a period in which he rediscovered himself as an artist and developed an experimental new style that would eventually lead to Cubism. He left the village at the beginning of September 1909 and never returned.

== Description ==
Picasso painted Brick Factory at Tortosa using oils on canvas. The painting measures 50.7 cm x 60.2 cm. The image depicts a factory which was an unusual subject for the period, as it departed from the typical 19th century landscapes of distant smokestacks. In this painting Picasso reduced the factory and its chimney to rough geometric shapes, simplifying the forms to almost unrecognisable objects. He conveyed the summer heat and dryness of the landscape by including a grey sky and landscape in the background. The volumes of the structure are deliberately sketchy, presented using grey and orange planes, rather than realistic external facades. The shapes of the building have been presented in a way that is neither neat or regular. Picasso intended to create an abstract image that is difficult to logically describe.

In his book, Picasso: Architecture and Vertigo, Christopher Green remarked that the factory and palm trees depicted in the painting almost certainly did not exist in real life. John Richardson suggested that the palm trees in the painting may have been a series of olive presses known by locals as "the factory". Further to this suggestion of an invented factory, Roland Penrose had recorded a meeting with Manuel Pallarés, who told him that the factory was an invention and did not exist in that location. Green goes on to suggest that Picasso may have been depicting a brickworks outside Tortosa or even the factories and palm trees of Barcelona. He opines that this depiction of the factory can be seen as a representation of the modernising view of Catalonia or of modernity in opposition to nature.

== Significance and legacy ==
Jonathan Jones of The Guardian called the work "formidable" and viewed the painting as "an experiment in how brutally you can reduce, simplify, solidify and abstract forms and still produce a picture that is not simply recognisable, but profoundly full of life."

Laurent Le Bon, Chairman of the Musée Picasso in Paris, remarked on the importance of this period and location in relation to Picasso's development as an artist. "The artist did not travel much, but here we can see how he revolutionised the way the world is represented through art.[...]This is where the artist found a different way of seeing things."

== Provenance ==
The painting was originally in the collection of Sergei Shchukin. It was acquired by the State Museum of New Western Art in Moscow and then transferred to The State Hermitage Museum in 1948.
