= Old Jewish Man with a Boy =

Painting by Pablo Picasso

- Artist: Pablo Picasso
- Year: 1903
- Medium: Oil on canvas
- Movement: Picasso's Blue Period
- Dimensions: 125 cm × 92 cm (49 in × 36 in)
- Location: Pushkin Museum, Moscow

Old Jewish Man with a Boy or Blind Beggar with a Boy is an oil on canvas painting by Pablo Picasso, from 1903. It was made in Barcelona, Spain, and characteristic of his Blue Period. Picasso later moved to Paris, where he sold the work to Sergei Shchukin, whose collection was seized by the Soviet state after the October Revolution, which assigned it to its present home in the Pushkin Museum, in Moscow.

== Description ==
On a dark blue background, two beggars are depicted, an old man and a boy, who embody the two most helpless, unprotected ages - childhood and old age. Picasso depicts an emaciated blind old man. The boy clinging to him also seems to be blind, his eyes are also motionless and dead.

Both the old man and the boy are dressed in rags, and are wrapped in an old blanket. Under the torn trousers, the beggar's legs, emaciated to the limit, are visible. His unkempt beard, hair tied with an old handkerchief, and sunken cheeks, all testify to their poverty and long-term malnutrition. The boy eats an apple, probably the only alms he had at the day. The clear lines of the painting resemble a sculptural image, and its emphasized by the lack of detail. On a blue background, only the faces of the two persons and the legs of the old man stand out. Not a single extra detail distracts from this expressive group.
