= Portrait of Jaume Sabartés =

1901 painting by Pablo Picasso

- Artist: Pablo Picasso
- Year: 1901
- Medium: Oil on canvas
- Dimensions: 82 cm × 66 cm (32 in × 26 in)
- Location: Pushkin Museum, Moscow

Portrait of Jaume Sabartés or Le bock (The Mug of Beer) is a 1901 oil on canvas painting by Pablo Picasso of his friend Jaume Sabartés, now in the Pushkin Museum. He produced it in Paris in autumn 1901 early in his Blue Period, one of eight pencil or paint portraits he made of Sabartés, re-using a canvas previously showing a seated child.
