= Garçon à la pipe =

1905 painting by Pablo Picasso

- Boy with a Pipe (English)
- Artist: Pablo Picasso
- Year: 1905
- Medium: Oil on canvas
- Movement: Picasso's Rose Period, Post-Impressionism
- Dimensions: 100 cm × 81.3 cm (39.4 in × 32.0 in)
- Location: Private collection

Garçon à la Pipe ('Boy with a Pipe') is an oil on canvas painting by Pablo Picasso. It was painted in 1905 when Picasso was 24 years old, during his Rose Period, soon after he settled in the Montmartre area of Paris. The painting depicts a Parisian adolescent boy who holds a pipe in his left hand and wears a garland of flowers on his head, surrounded by two floral decorations. The subject was a local boy named "P’tit Louis" who died at a young age. The painting is listed as one of the most expensive paintings, after being sold at Sotheby's auction for $104 million on 5 May 2004. It is currently the fifth highest selling painting by Picasso.

== Background ==
In 1905, Picasso was still a struggling artist and had settled in Montmartre in Paris. He was living in poverty in a dilapidated artist building at 13 rue Ravignan known as Le Bateau-Lavoir. Picasso had made the transition from his earlier pessimistic Blue Period and was now in a new, more optimistic phase known as his Rose Period.

== Description ==
Garçon à la Pipe depicts a teenage boy who is in a seated position surrounded by two bouquets of flowers. He is dressed in blue overalls and wears a garland of roses on his head. He holds a pipe in his left hand the wrong way round. André Salmon, a friend of Picasso, described in 1912 how Picasso had created the painting, "after a delightful series of metaphysical acrobats, dancers like priestesses of Diana, delightful clowns and wistful Harlequins". In place of this, Picasso was now focusing on a simple image of a young Parisian boy, dressed in blue denim.

The boy depicted in this painting was known as "P’tit Louis", or "Little Louis". He was described by Picasso as, "one of the “local types, actors, ladies, gentlemen, delinquents” who frequented the studios in the Bateau-Lavoir. The harsh life of a street boy resulted in the subject dying at a young age.

Preliminary studies for this painting show the boy in a variety of different poses, including standing, sitting, leaning against a wall, lighting a pipe or holding it in his hands. Picasso eventually chose to depict his model in the seated position shown in the finished painting, which he painstakingly worked on in a preparatory study. The studies differ from the final painting by changing the subject from a young boy to a more mature adolescent. The final effect is a depiction of a mysterious figure surrounded by masses of flowers that is reminiscent of Odilon Redon's work.

André Salmon described how Picasso had transformed what was originally a study from life to the current artwork in a sudden flash of inspiration.

One night, Picasso abandoned the company of his friends and their intellectual chit-chat. He returned to his studio, took the canvas he had abandoned a month before and crowned the figure of the little apprentice lad with roses. He had made this work a masterpiece thanks to a sublime whim.

Picasso's rendering of "P'tit Louis" has elements of classical art. He was particularly inspired by the work of the French Neoclassical painter Ingres. Like Picasso's Young Girl with a Flower Basket, which was painted in the same year, Garçon à la Pipe conveys conflicting imagery of innocence and experience. Picasso described the boy as an "evil angel". In this painting, the boy wears a garland of roses on his head to symbolise the blood of the Eucharist, a reference to the transition from youth to maturity. Picasso also depicts the contrast between the harsh street life that Louis endured and the innocence of his youth.

The peculiar position of the pipe in the boy's hand has been the subject of interpretation. As the pipe was commonly used as a symbol of intellectual reflection in nineteenth- and twentieth-century painting, the pipe's position gains particular significance. The pipe appears as though being held from outside the painting, rather than from inside, thus suggesting a fusion of realities, where the boy is a reflection of Picasso himself.

John Richardson suggested that the painting could have been inspired by a poem entitled A Crime of Love by Paul Verlaine.

One of the most poetic Rose period images is the Boy with a Pipe. It conjures up Verlaine’s poem ‘Crimen Amoris,’ about a palace in Ecbatana where ‘adolescent satans’ neglect the five senses for the seven deadly sins, except for the most handsome of all these evil angels, who is sixteen years old under his wreath of flowers… and who dreams away, his eyes full of fire and tears.

== Claim for restitution and provenance ==
Paul von Mendelssohn-Bartholdy probably acquired the painting c.1910. Shortly before his death in 1935, he wrote a will bequeathing it to his non-Jewish wife, Countess Else Mendelssohn-Bartholdy Kesselstett (née Lavergne-Paguilhen) who sold it to Walter Feilchenfeldt in 1949. Mr. and Mrs. John Hay Whitney then acquired the painting on 13 January 1950 for $30,000.

In 2004, Professor Julius H Schoeps challenged the 1949 sale of Boy with a Pipe due to circumstances related to the Nazi persecution of the Jewish owner and his attempts to shield the painting from seizure via his non-Jewish wife.

On 5 May 2004 the painting was sold for $104,168,000 at Sotheby's auction in New York City. Sotheby’s did not name the buyer though sources say that it was Guido Barilla, co-owner of the Barilla Group. At the time, it broke the record for the amount paid for an auctioned painting (when inflation is ignored). The amount, $104 million, includes the auction price of $93 million plus the auction house’s commission of about $11 million. The painting was given a pre-sale estimate of $70 million by the auction house.

== Significance and legacy ==
In 2004, Charles Moffet, co-director of Impressionist and modern art at Sotheby's remarked on the painting's significance as a masterpiece.

It has a haunting ambiguity that has ensured its status as one of Picasso's most celebrated images of adolescent beauty. It is, without question, one of the most beautiful of the artist's Rose Period paintings and one of the most important early works by Pablo Picasso.

== Reception ==
Garçon à la Pipe has been described as a masterpiece, yet its sale at auction in 2004 for the price of $104 million caused some controversy amongst art critics. Picasso expert Pepe Karmel described the work as a "minor painting" and considered that its high sale price showed, "how much the marketplace is divorced from the true values of art". Blake Gopnik for The Washington Times opined that, "Though the word "masterpiece" was much bandied about in the buildup to the auction, it's unlikely there's a single art historian who would rate this Rose Period picture."

In contrast, The New York Sun remarked that, "'Boy with a Pipe' is a thrilling painting whose beauty would take a lifetime to exhaust".

== In popular culture ==
Calvin Harris' 2017 song "Slide" contains the lyrics "I might empty my bank account and buy that boy with a pipe". Vocalist Frank Ocean explained that it is an allusion to, “a Picasso painting that sold for so much money".

== See also ==
- List of most expensive paintings
- Picasso’s Rose Period
- Picasso’s Blue Period
- Young Girl with a Flower Basket
- Famille d'acrobates avec singe
