= Family of Saltimbanques =

1905 painting by Pablo Picasso

- Artist: Pablo Picasso
- Year: 1905
- Medium: Oil on canvas
- Movement: Picasso's Rose Period
- Dimensions: 212.8 cm × 229.6 cm (83 3/4 in × 90 3/8 in)
- Location: Chester Dale Collection, National Gallery of Art, Washington, D.C.
- Accession: 1963.10.190

Family of Saltimbanques (French: Famille de saltimbanques) is a 1905 oil on canvas painting by Pablo Picasso. The work depicts six saltimbanques, a kind of itinerant circus performer, in a desolate landscape. It is considered the masterpiece of Picasso's Rose Period, sometimes called his circus period. The painting is housed in the collection of the National Gallery of Art in Washington, D.C.

== Background ==
This painting was created during Picasso's early years as an artist after moving to Paris from Barcelona in 1904. As a young man with little money, Picasso lived in a studio in a dilapidated building known as the Bateau-Lavoir. He was fortunate to be surrounded by the many young artists who lived in the building and local area, but for Picasso, this was a period of loneliness and poverty. His sympathy for lonely, poor and isolated people is most evident in the melancholy paintings of his Blue Period, which continued until 1904. By 1905, Picasso shifted his outlook and began to paint in a new palette of warmer shades, depicting subjects with a more positive tone. In this Rose Period, Picasso developed an interest in the life of the saltimbanque, or travelling circus performer, often depicting groups or families of acrobats.

== Description ==
Family of Saltimbanques was painted during a period from late 1904 to early 1906 when Picasso was exploring themes about the saltimbanque. During this period, Picasso frequently attended the Cirque Médrano in Montmartre and was inspired by a group of performers there. In the circus performers, Picasso found a connection, as like himself, many of them were from Spain and experienced a transitory lifestyle that he had also experienced as a young man.

Family of Saltimbanques is a huge painting measuring 7 ft x 7.5 ft. It was an ambitious work for a young, impoverished artist. The painting consists of a group of saltimbanques, who stand together but appear to be disconnected as they do not look at one another. Picasso depicted himself in this composition as the harlequin dressed in a diamond-patterned costume. The figures in the group appear isolated as if lost in their own thoughts. They glance towards a woman who is sitting alone. The harlequin is shown to be reaching towards a child who is standing behind him.

John Richardson and other art historians have considered that the dreamy atmosphere of the painting and the expressionless appearances of the figures were influenced by Picasso's use of opium, a substance that was regularly used by the tenants of the Bateau-Lavoir during this period. In the first volume of John Richardson's 1991 biography A Life of Picasso, he stated that the artist smoked opium several times a week between 1904 and 1908.

== Scientific analysis ==
Analysis of the painting has revealed that Picasso painted the composition twice before completing the third and final layer. In 1980, E. A. Carmean and Ann Hoenigswald made the discovery whilst carrying out an x-ray examination of the painting. The examination revealed that there were two earlier paintings beneath the surface, the first of which depicted a circus family and the second depicted a pair of acrobats. This showed that Picasso worked on the canvas for over a year and also helped to clarify the chronology of his artistic transition from the end of his Blue Period in 1904 to his early Rose Period in 1905. Art historians remain unclear about whether Picasso painted over the earlier paintings because he was dissatisfied with them or because he was simply too poor to afford a new canvas.

X-radiography has shown the previous versions of the painting, in which Picasso had made several changes to the figures, such as the woman's hat and shoulders, the colour of the child's ballet slippers and the red jester's leg.

The scientific study also revealed how Picasso not only changed the figures over the course of several versions of the painting, but also changed the tonality. The original image was predominantly blue but Picasso changed this to rose and allowed the blue shades to show through the paint as he made changes to the painting. The resulting final composition conveys a dusky rose-blue palette that presents an overarching atmosphere of sadness.

== Interpretation ==
Critics have suggested that Family of Saltimbanques is a covert group portrait of Picasso and his social circle, symbolized as poor, independent and isolated. The painting was removed from the Spanish salon at the IX Biennale of Venice in 1910, because it was considered inappropriate by the organization.

The figures in the painting have been described as representations of specific identities. While the harlequin resembles Picasso, the small acrobat resembles Picasso's friend, the poet Max Jacob. The deep-browed acrobat is considered to be a representation of André Salmon and the large jester is said to be a representation of Guillaume Apollinaire. It was alongside these friends that Picasso would frequent the Cirque Medrano. In his book Picasso and Apollinaire: The Persistence of Memory, Peter Read notes that preparatory drawings for the work revealed that the large jester was actually a representation of El Tio Pepe Don José, the head of a circus troupe. He continues by opining that the figures in the painting are allegorical and represent Picasso and his social circle facing a new century without a clear path to guide them.

Harold B. Plum notes that the figures in the painting are placed from left to right in a receding order of height, with the tallest figure being Picasso himself. He describes the painting as an illustration of the artist's personal transition. "In the painting, he was depicting a metamorphosis from late childhood to adulthood, in life and art."

E.A. Carmean has drawn a connection between the figures in the painting and the circumstances of Picasso's own personal life. At the time that Picasso was working on this painting he was living with his partner Fernande Olivier. She had brought a ten-year-old girl home from an orphanage and then returned her. Carmean noted that in the painting, the harlequin, who represents Picasso, is reaching out for the girl who is standing behind his back. On the right side of the painting is an isolated woman, representing Olivier, who is sitting with one hand on her shoulder and the other in her lap as if holding a missing baby. Carmean considers that this image is a metaphor for this emotional incident in Picasso's life.

== Significance and legacy ==
Family of Saltimbanques is the culmination of the Saltimbanque cycle, a series of drawings, paintings, engravings and sculptures that Picasso focused on from late 1904 to the end of 1905. After studying the lives of the circus performers of the Cirque Medrano, Picasso chose to portray them not from the cheerful perspective of their performances, but as an isolated group within a static and melancholy image. Musée d'Orsay describes the painting as a masterpiece and remarks that, "Picasso is less interested in the show, usually excluded from the frame, than in the other aspects of their lives, capturing a medial space between public and private worlds where in the most banal triviality and the most sublime grace converge."

== Provenance ==
The painting was originally purchased directly from Picasso in 1908 by the Parisian businessman André Level for the La Peau de l'Ours Collection. Six years later, it was sold at Hôtel Drouot and acquired by the Thannhauser Galleries in Munich. Sometime between November 1914 and June 1915, the canvas was bought by Hertha Koenig, and then to the Valentine Gallery in New York. In 1931, the artwork was sold to Chester Dale, who eventually gave it to the National Gallery of Art via bequest in 1963.

== References in other works ==
Bohemian–Austrian poet Rainer Maria Rilke (1875–1926) was inspired by this painting as he wrote the fifth of ten elegies in his Duino Elegies (1923). Rilke used the figures in Picasso's painting as a symbol of "human activity ... always travelling and with no fixed abode, they are even a shade more fleeting than the rest of us, whose fleetingness was lamented." Further, although Picasso's painting depicts the figures in a desolate desert landscape, Rilke described them as standing on a "threadbare carpet" to suggest "the ultimate loneliness and isolation of Man in this incomprehensible world, practicing their profession from childhood to death as playthings of an unknown will...before their 'pure too-little; had passed into 'empty too-much'."

Ingmar Bergman cited Picasso's image as an inspiration for The Seventh Seal.

== See also ==
- The Actor
- Acrobat and Young Harlequin
- Famille d'acrobates avec singe
- Girl on a Ball
