= Daniel-Henry Kahnweiler (Picasso) =

1910 painting by Pablo Picasso

Retrato de Daniel-Henry Kahnweiler
- Portrait of Daniel-Henry Kahnweiler (English)
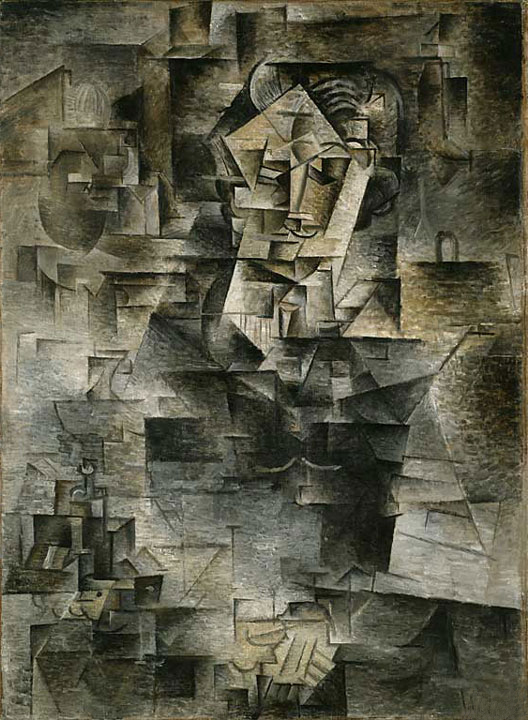
- Artist: Pablo Picasso
- Year: 1910
- Medium: Oil on canvas
- Movement: Cubism
- Dimensions: 100.4 cm × 72.4 cm (39.5 in × 28.5 in)
- Location: Art Institute of Chicago; Chicago

Portrait of Daniel-Henry Kahnweiler (Spanish: Retrato de Daniel-Henry Kahnweiler) is an oil on canvas painting by Pablo Picasso in the Analytical Cubism style. It was completed in the autumn of 1910 and depicts the prominent art dealer Daniel-Henry Kahnweiler, who played an important role in supporting Cubism. The painting is housed in the collection of the Art Institute of Chicago.

== Background ==
Daniel-Henry Kahnweiler was a German Jew who was born in Mannheim. His family wanted him to pursue a career in banking or the stock market, but instead he decided to become an art dealer. At just 23 years of age, he opened an art gallery in Paris. Although he had no knowledge about selling art, he did have a keen interest in avant-garde art. This was at a time when the French public still displayed a great amount of hostility towards modernist art, in particular the Fauves.

Picasso met Kahnweiler in 1908 after he opened his art gallery, Galerie Kahnweiler, in Paris at 28 rue Vignon in May 1907. He played an important role in the development of Cubism by representing Picasso as his art dealer, but also by introducing him to Georges Braque. Kahnweiler supported the experimental style of Cubism by purchasing a large portion of the artists' works and also by publishing a book in 1920 titled The Rise of Cubism.

Kahnweiler had an interest in the work of challenging artists. He was drawn to artists like Maurice de Vlaminck, André Derain, and Braque. When he visited Picasso in his studio at the Bateau-Lavoir, he found Picasso in a state of depression, caused by his friends' rejection of his latest experimental works. However, Kahnweiler was stunned and intrigued by Picasso's Les Demoiselles d’Avignon and recognised that traditional painting techniques were being overthrown by a new art movement. This meeting between Picasso and Kahnweiler changed both their lives and cemented their reputations in relation to Cubism. Kahnweiler had enormous influence on the movement, by choosing which Cubist artist to support and which to reject, and continued to offer contracts to the artists he supported until 1914. Kahnweiler signed his first contract with Braque on 30 November 1912 and also signed with Derain, Picasso, Maurice de Vlaminck, Juan Gris and Fernand Léger. These exclusive contracts gave him the right of first refusal for these artists’ works, ensuring that Kahnweiler became the sole supplier of their works until the First World War.

Kahnweiler's promotion of Cubist works made him one of the most influential art dealers of the 20th century. His championing of Cubism in the 1910s and 1920s was pivotal to the movement's success. Picasso said of his friend, "What would have become of us if Kahnweiler hadn’t had a business sense?"

Pierre Assouline wrote that, "Kahnweiler was one of the few people to believe in him completely and absolutely at a moment when Picasso had touched bottom... From that moment their fates were sealed."

== Description ==
This painting was created by Picasso in the autumn of 1910 and is a portrait in the Cubist style. It is an oil painting on canvas and measures 100.4 cm x 72.4 cm. The painting depicts Daniel-Henry Kahnweiler, a prominent and influential art dealer who owned an art gallery in Paris. He sat for this portrait at least 30 times so that Picasso could achieve this representation. At its heart, the painting is a rather traditional portrait of a man sitting with his hands placed in his lap. However, rather than portraying Kahnweiler in a realistic way, Picasso created a fractured image by breaking down the forms into planes and faceted shapes and then merging them together. The resulting image is abstract, but some features of the subject can still be detected, such as a wave of his hair, the knot of his tie and his watch chain.

The combination of Kahnweiler's wavy hair, eyes, brow and chin aid the viewer in building a visual impression of his head, but this image drifts in and out of focus. The graphic nature of these features is similar to a classic caricature.

Museu Picasso comments that, "Kahnweiler’s punctilious time-keeping and legendary patience are epitomised by the eye-catching sign for the watch-chain straddling the waistcoat of his immaculate dark suit and the prominence given to his neatly clasped hands resting in his lap."

== Significance and legacy ==
Roland Penrose noted that when this painting was first viewed, it caused "a great deal of controversy" from art critics who considered it an outrage and an insult against serious, traditional art. Picasso had been skilled in his abilities to create realistic representations of models since his youth, yet chose to convey Kahnweiler in this experimental style. Penrose describes the portrait as "a unique and fascinating work".

Jonathan Jones of The Guardian described the work as "Picasso’s Cubist masterpiece" and opined that it is "probably the greatest work of modern art currently on view in London. It is as profound as a portrait by Rembrandt."

"Revolutionary and discomforting, this masterpiece is part of a comprehensive dismantling of traditional portraiture that started when Picasso painted Gertrude Stein in 1905 to 1906 and gave her a stone mask for a face."

== Provenance ==
The painting was gifted by Mrs. Gilbert W. Chapman in memory of Charles B. Goodspeed in 1948 to the Art Institute of Chicago.

== See also ==
- Les Demoiselles d'Avignon
- Portrait of Ambroise Vollard
- The Accordionist
- Le pigeon aux petits pois
