= Saint Martin and the Beggar (El Greco) =

Painting by El Greco

- San Martín y el mendigo (Spanish)
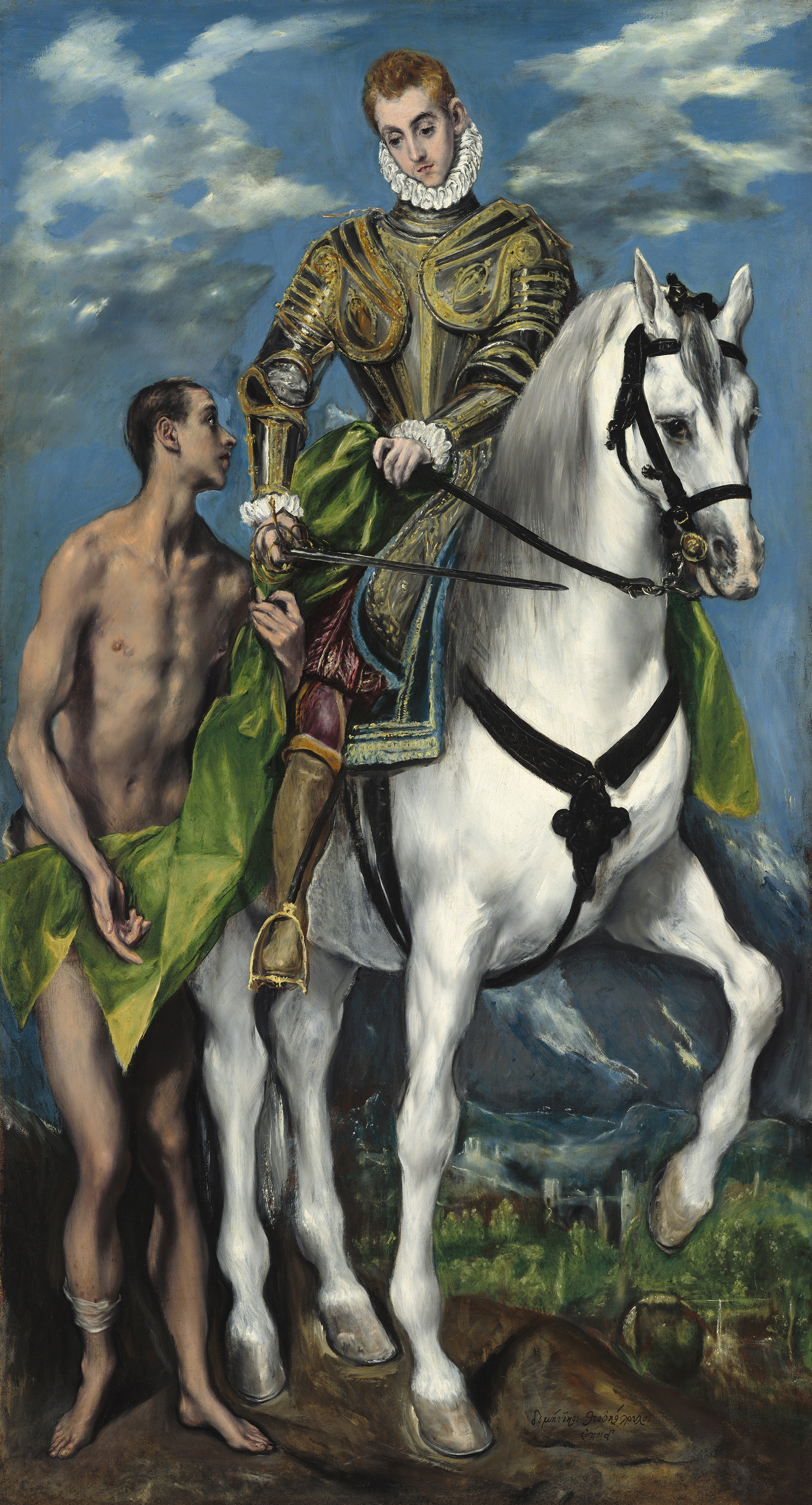
- Artist: El Greco
- Year: c. 1597-1599
- Type: Oil paint on canvas
- Dimensions: 193.5 cm × 103 cm (76.2 in × 41 in)
- Location: National Gallery of Art, Washington DC

Saint Martin and the Beggar is a painting by the Greek mannerist painter El Greco, painted c. 1597–1599. It depicts a legend in the life of Christian saint Martin of Tours, in which the saint cut off half his cloak to clothe a beggar. Part of a triptych commissioned for a private chapel, the paintings Saint Martin and the Beggar and The Virgin and Child with Saints Martina and Agnes remained in the chapel in the Spanish city of Toledo, until 1907, when they were sold to the American collector Peter Widener. They were later incorporated into the permanent collection of the National Gallery of Art, Washington, D.C.

El Greco painted smaller versions of large commissioned paintings, which he could then sell independently. El Greco's smaller version of St Martin and the Beggar is now in the collection of the Art Institute of Chicago.

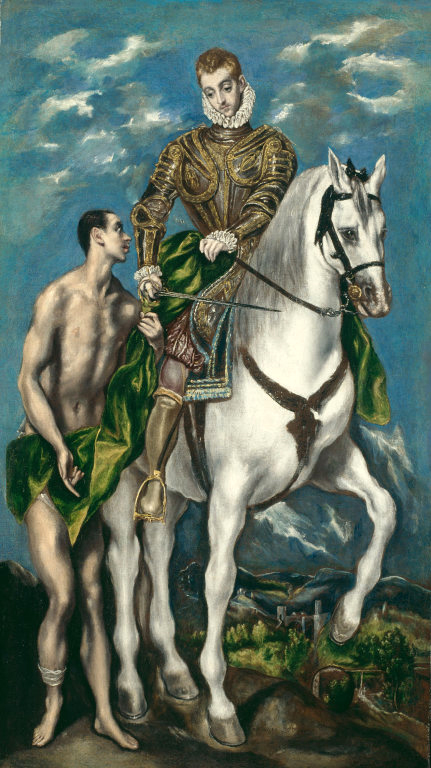
El Greco, Saint Martin and the Beggar, c. 1597–1600, 110 × 63 cm (43.3 × 24.8 in), Art Institute of Chicago

== See also ==
- List of works by El Greco
