= La Vie (painting) =

Painting by Pablo Picasso

La Vie (The Life)
- Artist: Pablo Picasso
- Year: 1903
- Medium: Oil-on-canvas
- Movement: Picasso's Blue Period
- Dimensions: 196.5 cm × 129.2 cm (77.4 in × 50.9 in)
- Location: Cleveland Museum of Art, Cleveland

La Vie (Zervos I 179) is a 1903 oil painting by Pablo Picasso. It is widely regarded as the pinnacle of Picasso's Blue Period.

The painting is in the permanent collection of the Cleveland Museum of Art.

== Description and history ==
La Vie (The Life) was painted in Barcelona in May 1903. It is 196.5 by 129.2 centimetres (6.45 ft × 4.24 ft) and portrays two pairs of people, a naked couple confronting a mother bearing a child in her arms. In the background of the room, apparently a studio, there are two paintings within the painting, the upper one showing a crouching and embracing nude couple, the lower one showing a lonesome crouching nude person very similar to Sorrow by Vincent van Gogh. With this Picasso repainted another motif, a birdsman who attacks a reclining naked woman, traces of which are visible to the naked eye. Preparatory studies are: Private collection, Zervos XXII 44; Paris, Musée Picasso, MPP 473; Barcelona, Museu Picasso, MPB 101.507; Barcelona, Museu Picasso, MPB 101.508.

It was painted at a time when Picasso was having no financial success. In contrast, the new painting sold only a month after it was finished, to a French art dealer, Jean Saint Gaudens. The sale was reported in the Barcelona newspaper, Liberal. With La Vie Picasso repainted the canvas of The derniers Moments from 1899, a painting that he had presented at the Paris International Exhibition 1900.

The painting was given by the Hanna fund to the Cleveland Museum of Art, Ohio in 1945 and is in their permanent collection.

In 2020, the painting was loaned to the Royal Academy of Arts in London as part of the 'Picasso and Paper' exhibition, where it was displayed with preparatory drawings and other works on paper exploring corresponding themes of poverty, despair and social alienation.

== Interpretation ==
The interpretation of the enigmatic composition has been the subject of much discussion. The male figure clearly shows the portrait of Picasso's friend, the painter Carlos Casagemas, who had committed suicide not long before Picasso painted La Vie. X-ray photographs show that Picasso first executed a self-portrait that he later replaced by the portrait of his friend. This fact and the circumstance that the confrontation of the two groups happens within a studio makes it verisimilar that self-reflective questions of the young artist are addressed in La Vie. The crucial point indeed, scholars agree, seems to be the enigmatic gesture in the center of the composition.

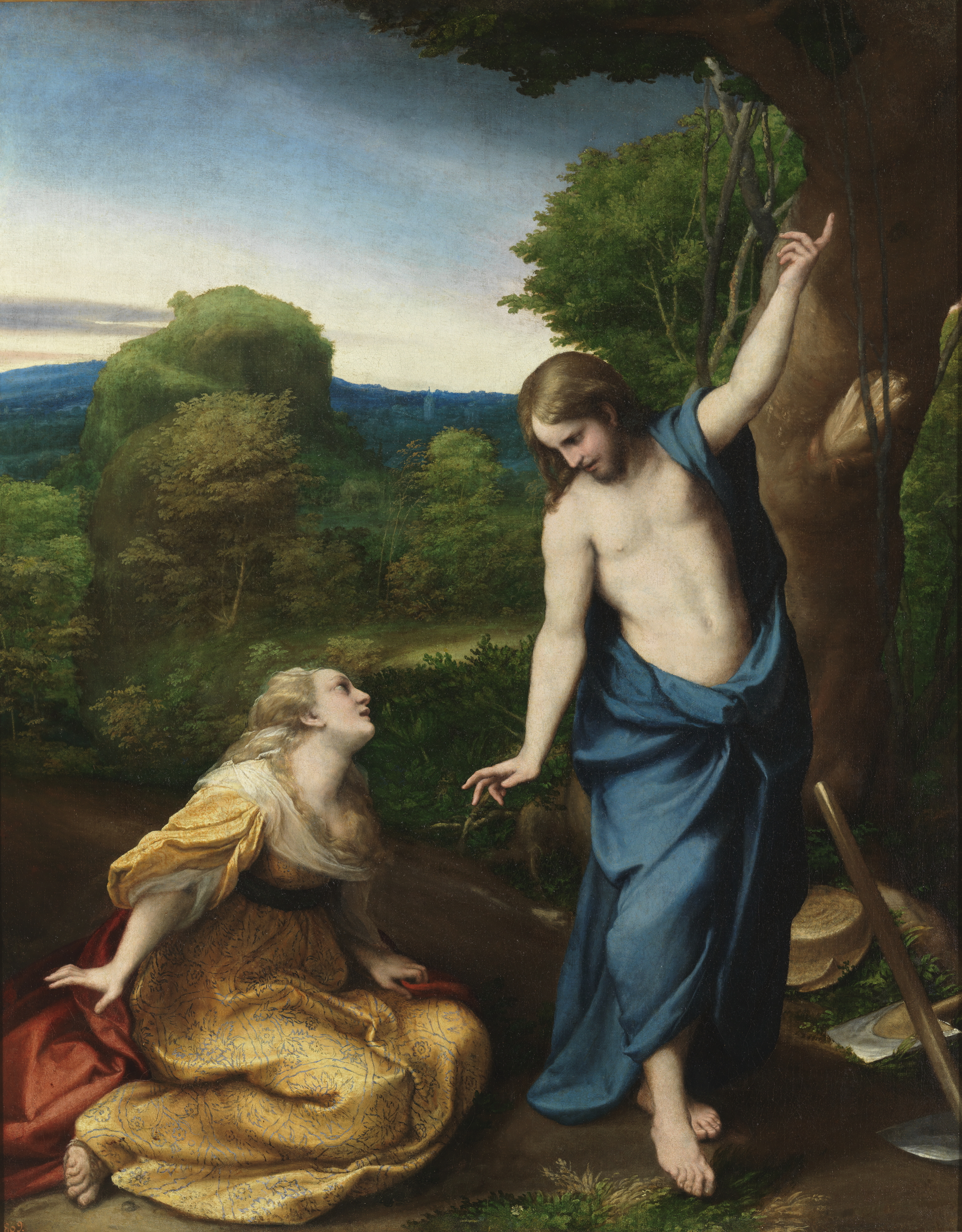
Noli me tangere, Antonio da Correggio, c. 1525

In 2003 Becht-Jördens and Wehmeier recognized the well known painting Noli me tangere, a masterpiece by Antonio da Correggio in the Museo del Prado, as the possible source for this gesture and proposed an interpretation situated on two levels. The first, a biographical one that concerns the dyadic mother and child relationship and "the mental trauma and feelings of guilt that result from the inevitable conflicts" caused by detachment, and the second, a self-referential one about the Messianic mission of the modern artist in the sense of Friedrich Nietzsche, "his role in the world, and [...] the very essence of art". The two levels of interpretation are "interconnected by the significant role played by Picasso’s mother", who protected and adored her baby thus establishing some kind of cult of the divine child and by admiring her son and his first attempts "encouraged him to follow his way and reinforced him in his self-perception as a genius". The mother therefore can be seen as the representative of the artist‘s "first audience, fascinated by his early mastership of academic art." But to get an independent personality, and to fulfill his mission as a modern artist, for Picasso the detachment of both the mother and the incomprehending part of his audience that rejected his turn to modern art is needed. "As an answer to his confrontation with these difficulties, Picasso using further elements taken from the tradition of Christian art, for example the last supper, the resurrection, the veiled hands, presents himself both as Creator of a new art and its Messiah, who has come to comfort the suffering and redeem the world as a new Saviour, as a teacher of a new kind of seeing that frees from reality constraint. Thus, La Vie can be understood both as an answer to autobiographical experiences of the young Picasso and as a self-referential comment on his role as an artist and as an annotation on his fundamentally new art."

== Literature ==
- Reyes Jiménez de Garnica, Malén Gual (Edd.), Journey through the Blue. La Vie (Catalogue of the exhibition celebrated at Museu Picasso, Barcelona, October 10, 2013 to January 19, 2014). Institut de Cultura de Barcelona: Museu Picasso, Barcelona 2013. ISBN 978-84-9850-494-1
- William H. Robinson: Picasso and the Mysteries of Life: La Vie (Cleveland Masterworks 1). Giles, London 2012, ISBN 978-1-907804-21-2
- Johannes M. Fox: Vie, La. In: Johannes M. Fox: Picassos Welt. Ein Lexikon. Projekte-Verlag Cornelius, Halle 2008, vol. 2, pp. 1297–1299. ISBN 978-3-86634-551-5
- Raquel González-Escribano (Ed.), Picasso – Tradition and Avant-Garde. 25 years with Guernica (6 June - 4 September 2006 Museo Nacional del Prado, Museo Nacional Centro de Arte Reina Sofía). Museo Nacional del Prado, Museo Nacional Centro de Arte Reina Sofía, Madrid 2006, pp. 76–83. ISBN 978-84-8480-092-7
- Gereon Becht-Jördens/ Peter M. Wehmeier: ‘Touch me not!’ A gesture of detachment in Picasso’s La Vie as symbol of his self-concept as an artist, in: artnews.org
- Gereon Becht-Jördens/ Peter M. Wehmeier: Picasso und die christliche Ikonographie. Mutterbeziehung und künstlerisches Selbstverständnis. Reimer Verlag, Berlin 2003. ISBN 978-3-496-01272-6
- William H. Robinson: The Artist’s Studio in La Vie. Theater of Life and Arena of Philosophical Speculation. In: Michael FitzGerald (Ed.): The Artist’s Studio (Katalog Hartford, Cleveland 2001), Hartford 2001, pp. 63−87.
- Gereon Becht-Jördens/Peter M. Wehmeier: Noli me tangere! Mutterbeziehung, Ablösung und künstlerische Positionsbestimmung in Picassos Blauer Periode. Zur Bedeutung christlicher Ikonographie in „La Vie“. In: Franz Müller Spahn/Manfred Heuser/Eva Krebs-Roubicek (Edd.): Die ewige Jugend. Puer aeternus (Deutschsprachige Gesellschaft für Kunst und Psychopathologie des Ausdrucks, 33. Jahrestagung, Basel 1999), Basel 2000, pp. 76–86.
- Mary Mathews Gedo: The Archaeology of a Painting. A Visit to the City of the Dead beneath Picasso’s La Vie. In: Mary Mathews Gedo: Looking at Art from the Inside Out. The psychoiconographic Approach to Modern Art. Cambridge University Press, Cambridge u. a. 1994, pp. 87–118. ISBN 0-521-43407-6
- Marilyn McCully: Picasso und Casagemas. Eine Frage von Leben und Tod. In: Jürgen Glaesemer (Ed.): Der junge Picasso. Frühwerk und Blaue Periode (Catalogue Bern 1984), Zurich 1984, pp. 166–176.
