= Clovis Sagot =

French art dealer

Clovis Jules Sagot born on 14 July 1854 at Montlignon (now in Seine-et-Oise) and died 12 February 1913 at La Celle-Saint-Cloud (Yvelines), was a French art dealer.

== Biography ==
Clovis Sagot, who lived at 46, rue Laffitte in Paris, where he opened an art gallery, was one of the first dealers to recognise Picasso (together with other dealers such as Pedro Mañach, Ambroise Vollard, who was his neighbour, and Berthe Weill).

Before becoming an art dealer, Clovis Sagot had worked in the circus as a clown.

At his death in February 1913, Apollinaire wrote an obituary for him in the journal L'Intransigeant, in which he hailed Sagot as 'le père Tanguy' of the young painters of today, who had died at the very moment when the works that he had championed against all attacks had come to be celebrated. This opinion does not seem to have been shared across the board: 'le frère Sagot' (Sagot's brother), as he was nicknamed to differentiate him from his brother, Edmond Sagot known as 'Sagot the Younger' (bookseller and dealer in engravings in Paris from 1881) was also known by the sobriquet 'le sagouin'('bad boy', 'double-crosser') because of his rapacity.

Picasso's 1909 portrait of Clovis Sagot hangs in the Hamburger Kunsthalle.
