= Picasso's Rose Period =

Painting series by Pablo Picasso, 1904–07

Pablo Picasso, 1905, Acrobate et jeune Arlequin (Acrobat and Young Harlequin), oil on canvas, 191.1 x 108.6 cm, The Barnes Foundation, Philadelphia

The Rose Period (Spanish: Período rosa) comprises the works produced by Spanish painter Pablo Picasso between 1904 and 1906. It began when Picasso settled in Montmartre at the Bateau-Lavoir among Bohemian poets and writers. Following his Blue Period – which depicted themes of poverty, loneliness, and despair in somber, blue tones – Picasso's Rose Period represents more pleasant themes of clowns, harlequins and carnival performers, depicted in cheerful vivid hues of red, orange, pink and earth tones.

Based largely on intuition rather than direct observation, Picasso's Rose Period marks the beginning of the artist's stylistic experiments with primitivism; influenced by pre-Roman Iberian sculpture, Oceanic and African art. This led to Picasso's African Period in 1907, culminating in the Proto-Cubist Les Demoiselles d'Avignon, regarded as a masterpiece.

== Overview ==
Boy Leading a Horse, 1905–06, oil on canvas, 220.6 cm × 131.2 cm (86.9 in × 51.7 in), Museum of Modern Art, New York

The Rose Period lasted from 1904 to 1906. Picasso was happy in his relationship with Fernande Olivier whom he had met in 1904 and this has been suggested as one of the possible reasons he changed his style of painting. Harlequins, circus performers and clowns appear frequently in the Rose Period and populated Picasso's paintings at various stages throughout the rest of his long career. The harlequin, a comedic character usually depicted in checkered patterned clothing, became a personal symbol for Picasso.

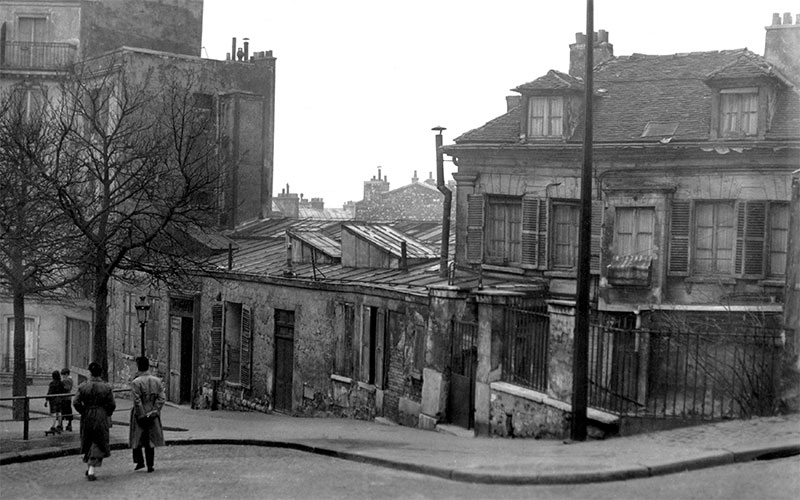
At the time Picasso lived at the Le Bateau-Lavoir (center) in Montmartre, Paris.

The Rose Period has been considered French influenced, while the Blue Period more Spanish influenced, although both styles emerged while Picasso was living in Paris. Picasso's Blue Period began in late 1901, following the death of his friend Carlos Casagemas and the onset of a bout of major depression. It lasted until 1904, when Picasso's psychological condition improved. The Rose Period is named after Picasso's heavy use of pink tones in his works from this period, from the French word for pink, which is rose.

Picasso's third highest selling painting, Young Girl with a Flower Basket, and his fifth highest, Garçon à la pipe (Boy with a pipe) were both painted during the Rose Period. Other significant Rose Period works include: Woman in a Chemise (Madeleine) (1904–05), The Actor (1904–1905), Lady with a Fan (1905), Two Youths (1905), Harlequin Family (1905), Harlequin's Family With an Ape (1905), La famille de saltimbanques (1905), Boy with a Dog (1905), Nude Boy (1906), Boy Leading a Horse (1905–06), and The Girl with a Goat (1906).

Pablo Picasso, 1904, L'acteur (The Actor), Metropolitan Museum of Art, New York

Pablo Picasso, 1905, Girl on a Ball, oil on canvas, 147 × 95 cm, Pushkin Museum, Moscow

Pablo Picasso, 1904–05, Les Baladins (Mother and Child, Acrobats), gouache on canvas, 90 × 71 cm, Staatsgalerie Stuttgart

Pablo Picasso, 1905, Maternité (Mother and Child), private collection

Pablo Picasso, 1905, Nus (Nudes), pencil on paper

Pablo Picasso, 1905, Acrobat's Family with a Monkey (Famille au Singe), collage, gouache, watercolor, pastel and India ink on cardboard, 104 × 75 cm, Göteborgs Konstmuseum, Gothenburg

Pablo Picasso, 1905, Young Girl with a Flower Basket, oil on canvas, 154.8 x 66.1 cm, private collection

Pablo Picasso, 1905, Garçon à la pipe, (Boy with a Pipe), private collection

Pablo Picasso, 1905, Lady with a Fan (Femme à l'éventail), oil on canvas, 100.3 × 81 cm, National Gallery of Art, Washington, D.C.

Pablo Picasso, 1905, Family of Saltimbanques, National Gallery of Art, Washington, D.C.

Pablo Picasso, 1905–06, Portrait of Gertrude Stein, oil on canvas, 100 x 81.3 cm Metropolitan Museum of Art, New York City

Pablo Picasso, 1905–06, Les deux frères (The two brothers), oil on canvas, 141.4 × 97.1 cm, Kunstmuseum Basel

Pablo Picasso, 1906, La Mort d'Arlequin (Death of Harlequin), gouache and pencil on board, 68.5 × 96 cm, private collection

Pablo Picasso, 1906, Nu aux mains serrées, gouache on canvas, 96.5 × 75.6 cm, Art Gallery of Ontario

== See also ==
- Picasso's Blue Period
- Picasso's African Period
- List of Picasso artworks 1901–1910

== Suggested reading ==
- Wattenmaker, Richard J.; Distel, Anne, et al. (1993). Great French Paintings from the Barnes Foundation. New York: Alfred A. Knopf. ISBN 0-679-40963-7
