= Acrobat and Young Harlequin =

Painting by Pablo Picasso

Pablo Picasso, Acrobat and Young Harlequin, 1905, oil on canvas, 191.1 x 108.6 cm, The Barnes Foundation in Philadelphia, Pennsylvania

Acrobat and Young Harlequin (French: Acrobate et jeune Arlequin) is a 1905 oil on canvas painting by Pablo Picasso. Painted toward the end of Picasso's Blue Period and the outset of his Rose Period, the work displays characteristics of both, with its melancholic subject and its blue and rose palette. Picasso created the painting while at the Le Bateau-Lavoir, his home and studio in Montmartre, Paris.

This painting by Picasso was published in the art and philosophy review Action, in March 1920.

Acrobat and Young Harlequin forms part of the permanent collection of The Barnes Foundation in Philadelphia, Pennsylvania.
