= Leo Stein =

American art collector and critic (1872–1947)

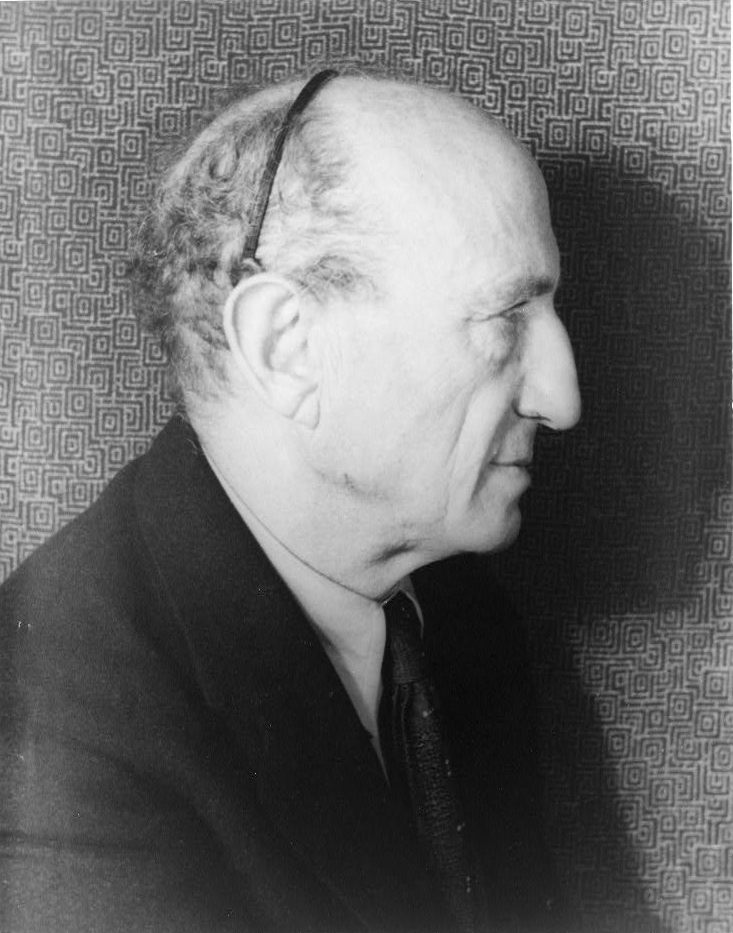
- Leo Stein (1872-1947), elder brother of Gertrude Stein. Photo by Carl Van Vechten, November 9, 1937
- Born: May 11, 1872; Allegheny, Pennsylvania, US
- Died: July 29, 1947 (aged 75); Florence, Italy
- Occupations: Art collector, Art critic
- Spouse: Nina Auzias (m. 1921)
- Relatives: Gertrude Stein (sister) - Michael Stein (art collector); Sarah Stein (sister-in-law): Allan Stein - 1895-1951 (nephew)

Leo Stein (May 11, 1872 – July 29, 1947) was an American art collector and critic. He was born in Allegheny City (now in Pittsburgh), the older brother of Gertrude Stein. He became an influential promoter of 20th-century paintings.

== Education and career ==
Beginning in 1892, he studied at Harvard University in Cambridge, Massachusetts, for two years. The following year, he traveled the world with his cousin, Fred. In 1897, he transferred to Johns Hopkins University in Baltimore, Maryland, where he graduated with a Bachelor of Arts degree in 1898.

Stein spent a number of years living in Paris with his sister. In 1914, the two separated due to Leo's resentment of Gertrude's infatuation with Alice B. Toklas, whom he described as "a kind of abnormal vampire." Stein returned to America to work as a journalist but eventually settled near Florence, Italy, with his long-time love interest, Nina Auzias. They eventually married in 1921.

Stein died of cancer in 1947 in Florence.

== Publications ==
- Stein, Leo. Appreciation: Painting, Poetry, and Prose. 1947. Reprint. University of Nebraska Press, 1996.
- Stein, Leo. The A-B-C of Aesthetics. New York: Boni & Liveright, 1927.
- Stein, Leo. "Pablo Picasso." The New Republic (April 23, 1924): p. 229-230.

== Sources ==
- Wineapple, Brenda. Sister Brother: Gertrude and Leo Stein. London: Putnam, 1996.
- Four Americans in Paris: The Collections of Gertrude Stein and Her Family. New York: Museum of Modern Art, 1970.
- Barnet, Andrea, "The Moderns". The New York Times. June 2, 1996. Retrieved July 22, 2012.
