= Picasso's Blue Period =

Art produced by Pablo Picasso from 1901 to 1904

1903, La Vie, Cleveland Museum of Art

The Blue Period (Spanish: Período Azul) comprises the works produced by Spanish painter Pablo Picasso between 1901 and 1904. During this time, Picasso painted essentially monochromatic paintings in shades of blue and blue-green, only occasionally warmed by other colors. These sombre works, inspired by Spain and painted in Barcelona and Paris, are now some of his most popular works, although he had difficulty selling them at the time.

This period's starting point is uncertain; it may have begun in Spain in the spring of 1901 or in Paris in the second half of the year. In choosing austere color and sometimes doleful subject matter—prostitutes, beggars and drunks—Picasso was influenced by a journey through Spain and by the suicide of his friend Carles Casagemas, who took his own life at the L'Hippodrome Café in Paris, France on February 17, 1901. Although Picasso himself later recalled, "I started painting in blue when I learned of Casagemas's death", art historian Hélène Seckel has written: "While we might be right to retain this psychologizing justification, we ought not lose sight of the chronology of events: Picasso was not there when Casagemas committed suicide in Paris ... When Picasso returned to Paris in May, he stayed in the studio of his departed friend, where he worked for several more weeks to prepare his exhibition for Vollard". The works Picasso painted for his show at Ambroise Vollard's gallery that summer were generally characterized by a "dazzling palette and exuberant subject matter". Picasso's psychological state worsened as 1901 continued.

In the latter part of 1901, Picasso sank into a severe depression and blue tones began to dominate his paintings. Picasso's painting La mort de Casagemas, completed early in the year following his friend's suicide, was done in hot, bright hues. The painting considered the first of his Blue Period, Casagemas in His Coffin, was completed later in 1901 when Picasso was sinking into a major depression. Picasso, normally an outgoing socializer, withdrew from his friends. Picasso's bout of depression was to last several years. Picasso's career had been promising before 1901 and early in that year he was making "a splash" in Paris. However, as he moved towards subject matter such as society's poor and outcast, and accented this with a cool, anguished mood with blue hues, the critics and the public turned away from his works. Members of the public were uninterested in displaying the Blue Period works in their homes. Picasso continued his output, but his financial situation suffered:

His pictures, not merely melancholy but profoundly depressed and cheerless, inspired no affection in the public or in buyers. It was not poverty that led him to paint the impoverished outsiders of society, but rather the fact that he painted them that made him poor himself.

From 1901 to 1903, he painted several posthumous portraits of Casagemas, culminating in the gloomy allegorical painting La Vie, painted in 1903 and now in the Cleveland Museum of Art. The same mood pervades the well-known etching The Frugal Repast (1904) which depicts a blind man and a sighted woman, both emaciated, seated at a nearly bare table. Blindness is a recurrent theme in Picasso's works of this period, also represented in The Blindman's Meal (1903, the Metropolitan Museum of Art) and in the portrait of Celestina (1903).

Other frequent subjects include female nudes and mothers with children. Solitary figures dominate his Blue Period works. Themes of loneliness, poverty and despair pervade the works as well. Possibly his most well known work from this period is The Old Guitarist. Other major works include Portrait of Soler (1903) and Las dos hermanas (1904).

Infrared spectroscopy of Picasso's 1901 painting The Blue Room reveals another painting beneath the surface.

Picasso's Blue Period was followed by his Rose Period. Picasso's bout with depression gradually ended, and as his psychological state improved, he moved towards more joyful, vibrant works, and emphasized the use of pinks ("rose" in French) and other warm hues to express the shift in mood and subject matter.

The painting Portrait of Suzanne Bloch (1904), one of the final works from this period, was stolen from the São Paulo Museum of Art (MASP) on December 20, 2007, but retrieved on January 8, 2008.

== Selected works ==
1901, The Blue Room, The Phillips Collection

1901, Le Gourmet (The Greedy Child), National Gallery of Art, Washington, D.C.

1901, Harlequin and his Companion (Les deux saltimbanques), oil on canvas, 73 x 60 cm, Pushkin Museum, Moscow

1901, Woman with a Cape, Cleveland Museum of Art, Cleveland, Ohio

1901–02, Femme aux Bras Croisés (Woman with Folded Arms)

1901–02, Le bock (Portrait de Jaime Sabartes), The Glass of Beer (Portrait of the Poet Sabartes), oil on canvas, 82 x 66 cm, Pushkin Museum, Moscow

Pablo Picasso, 1902, Woman with Bangs, 61.3 x 51.4 cm, The Baltimore Museum of Art, Maryland

1902–03, Femme assise (Melancholy Woman), oil on canvas, 100 x 69.2 cm, Detroit Institute of Arts, Michigan

1902–03, La soupe (The soup), oil on canvas, 38.5 x 46.0 cm, Art Gallery of Ontario, Toronto, Canada

1903, Desemparats (Maternité, Mère et enfant au fichu, Motherhood), pastel on paper, 47.5 x 41 cm, Museu Picasso, Barcelona

1904, Woman with a Helmet of Hair, gouache on tan wood pulp board, 42.7 x 31.3 cm, Art Institute of Chicago

1903, The Tragedy, National Gallery of Art, Washington, D.C.

1904, Portrait of Suzanne Bloch, São Paulo Museum of Art

== See also ==
- List of Picasso artworks 1901–1910
- Picasso's African Period
- Modern art

== Sources ==
- Cirlot, Juan-Eduardo (1972). Picasso: Birth of a Genius. New York and Washington: Praeger.
- Palermo, Charles (2011). Picasso's False Gods: Authority and Picasso's Early Work. nonsite.org 1 (February 2011).
- Wattenmaker, Richard J.; Distel, Anne, et al. (1993). Great French Paintings from the Barnes Foundation. New York: Alfred A. Knopf. ISBN 0-679-40963-7
- Becht-Jördens, Gereon; Wehmeier, Peter M. (2003). Picasso und die christliche Ikonographie. Mutterbeziehung und künstlerische Position. Berlin: Dietrich Reimer Verlag. ISBN 3-496-01272-2
