= The Blue Guitar (disambiguation) =

The Blue Guitar is a 1977 suite of twenty etchings with aquatint by David Hockney.

The Blue Guitar or Blue Guitar may also refer to:

== Literature ==
- The Blue Guitar (novel), a 2015 novel by John Banville
- The Man with the Blue Guitar, a 1937 poem by Wallace Stevens

== Music ==
- "Blue Guitar", a 1963 song written by Burt Bacharach and Hal David
- "Blue Guitar" (Justin Hayward and John Lodge song), from the 1975 album Blue Jays
- "Blue Guitar" (Celeste Buckingham song), 2011

== See also ==
- The Old Guitarist, a 1903–1904 oil painting by Pablo Picasso, during his Blue Period
- Blue Guitars, a 2005 album by Chris Rea
- Blue Guitars (Stephen Bishop album), 1996
- The Blue Guitar Sessions (Jesse Cook album), 2012
