= 347 Series =

Series of etchings by Pablo Picasso

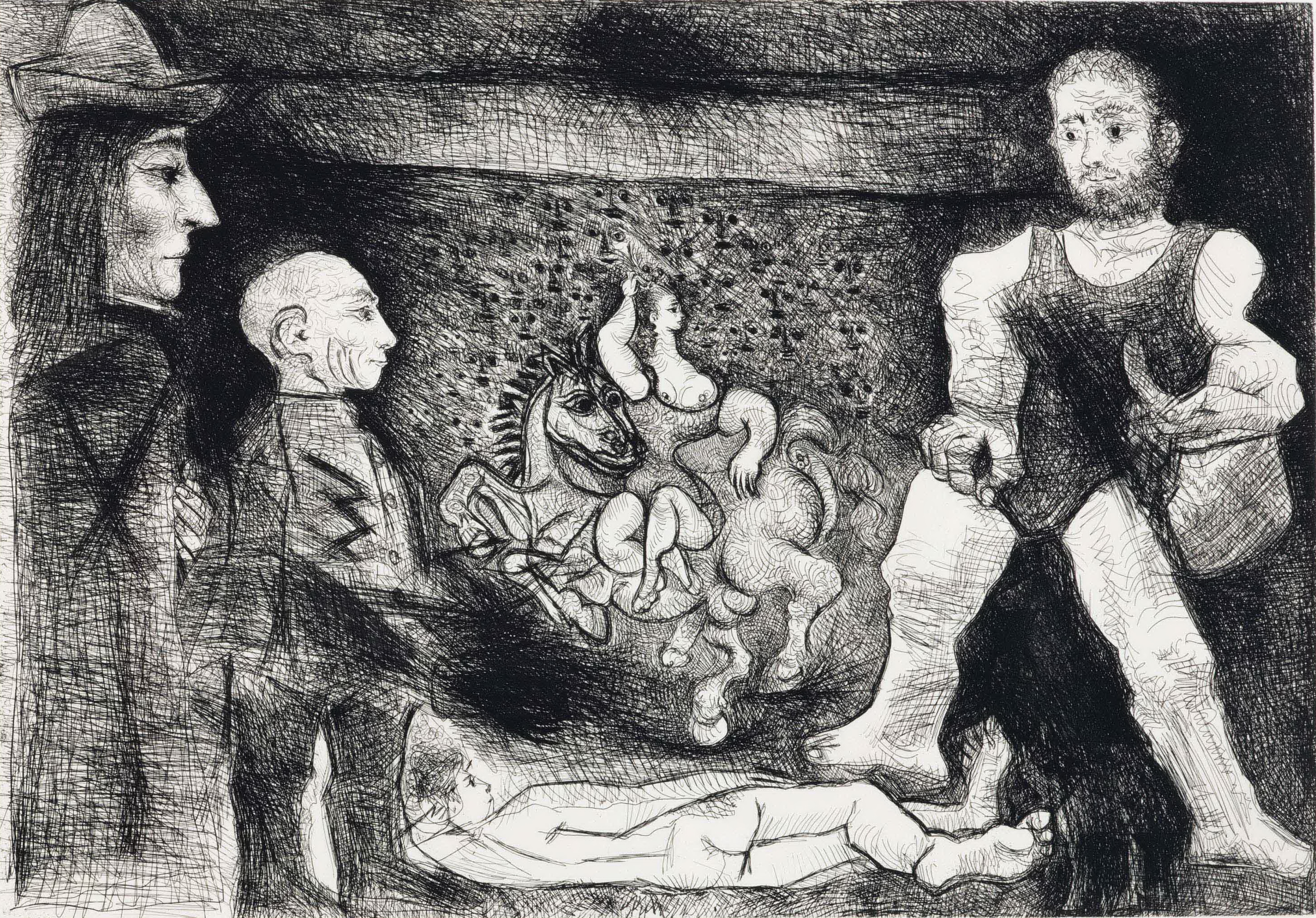
Picasso, son oeuvre, et son public, from the 347 Series

The 347 Series or 347 Suite is a series of etchings by the Spanish artist Pablo Picasso executed between March 16 and October 8 1968. The work was Picasso's largest in terms of the number of individual prints in the series; and his penultimate large etching series before the 156 Series of 1969-1972. It was dedicated to his friend Jamie Sabartes. No name was given by Picasso to the series. The 347 series was first displayed at the Art Institute of Chicago and Paris's Galerie Louise Leris in 1970.

Picasso was assisted by the Parisian printers Aldo and Piero Crommelynck, who had established an etching workshop near Picasso's Mougins residence.

== Collections ==
- National Museum in Oslo, Norway
- Picasso Museum in Barcelona, Spain
- Picasso Museum in Paris, France
- National Library of Paris, France
- The British Museum, United Kingdom
- Art Institute of Chicago, United States
- Museum Ludwig, Germany
- The Israel Museum, Jerusalem
- Gottfried Keller-Stiftung, Switzerland

Random House published a two volume boxed set of the 347 Series in 1970, published as Pablo Picasso: Suite 347.
