= Aldo Crommelynck =

Belgian master printmaker (1931–2008)

- Born: 26 December 1931; Monaco
- Died: 22 December 2008 (aged 76); Paris, France
- Education: Apprentice of Roger Lacourière
- Known for: Intaglio printmaking
- Awards: Chardin Prize 1953

Collaborations
- Henri Matisse: Visages (1948–52)
- Georges Braque: L’Ordre des Oiseaux (1962)
- Pablo Picasso: Le Cocu magnifique (1966); Series 60 (1966–68); 347 Series (1968); Series 156 (1970–72)
- David Hockney: The Blue Guitar (1973–75)
- Jasper Johns: Corpse and Mirror (1973–75); Foirades/Fizzles (1976); Land's End (1978–79)
- Jim Dine: Nancy Outside in July (1977–81)

Aldo Crommelynck (26 December 1931 – 22 December 2008) was a Belgian master printmaker who made intaglio prints in collaboration with many important European and American artists of the 20th century. At the time of his death, The Guardian termed Crommelynck the 'pre-eminent' and 'the most celebrated printmaker of the second half of the 20th century.'

== Family ==
Crommelinck was born in Monaco. His father was the Belgian playwright Fernand Crommelynck (1886–1970) and his mother was Anne Marie Le Tellier (1886–1970). They had four sons: Jean, Aldo, Piero (1934–2001), and Milan. Aldo's older brother, Jean, was a photographer and reporter. Fernand's theatrical masterpiece was Le Cocu magnifique (1920). He also made many black and white drawings of his family and friends.

Aldo's uncle, Albert Crommelynck, was a Belgian painter, set designer, muralist, printmaker, and writer. Albert's son Patrick (1942–1994) and his wife, Taeko Kuwata (1945–1994), formed the classical piano Duo Crommelynck, which was active from 1974 until July 9–10, 1994, when both performers committed suicide.

== Career ==
At age 17, in keeping with his family's artistic tradition, Aldo Crommelynck began an apprenticeship in Paris under the French printmaker Roger Lacourière, who was a family friend. Here, he worked with major artists: Fernand Léger, André Masson, Georges Rouault and Joan Miró. He also assisted Henri Matisse on the aquatint series Visages (1945–52) and formed a close relationship with Pablo Picasso.

In 1955, the Crommelynck brothers, Aldo, Piero and Milan, founded a workshop in Montparnasse. Soon, Atelier Crommelynck began to attract stellar clients; Miró, Le Corbusier, Jean Arp, and Alberto Giacometti came to work in the studio. Picasso left Lacourière for the new shop, on the strength of a single print Crommelynck had made of his 1952 gouache Le crâne de chevre sur la table ('Goat skull on a table'), with the unconventional choice of printing its white with white ink. There Georges Braque created a series of etchings and aquatints titled L'Ordre des Oiseaux (The Order of Birds), which was published in 1962, accompanying poetry by Saint-John Perse.

In 1963, Picasso decided that he needed a printmaker close to his house in the south of France at Mougins. In response, Aldo and Piero Crommelynck set up a studio nearby, where they helped him to create approximately 750 prints. Among these were illustrations for a version of Fernand's Le Cocu magnifique, and the Series 347 (1968), whose erotic images created a furor when they were exhibited simultaneously in Paris and Chicago in 1968. Even though the Art Institute of Chicago withheld 25 of the prints as "unfit for public consumption", it was deluged with complaints. Although this series has gained critical acceptance, it continues to generate controversy.

Aldo Crommelynck by a press at Pace Prints, circa 1990.

After Picasso died in 1973, Aldo and Piero Crommelynck returned to Paris, where their atelier attracted the established British artists: Richard Hamilton, David Hockney and Howard Hodgkin, as well as several younger American artists: Jim Dine, Jasper Johns and David Salle. After a falling out in 1986, Aldo opened a second print shop on his own in New York City, in partnership with Pace Prints.

From 1973 to 1976 Crommelynck collaborated closely with Hockney, instructing him in a number of etching techniques, including sugar lift and especially the use of wooden frames in multicolor prints. In culmination in 1976–77 Hockney created a portfolio of twenty etchings using Crommelynck's techniques called The Blue Guitar. The frontispiece read: "The Blue Guitar, Etchings By David Hockney Who Was Inspired By Wallace Stevens Who Was Inspired By Pablo Picasso". The etchings refer to themes of a poem by Stevens, The Man with the Blue Guitar. The portfolio was published by Petersburg Press in October 1977. That year, Petersburg also published a book, in which the images were accompanied by the poem's text.

Crommelynck had a close relationship with Dine, who said: "He taught me everything I know about etching", and with whom he collaborated on more than 100 prints. Among these were the 25-print series Nancy Outside in July (1977–81) and many prints derived from Dine's paintings of hearts and bathrobes. In 2007, Dine donated to the Bibliothèque nationale de France a nearly complete set of these prints. From 23 April until 17 June 2007, the Bibliothèque sponsored an exhibition, Aldo et moi, of prints selected from this set, and published a book which includes these images. In 2014 he was the subject of another paired exhibition and publication by the Bibliothèque, "From Picasso to Jasper Johns, the Atelier of Aldo Crommelynck" 8 April - 13 July 2014, and De Picasso à Jasper Johns: L'Atelier d'Also Crommelynck. In the early 1980s, Dine made a series of drawings, prints, and paintings that referred to the ornate iron gate at the entrance to Atelier Crommelynck at 172 rue de Grenelle, Paris. These activities culminated in the creation of a huge painted bronze sculpture, the Crommelynck Gate With Tools. In 2009, after Crommelynck's death, Enitharmon Press published a deluxe edition of Dine's reminiscences, Talking About Aldo, which includes a signed portrait etching. Two of Crommelynck's etching presses came to the US and are still in use, one at Wingate Studio (Hinsdale, NH), a fine art intaglio printing and publishing studio under the direction of master printer Peter Pettengill and the other at Mixit Print Studio, a professional monoprint/intaglio studio (Somerville MA).

== Selected collaborations ==
Artist	Project	Dates	References	Comments
Georges Braque	L’Ordre des Oiseaux	1962		book with St. John Perse
Jim Dine	Nancy Outside in July	1977–81		25 aquatints/etchings
David Hockney	The Blue Guitar	1973–75		inspired by Wallace Stevens
Jasper Johns	Corpse and Mirror	1973–75		
Jasper Johns	“Foirades/Fizzles”	1976		book with Samuel Beckett
Jasper Johns	Land's End	1978–79		
Henri Matisse	Visages	1948–52		apprenticed to Roger Lacourière
Pablo Picasso	Le Cocu magnifique	1966		to illustrate Fernand's play
Pablo Picasso	Series 60	1966–68		
Pablo Picasso	347 Series	1968		erotic images
Pablo Picasso	Series 156	1970–72		

== See also ==
- List of French artists
- List of printmakers
