= Modern poetry =

Modern poetry may refer to:

- The most recent periods in the history of poetry
- Modernist poetry, the application of modernist aesthetics to poetry
- Modern Poetry (poetry collection), a 2024 poetry collection by Diane Seuss

== See also ==
- "Of Modern Poetry", a poem by Wallace Stevens published in 1942
