= The Idea of Order at Key West =

Poem by Wallace Stevens

"The Idea of Order at Key West" is a poem written in 1934 by modernist poet Wallace Stevens. It is one of many poems included in his book, Ideas of Order. It was also included in The Collected Poems of Wallace Stevens for which he won the Pulitzer Prize for Poetry.

== History and context ==
"The Idea of Order at Key West" takes place on the island Key West in the state of Florida. Though the island was mostly isolated before the 1900s, its military post and the creation of a rail route to the mainland led to an increase in population and tourists. Many literary artists such as Ernest Hemingway and Robert Frost frequented Key West and drew inspiration from its environment; among them was Stevens, who met the two men on different occasions. As with many other poems of Stevens', "The Idea of Order at Key West" introduces dissonance between reality and perception. A common theme throughout his poems examines imagination and the concept of creating art.

== Summary ==
=== Overview ===
The narrator and his friend Ramon Fernandez watch as a woman "sang beyond the genius of the sea". As she sings, the narrator compares her voice to the ocean's; though the woman mimicked the ocean, "it was she and not the sea we heard". While he ponders this observation, the woman eventually leaves. Her singing left a strong impression on him: as he and friend turn towards the town, he sees the world differently.

=== Stanzas ===
Structurally, the poem is written in blank verse, in seven stanzas of various lengths. In the first three stanzas, the narrator observes how a woman sings the sounds she heard from the ocean. Though the woman "sang what she heard", the song and the ocean remain divided: the separation between the natural, inhuman and "veritable" ocean was too great for the woman's song to bridge. Despite the un-"medleyed sound", the men hear the woman over the ocean "for she was the maker of the song she sang". A central question of the poem ends the third stanza inquiring whose "spirit" the men heard.

In the fourth stanza, the narrator wonders at a world with "only the dark voice of the sea". The lack of other life leaves the natural world of the ocean barren and empty. He begins to see that there was "more" to the world than "her voice, and ours, among / The meaningless plungings of water and the wind".

In the fifth stanza, the structure of the poem changes slightly with a dropped line. (This is a line which completes the meter of the incomplete line which precedes it.) The narrator believes the woman to be "the single artificer of the world / In which she sang." Because she sang the sounds of the sea, both the ocean and she are now connected as creation and "maker".

In the sixth stanza, the narrator addresses his friend Ramon Fernandez when the woman stops her singing. (Note: Stevens claimed that he had combined two common Spanish names, unaware of the literary critic Ramón Fernández and essayist of the same name. Letters of Wallace James Stevens, p.789.) The two of them turn from the scene of the woman and the ocean towards the town instead. As the narrator watches the town, he is struck by how the lights "mastered the night and portioned out the sea".

In the final stanza, he cries out at the "maker's rage to order words of the sea" and how the "rage for order" connects to themselves and their origins.

== Analysis ==
Similar to many of his other poems, "The Idea of Order at Key West" is philosophically complex. Stated by critics as "perhaps impossible to interpret fully", the poem "affirms a transcendental poetic spirit yet cannot locate it". One critic has deemed the poem as "desperately" ambiguous, containing unresolvable difficulties. The ambiguity of ideas did not reflect Stevens' confusion or unease with ideas, but rather fostered interpretation by suggesting that the idea of order could not be raised without "the specter of disorder". The deconstruction of people and nature allows for an artistic interpretation of the poem. Jay Parini, who in 2011 ranked the poem second only to Walt Whitman's "Song of Myself" among all American poems ever written, interprets it as "[celebrating] the 'blessed rage for order' at the heart of all creative work."

The core of the poem lies on the interdependence of imagination and reality. Stevens stresses the "essential discontinuity between them" and emphasizes their differences by "demonstrating the vain struggle of the imagination 'to grasp what it beholds in a single version of it". This interpretation is remarkable because in the same collection of poems, Ideas of Order, Stevens "interrogates this ordering imagination with skepticism" yet celebrates it in "The Idea of Order at Key West".

Though the majority of the poem focuses on the woman singer and the song, the narrator and his friend also participate in the creation of art: through his narration itself and through its effects on him which transforms his perception of reality. The narrator uses the woman's song to help himself reconstruct a world of his own reality from the chaos of the "water [that] never formed to mind or voice". Perhaps she is the creative spirit of the island itself; the muse that brings order to the chaos of the wind, and the sea, and to creativity.
