= The Blue Room (Picasso) =

Painting by Pablo Picasso

- French: La chambre bleue
- Artist: Pablo Picasso
- Year: 1901
- Medium: Oil on canvas
- Movement: Blue Period
- Dimensions: 50.48 cm × 61.59 cm (20 in × 24 in)
- Location: The Phillips Collection
- Website: www.phillipscollection.org/collection/blue-room

The Blue Room (French: La chambre bleue) is a 1901 oil on canvas painting by Pablo Picasso, which he painted during his Blue Period. It depicts a scene of a nude woman bending over in a bath tub. A hidden painting was revealed beneath the surface by x-ray images and infra-red scans, showing a portrait of a bearded man. The painting has been housed in The Phillips Collection, in Washington D.C. since 1927.

== Background ==
The Blue Room is considered to be one of the earliest examples of a work from Picasso's Blue Period. This was an important period in his life when he moved to Paris from Barcelona and showed his paintings at his first solo exhibition at the Vollard Gallery in 1901. Picasso's Blue Period is defined by the artist's preoccupation with images of human suffering, a subject matter that he conveyed in shades of blue.

This was a period of great emotional turmoil for the young artist. Throughout these early years, beginning in 1901, when Picasso was just 19 years old, he lived in poverty in Paris as a struggling artist. He also experienced the loss of his close friend, the Spanish poet Carles Casagemas, who committed suicide by shooting himself in the head at a dinner party. Picasso felt the loss of his friend deeply and this tragic event is considered to have been a major influence on his artwork which became dominated by sombre blue and green hues. Picasso said to his friend Pierre Daix, "It was thinking about Casagemas that got me started painting in blue". During his Blue Period, Picasso favoured creating portraits of the poor, lonely and suffering, such as prostitutes, destitute people and intoxicated people on the street, and his paintings were designed to convey the hardship endured by the subject. This period of pessimism would later be replaced by a more positive era known as the Rose Period.

== Description ==
The Blue Room depicts a scene of a nude woman in the process of bathing. The painting's title reflects the predominant use of blue shades throughout the painting.

The image of the woman's bedroom is particularly notable, as it offers some insight into Picasso's own living quarters at the time. The setting for this painting was Picasso's own studio apartment, situated at 130 boulevard de Clichy. The apartment was located on the top floor and was extremely small, consisting of just two rooms. The Blue Room presents a visual idea of the interior of this apartment and the view from the window. The painting shows that the studio was also used as a living room, bedroom and bathroom. Several pictures can be seen hanging on the walls of the apartment, including a seascape, reflecting Picasso's growing number of canvases and general disorder in real life.

The composition was influenced by works by Edgar Degas and Henri de Toulouse-Lautrec, which is illustrated by the poster May Milton (1895) by Toulouse-Lautrec, seen hanging on the wall in the painting.

== Hidden painting ==
Since the 1950s, there had been speculation that the painting had something hidden beneath its surface after a conservator at The Philips Collection noticed inconsistencies in the brushwork. A hidden painting was later confirmed in 1997 by x-ray images. When infra-red scans were carried out on the painting in 2008, a portrait of a bearded man wearing a bow tie was revealed beneath the surface. The man is depicted in a seated position, with his right hand touching his cheek. In 2014, art experts from The Phillips Collection, the National Gallery of Art, Cornell University, and Winterthur Museum consolidated their research and concluded that Picasso had painted both images in haste in the summer of 1901.

Picasso painted The Blue Room at a period in his life when he was still a struggling, impoverished artist. Although he was a prolific artist in his youth, his melancholy blue paintings of poor people did not create much interest from buyers. He could not, therefore, afford to purchase new canvases for every new idea and instead reused existing ones.

== Technical analysis ==
In 2017, a research report was published following a comprehensive technical study of the painting. The study used multiple methods, including the microanalysis of paint samples, reflectance imaging spectroscopy and synchrotron radiation x-ray fluorescence mapping to analyse the materials used and the structure of the paint layers. The investigation confirmed the existence of the hidden portrait beneath the surface layer and specifically, identified a red flower located on the white shirt of the man in the earlier portrait, which could be used to identify the subject.

A visual examination revealed that the existing painting was thinly painted over a heavier texture of underlying paint layers. Patches in areas of the painting reveal other colours that are visible beneath the surface. These pre-existing colours suggest that Picasso painted over the previous painting without applying an intermediate ground layer. The visible texture of hidden brushstrokes suggests that the original painting was finished and dry when Picasso painted over it. There was also a lack of varnish and dirt between the layers, which suggests that Picasso painted the second composition soon after the first, within the space of a few months.

Further analysis showed that Picasso employed a wide palette of vivid pigments in the composition, including vermilion, viridian, chrome yellow, and cadmium yellow. He used predominantly Prussian blue for the blue areas, mixed with zinc white to apply a variety of blue tones to the painting.

== Significance and legacy ==
Patricia Favero, associate conservator at The Phillips Collection, remarked, "This painting 'The Blue Room' is very important in (Picasso's) early work. It's considered an early Blue Period painting. To find this painting underneath - which we think was painted in the same year, just earlier in the year and it's completely different in style - it gives us some insight into Picasso's development over the course of that year."

== See also ==
- La Gommeuse
- Femme aux Bras Croisés
- The Old Guitarist
- List of Picasso artworks 1901–1910
- 1901 in art

== Sources ==
- McQuillan, Melissa. “Picasso, Pablo.” Grove Art Online, Oxford Art Online. Accessed 23 March 2015
- Schneider, Daniel E. “The Painting of Pablo Picasso: A Psychoanalytic Study.” College Art Journal 7, no. 2(Winter, 1947): 82.
