= The Auroras of Autumn =

1950 poetry book by Wallace Stevens

- First edition
- Author: Wallace Stevens
- Language: English
- Genre: Poetry
- Publisher: Alfred A. Knopf
- Publication date: September 1950
- Publication place: United States
- Media type: Print
- Preceded by: Transport to Summer
- Followed by: Collected Poems

The Auroras of Autumn is a 1950 book of poetry by Wallace Stevens. The book of poems contains the long poem of 10 cantos by Stevens of the same name.

== Contents ==
The book features a collection of poems containing also the 1948 Stevens long poem of the same name, whose title refers to the aurora borealis, or the "Northern Lights", in the fall. The book collects 32 Stevens poems written between 1947 and 1950, and was his last collection before his 1954 Collected Poems.

The title poem of the book is 240 lines long and divided into ten cantos of 24 lines each. It is considered one of Stevens' more challenging and "difficult" works, and a 20th-century example of the English Romantic tradition. According to critic Harold Bloom, it is Stevens' only major poem "in which he allows himself to enter in his proper person, as a kind of dramatic figure." On this reading, the poem comes to an early climax at the end of canto VI, where Stevens describes a tension between his own imagination and a disintegrative and elusive reality, his subject:

This is nothing until in a single man contained,
Nothing until this named thing nameless is
And is destroyed. He opens the door of his house

On flames. The scholar of one candle sees
An Arctic effulgence flaring on the frame
Of everything he is. And he feels afraid.

Another notable poem in the book is "The Owl in the Sarcophagus", an elegy for Stevens' best friend, Henry Church.

== Awards ==
It won the 1951 National Book Award for Poetry.
