= The Old Guitarist =

Painting by Pablo Picasso

- Artist: Pablo Picasso
- Year: 1903–04
- Medium: Oil on panel
- Movement: Picasso's Blue Period, Expressionism
- Dimensions: 122.9 cm × 82.6 cm (48.4 in × 32.5 in)
- Location: Art Institute of Chicago

The Old Guitarist is an oil painting by Pablo Picasso, which he created in late 1900 and early 1901. It depicts an elderly musician, a haggard man with threadbare clothing, who is hunched over his guitar while playing in the streets of Barcelona, Spain. It is on display at the Art Institute of Chicago as part of the Helen Birch Bartlett Memorial Collection.

At the time of The Old Guitarist's creation, Modernism, Impressionism, Post-Impressionism, and Symbolism had greatly influenced Picasso's style. Furthermore, El Greco, Picasso's poor standard of living, and the suicide of his dear friend Carlos Casagemas influenced Picasso's style at the time which came to be known as his Blue Period. Several x-rays, infrared images and examinations by curators revealed three different figures hidden behind the old guitarist.

== Background ==
At the time, having renounced his classical and traditional education and searching for fame, Picasso and his friend Carlos Casagemas moved to Paris. A year later, Casagemas became hopelessly miserable from a failed love affair and committed suicide. Picasso was greatly afflicted by this event and was soon depressed and desolate. In addition, Picasso was very poor. His poverty made him identify and relate to beggars, prostitutes and other downtrodden outcasts in society.

These events and circumstances were the impetus for the beginning of Picasso's Blue Period which lasted from 1901 to 1904. The Blue Period is identified by the flat expanses of blues, greys and blacks, melancholy figures lost in contemplation, and a deep and significant tragedy. After the Blue Period came Picasso's Rose Period, and eventually, the Cubism movement which Picasso co-founded.

== Analysis ==
Elements of The Old Guitarist were carefully chosen to generate a reaction from the spectator. For example, the monochromatic color scheme creates flat, two-dimensional forms that dissociate the guitarist from time and place. In addition, the overall muted blue palette creates a general tone of melancholy and accentuates the tragic and sorrowful theme. The sole use of oil on panel causes a darker and more theatrical mood. Oil tends to blend the colors together without diminishing brightness, creating an even more cohesive dramatic composition.

Furthermore, the guitarist, although muscular, shows little sign of life and appears to be close to death, implying little comfort in the world and accentuating the misery of his situation. Details are eliminated and scale is manipulated to create elongated and elegant proportions while intensifying the silent contemplation of the guitarist and a sense of spirituality. The large, brown guitar is the only significant shift in color found in the painting; its dull brown, prominent against the blue background, becomes the center and focus. The guitar comes to represent the guitarist's world and only hope for survival. This blind and poor subject depends on his guitar and the small income he can earn from his music for survival. Some art historians believe this painting expresses the solitary life of an artist and the natural struggles that come with the career. Therefore, music, or art, becomes a burden and an alienating force that isolates artists from the world. And yet, despite the isolation, the guitarist (artist) depends on the rest of society for survival. All of these emotions reflect Picasso's predicament at the time and his criticism of the state of society. The Old Guitarist becomes an allegory of human existence.

Paul Mariani, a biographer of Wallace Stevens, presented his analysis of the painting as a counterpoint to objections raised by Stevens concerning the origin of his 1937 poem titled The Man With the Blue Guitar stating,

"Despite his repeatedly denying it, Stevens does seem to have a particular painting in mind here: Picasso's 1903 The Old Guitarist, which portrays an old man with white hair and beard sitting distorted and cross-legged as he plays his guitar. If Picasso attempted to portray the world of poverty and abject misery, it was because that had been his own plight as a struggling young artist in Barcelona, where he painted many pictures including this one, of the poor. The painting is almost entirely done in monochromatic blues and blue-blacks, except for the guitar itself, which is painted in a slightly warmer brown. The man is blind but, no longer seeing the world around him, he sees more deeply into the reality within."

In The Old Guitarist, Picasso may have drawn upon George Frederic Watts's 1886 painting of Hope, which similarly depicts a hunched, helpless musician with a distorted angular form and predominantly blue tone.

== Infrared discoveries ==
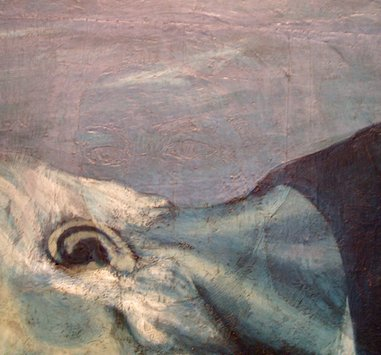
Detail showing an image beneath

Recent x-rays and examinations by curators found three figures peering behind the old guitarist's body. The three figures are an old woman with her head bent forward, a young mother with a small child kneeling by her side, and an animal on the right side of the canvas. Despite unclear imagery in crucial areas of the canvas, experts determined that at least two different paintings are found beneath The Old Guitarist.

In 1998, researchers used an infrared camera to penetrate the uppermost layer of paint (the composition of The Old Guitarist) and clearly saw the second-most composition. By using this camera, researchers were able to discover a young mother seated in the center of the composition, reaching out with her left arm to her kneeling child at her right, and a calf or sheep on the mother's left side. Clearly defined, the young woman has long, flowing dark hair and a thoughtful expression.

The Art Institute of Chicago shared its infrared images with the Cleveland Museum of Art and the National Gallery of Art in Washington, D.C., where curator William Robinson identified a sketch by Picasso sent to his friend Max Jacob in a letter. It revealed the same composition of mother and child, but it had a cow licking the head of a small calf. In a letter to Jacob, Picasso reveals he was painting this composition a few months before he began The Old Guitarist. Despite these discoveries, the reason Picasso did not complete the composition with a mother and child, and how the older woman fitted into the history of the canvas, remain unknown.

In 2019, researchers at University College London used a neural network to recreate the painting found by infrared camera. The neural network was trained to recreate the painting from other works of Picasso during his Blue Period.

== In popular culture ==
As one of Picasso's more notable Blue Period works, The Old Guitarist has influenced other artists of all backgrounds. For example, Paul McCartney was inspired from a copy of the painting hanging on a wall to create a chord progression. This progression and McCartney's accompanying melody were his contributions to the 2015 Kanye West song "All Day".

The Old Guitarist is also referenced in the Counting Crows song "Mr. Jones". The speaker alludes to this painting in the third verse of the song: "You know gray is my favorite color/I felt so symbolic yesterday/If I knew Picasso/ I would buy myself a gray guitar and play ".

== See also ==
- The Man With the Blue Guitar, 1937 Wallace Stevens poem
- The Blue Guitar, 1976–77 suite of etchings by David Hockney
- The Blue Room
- Femme aux Bras Croisés
- List of Picasso artworks 1901–1910

== Sources ==
- Rimer, Bonnie. The Old Guitarist Meets New Technology. Rep. The Art Institute of Chicago, 2001. Web. 25 Feb. 2011
- "Picasso's Musical Instruments: Blue Period Music: The Old Guitarist." Princeton University Blog Service. Web. 10 Mar. 2011
- "Pablo Ruiz Picasso Painting The Old Guitarist - TheArtistPabloPicasso.com." The Artist Pablo Picasso Art and Biography - Theartistpablopicasso.com. Web. 10 Mar. 2011
- "Symbolism." SJSU Digital Art Lobby. Web. 10 Mar. 2011
