= The Blue Guitar =

1977 suite of 20 etchings in colour by David Hockney

- Frontispiece from The Blue Guitar (1976–77)
- Artist: David Hockney
- Year: 1976–77 (drawn); 1977 (printed, published)
- Catalogue: S.A.C. 199-218; MCA Tokyo 178-197
- Medium: 20 Etchings (soft-ground and hard-ground) with aquatint (sugar-lift) on Inveresk mould-made paper, within an embossed grey leather covered box
- Subject: The Man with the Blue Guitar poem by Wallace Stevens; Pablo Picasso; homage; The Old Guitarist; Suite; poetry
- Dimensions: Plate: 42.5 × 34.5 cm (16 3/4 × 13 5/8 in.); Sheet: 53 × 46 cm (20 7/8 × 18 1/8 in.); Portfolio: 55.5 × 48.5 × 4 cm (21 7/8 × 19 1/8 × 1 5/8 in.)
- Location: ≥14 public collections worldwide

Collaborators
- Taught by: Aldo Crommelynck, Paris; (sugar-lift aquatint)
- Proofed by: Maurice Payne
- Editioned by: Richard Spare, London; Dany Levy; Jennifer Melby, New York; Prawatt Laucharoen
- Fabricator: Rudolf Rieser, Cologne
- Publisher: Petersburg Press, London and New York
- Website: hockney.com/the-blue-guitar

The Blue Guitar is a suite of twenty etchings with aquatint by David Hockney, drawn in 1976–77 and published in 1977 in London and New York by Petersburg Press.

The frontispiece to the portfolio mentions Hockney's dual inspirations:

"The Blue

Guitar

Etchings by

David Hockney

who was inspired

by

Wallace Stevens

who was inspired

by

Pablo Picasso"

== Context ==
In 1976 Henry Geldzahler introduced Hockney to Wallace Stevens' 1937 poem, The Man with the Blue Guitar, which used Picasso's Blue period painting The Old Guitarist (1903–04) as its central theme. Hockney produced a number of drawings in response to the poem, which highlights the problem of the imagination's role in interpreting reality, and produced a set of coloured etchings using the method devised by Aldo Crommelynck for Picasso to make colour prints. Hockney said his illustrations "like the poem, they are about transformations within art as well as the relation between reality and the imagination, so these are pictures within pictures and different styles of representation juxtaposed and reflected and dissolved within the same frame. Wallace Stevens (1879–1955) began writing poetry in his 40s, and, while never a popular poet, is counted one of North America's most influential poets of the 20th century."

"I read Wallace Steven's poem in the summer of 1976. The etchings themselves were not conceived as literal illustrations of the poem but as an interpretation of its themes in visual terms. Like the poem, they are about transformations within art as well as the relation between reality and the imagination, so these are pictures and different styles of representation juxtaposed and reflected and dissolved within the same frame." — David Hockney

(Artist's statement on dust-jacket of the accompanying catalogue documenting the publication of The Blue Guitar suite of etchings).

== Timeline ==
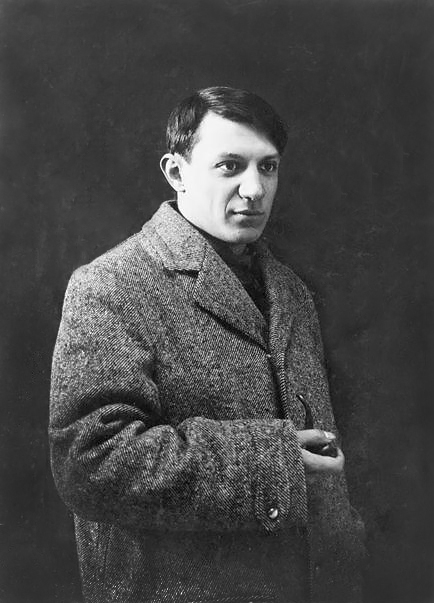
Pablo Picasso, 1908

=== 1973 ===
==== Death of Picasso ====
Pablo Picasso died in Mougins, France on 8 April 1973, age 91.

==== Hockney in Paris: A Pilgrimage ====
Hockney moves to Paris in the autumn of 1973, where Picasso had lived for most of his life.

"Paris is very pleasant. For the first time in years I can have eight hours a day painting alone with no disturbances. The telephone only seems to ring two or three times and it's usually only friends arranging dinner. I've started a few French lessons but my progress is slow, and after a hard day painting it's a little hard to concentrate, but I intend to slog at it." — David Hockney

==== Crommelynck ====
Aldo Crommelynck with a press at Pace Prints, circa 1990

Hockney befriends Picasso's Master printmaker, Aldo Crommelynck at his studio, Atelier Crommelynck.

"It was thrilling to meet someone who had such direct contact with Picasso and worked with him such a lot. Aldo Crommelynck taught me marvelous technical things about etching." — David Hockney

Hockney creates The Student: Homage to Picasso (1973) with Crommelynck, in the spirit of Picasso's renowned Vollard Suite (1930−37) commissioned by the publisher Propyläen-Verlag (Berlin), to honour Picasso as part of a commemorative portfolio Homage to Picasso (Hommage à Picasso) In the process, Crommelynck teaches his signature technique to Hockney, the Sugar lift aquatint, which enables brush marks to be recreated on the etched plate, a technique Crommelynck had previously kept secret to use exclusively and extensively with Picasso for the two decades prior.

=== 1974 ===
Hockney then creates a small suite in two colours (red and blue) with Crommelynck combining the two techniques, entitled Gustave Flaubert: A Simple Heart (1974) after the 1877 novella A Simple Heart, (also published as A Simple Soul), by Gustave Flaubert. Here Crommelynck imparted another of his previously secret techniques to Hockney, how to use a single plate for multi-coloured etchings, rather than having to register separate plates for each colour. (Both this technique and the sugar lift were revelations for Hockney and proved essential to the genesis of his later 'Blue Guitar' prints).

==== Return to London ====
Hockney returns to London and teaches his friend and master printmaker Maurice Payne both of the Crommelynck techniques, resulting in the artwork Showing Maurice the Sugar Lift (1974).

Other images created at this time include Artist and Model (1973–74) which contrasts etching techniques Hockney employed before and after Crommelynk's tutorage, and Contrejour in the French style (1974), both published by Petersburg Press, London.

=== 1976 ===
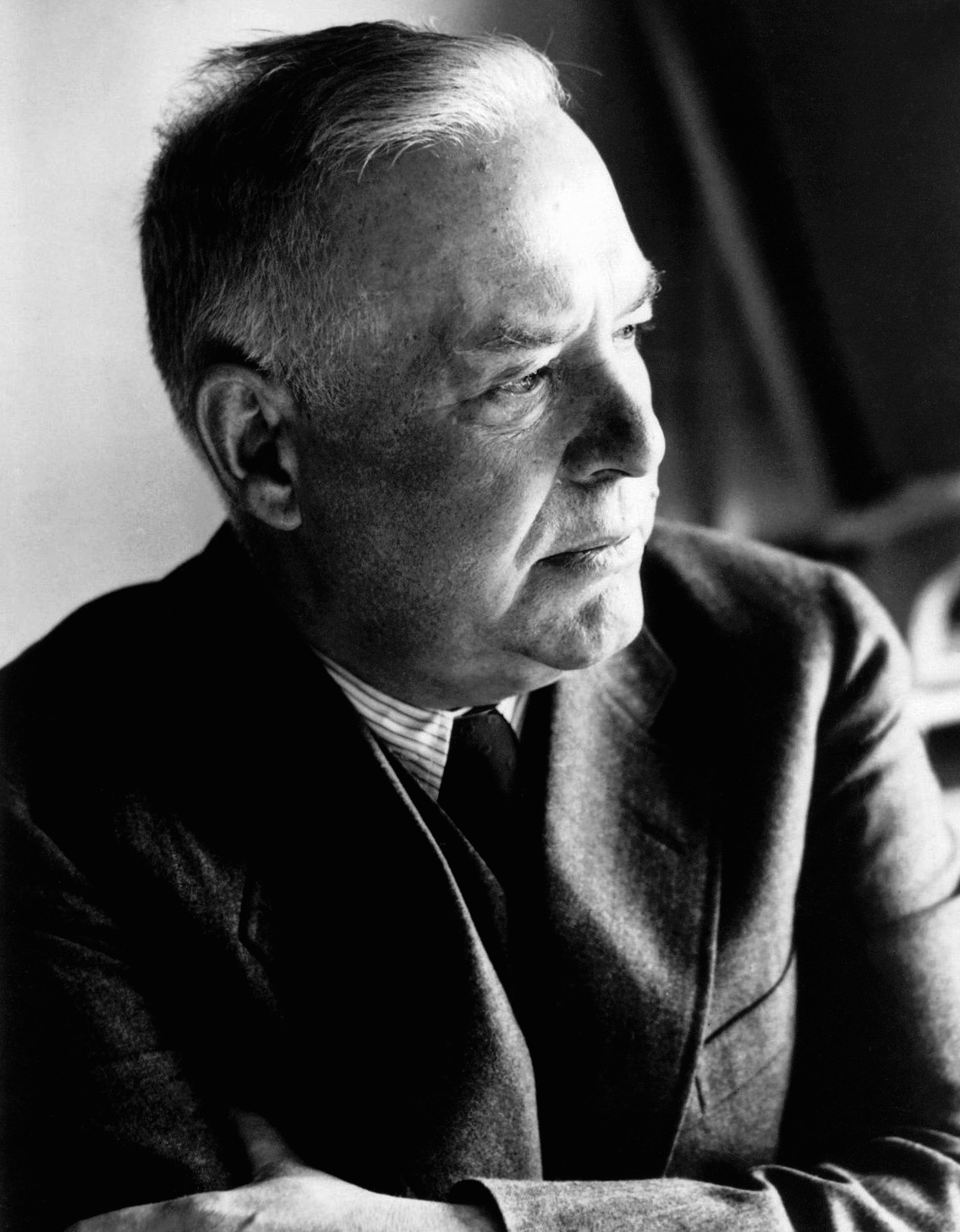
American modernist poet Wallace Stevens, 1948

==== Summer 1976 ====
Hockney's regular summer companion, the curator Henry Geldzahler introduced Hockney to the modernist poet Wallace Stevens' poem, The Man with the Blue Guitar, in the summer of 1976, while holidaying together on Fire Island, NY, along with the writer Christopher Isherwood.

"When I first read The Man with the Blue Guitar, I wasn't quite sure what it was about, like all poems like that, but I loved the rhythms in it and some of the imagery, just the choice of words is marvellous. Then, when I read it out loud, I loved it even more, because I got the music that it has." — David Hockney

==== Autumn 1976 – March 1977 ====
After a series of ink drawings, Hockney draws the twenty etchings in London, collaborating with friend and master printmaker Maurice Payne at Petersburg Press.

Stevens's meditation on Picasso's painting The Old Guitarist (1903–04), leads Hockney to paint additional reflections in his London painting studio, resulting in Model with Unfinished Self Portrait (1977) which shows Gregory Evans lying asleep in front of painting Self Portrait with Blue Guitar (1977), oil on canvas.

"My self portrait, which was not finished at the time, was leaning against the wall of my London studio. Gregory posed on a bed in front of it and a great deal of his figure was painted from life. That gave it a kind of power. It looks as though it's a painting of two completely different kinds of space. It seems as if there's a stage behind Gregory with a curtain. The curtain has been pulled back and there I am, about to draw a guitar." — David Hockney

=== 1977 ===
Photograph of David Hockney painting Gregory Evans in London, 1977

==== March 1977 – September 1977 ====
Editioning by Richard Spare and Dany Levy in London, who had first choice of the images, with Jennifer Melby and Prawatt Laucharoen editioning in New York. Each image is handprinted from two copper plates and inked by hand from a selection of five colours, red, yellow, blue, green and black.

Once editioned, the 40 plates were "cancelled" by punching holes through them, destroying their ability to produce the artis' intended image. A "cancellation proof" was then printed for each image to prove that the plates were no longer able to produce the artist's intended image, and so assure buyers of the rarity of the limited edition. On behalf of the artist, Petersburg Press then donated both the Cancellation Proofs and the forty cancelled plates to the permanent collection of the Museum of Modern Art in New York.

==== October 1977 ====
Publication by Petersburg Press Ltd. simultaneously in London (59a Portobello Road, W11) and New York (17 East 74th Street, NY 10021).

=== 1979 ===
==== Apr 10 – Jul 10, 1979 ====
(Left to Right) The two cancelled plates for Serenade, and a comparison between the etching Serenade from the suite and the cancellation proof of Serenade.

David Hockney: The Blue Guitar exhibition at the Museum of Modern Art, April 10 – July 10, 1979.

The Museum of Modern Art holds a solo exhibition dedicated to the suite in the Sachs Galleries, titled David Hockney: The Blue Guitar. Alongside the twenty prints, two cancelled copper plates and five black and white cancellation proofs are also exhibited.

== The Suite ==
The Blue Guitar (1976–77), David Hockney

The suite consists of twenty-one loose-leaved sheets in a grey leather covered box. The etchings are interleaved with tracing paper guard sheets.

=== Prints ===
Published as loose sheets with a table of contents / colophon sheet, all contained within a leather-covered portfolio, embossed with the title 'The Blue Guitar'. Each print is signed and numbered out of 200 in pencil, by the artist (there were also 35 Artist's proofs numbered in Roman numerals).

=== Colophon ===
"This portfolio contains twenty etchings drawn by David Hockney in London in the Autumn of 1976 and Spring of 1977. These were proofed by Maurice Payne each from two copper plates, 34.5 x 42.5 cm, inked from a selection of five colours: red, yellow, blue, green and black. The paper was mould made at the Inveresk Mill in Somerset and torn to a finished size of 46 cm x 53 cm. The justification pages have been set in Electra Linotype and printed letterpress. The editions were printed by hand in London and New York at the Petersburg Studios, and are presented in a box bound in leather at the workshop of Rudolf Rieser in Cologne. Each of the etchings has been stamped on the reverse with the title and signed by the artist, two hundred numbered 1 to 200 and thirty-five proofs numbered I to XXXV. Published in October 1977 by the Petersburg Press" -- colophon.

=== Table of contents ===
On the reverse of the colophon sheet, is a table of contents displaying the Title and Mediums, shown in the table of etchings above.

=== Case ===
Fabricated in Cologne by Rudolf Rieser, the case is bound in grey leather and embossed with the title 'The Blue Guitar'.

Example at the National Gallery of Art
Colophon	Table of contents	Case
Colophon from The Blue Guitar	Table of contents from The Blue Guitar	Leather bound case embossed with the title The Blue Guitar

== Accompanying publications ==
=== Catalogue ===
The accompanying catalogue published by Petersburg Press, 1977

A small-format facsimile edition catalogue, containing reproductions of the etchings, and additionally containing the full text of Wallace Stevens' poem, was published simultaneously with the suite.

"This catalogue documents the publication of 'The Blue Guitar', a group of etchings by David Hockney, accompanied here by a poem of Wallace Stevens 'The Man with the Blue Guitar". The portfolio contains twenty etchings drawn by the artist in London in the Autumn of 1976 and Spring of 1977"

Hardback. Dimensions 21.5 x 21.5 cm.

Typeset in 11pt Electra Linotype, printed in England on Abbey Mills laid paper by The Scolar Press.

== Public Collections ==
Complete Examples held in Public Collections
Institution	Ed. #	Notes	External Links to Images (if available)	Ref.
Art Institute of Chicago	107/200	[Accession Numbers: 1978.23.1-21] Held alongside Picasso's The Old Guitarist (late 1903–early 1904) [Accession Number: 1926.253]	View All	
Bibliothèque nationale de France		[Notice Number: FRBNF40336269]		
British Council		[Accession Numbers: P3257, P4028-39, P4041-45, P4047, P5054]	View All	
Cartwright Hall Art Gallery		"Cartwright Hall Art Gallery holds the four major series of prints produced by David Hockney; Six Fairy Tales from the Brothers Grimm, The Blue Guitar, A Rake's Progress and Illustrations of the Poetry of C. P. Cavafy."		
Fine Arts Museums of San Francisco		[Accession Numbers: 2016.15.8.1-20]		
McNay Art Museum	118/200	[Accession Numbers: 1978.3.1-20]	View All	
Metropolitan Museum of Art		[Accession Number: 1978.518]		
Museum of Contemporary Art Tokyo	A.P. XIII/XXXV	[Accession Numbers: 1994-00-1047-000 to 1994-00-1066-000]	View All	
Museum of Modern Art	41/200	[Object Numbers: 437.1977.1-20]	View All	
Museum of Modern Art	Cancellation Proof	[Object Numbers: 626.1978.1-20]	View All	
Museum of Modern Art	Cancelled Plates	[Object Number: 627.1978.1.a-]		
National Art Library	2/200	[OCLC Number/UI: 913266745]		
National Gallery of Art	18/200	[Accession Numbers: 1991.60.1-20]	View All	
National Gallery of Australia	99/200	[Accession Numbers: 77.177.1-20]	View All	
The David Hockney Foundation		"The Foundation owns more than 8,000 works of art by David Hockney. The collection holds the editioned works (lithographs, etchings, screen prints, home made prints, ...) [of David Hockney]"		
National Museum of Art, Osaka		[Object Numbers: 40802-40821]		

Incomplete Examples held in Public Collections
Institution	Ed. #	Notes	External Links to Images (if available)	Ref.
Bilbao Fine Arts Museum		Six prints from the suite.	View All	
Cincinnati Art Museum	27/200	2. The Old Guitarist	View	
Museum of Fine Arts, Houston	145/200	Thirteen prints from the suite. [Object Numbers: 91.2024.1-13]	View All	
Philadelphia Museum of Art	88/200	12. A Picture of Ourselves	View	
Toledo Museum of Art	A.P. xxx/xxx*	13. The Poet; (Artist's Proof numbered 30/30 in Roman numerals *possibly a mistake by Hockney when numbering, that should read XXX/XXXV). [Object Number: 2017.26]	View	
Walker Art Center	A.P. VI/XXXV	Ten prints from the suite. [Accession Numbers: 1986.104.1-10]		

== Exhibitions ==
=== Dedicated exhibitions ===
==== 1979 ====
David Hockney: The Blue Guitar, The Museum of Modern Art, New York. (10 April — 3 July 1979).

=== Exhibitions including the complete suite ===
==== 1991 ====
Art for the Nation: Gifts in Honor of the 50th Anniversary of the National Gallery of Art, National Gallery of Art, Washington, D.C. (1991).

=== Exhibitions including prints from the suite ===
==== 1992 ====
Singular and Plural: Recent Accessions, Post-War Drawings and Prints, MFAH. (6 June — 8 August, 1992).

==== 1999 ====
De Picasso a Bacon: arte contemporáneo en las colecciones del Museo de Bellas Artes de Bilbao. (1999).

== Related artworks ==
Self Portrait with Blue Guitar (1977) oil on canvas by David Hockney

Model with Unfinished Self Portrait (1977) oil on canvas by David Hockney

=== Earlier sugar-lift aquatints ===
- The Student: Homage to Picasso (1973)
- Artist and Model (1973−74)
- Geography Book (Félicité's Only View from Abroad) (1974). Softground and hardground etching in red and blue on Arches wove paper. From the series Gustave Flaubert: A Simple Heart (1974), printed by Aldo Crommelynck in Paris with Hockney. Published in London by Petersburg Press.
- Contrejour in the French style (1974)
- Showing Maurice the Sugar Lift (1974). Hockney demonstrating the sugar lift aquatint technique to Maurice Payne.

=== Paintings ===
- Self Portrait with Blue Guitar (1977), oil on canvas, 60 x 72". Museum of Modern Art (Mumok), Ludwig Foundation, Vienna, Austria.
- Model with Unfinished Self Portrait (1977) oil on canvas, 60 x 60". Private Collection.

== Art market ==
=== Limited edition of 200 ===
==== 2022 ====
The complete boxed suite with title page, colophon and all with full margins, all signed and numbered 167/200 in pencil. Sold for £52,920 at Phillips in London on 13 September 2022, on an estimate of £30,000 – £50,000.

==== 2019 ====
The complete boxed suite with title page, colophon and all with full margins, all signed and numbered 187/200 in pencil. Sold for £37,500 at Sotheby's in London on 17 September 2019, on an estimate of £30,000 – £50,000.

==== 2012 ====
The complete boxed suite with title page, colophon and all with full margins, all signed and numbered 31/200 in pencil. Sold for £32,450 at Christie's in London on 17 February 2012, on an estimate of £12,000 – £16,000.

=== Proofs ===
==== 2011 ====
The complete suite of twenty etchings, all signed and numbered 'AP XII/XXXV' in pencil, an artist's proof aside from the edition of 200. Sold for £15,000 at Bonhams in London on 29 November 2011.

== Influence ==
'The History of art is a history of appropriations. Hockney has been able to adapt his reading of Picasso's art to his own very different representational problems and has thereby created works that are fresh, innovative, and personal.' — Gert Schiff, Professor of Art History, Critic

== See also ==
- Vollard Suite
- Fourteen Poems from C. P. Cavafy
- Six Fairy Tales from the Brothers Grimm
- A Rake's Progress
