= Of Modern Poetry =

Poem

"Of Modern Poetry" is included in Wallace Stevens' third volume of poetry, Parts of a World, published in 1942 and republished in 1951.

== Analyzing the poem ==
The poem is divided in two parts by a blank line, and each of the two parts contains a broken line, suggesting quasi-paragraphs. Thus the first division of the poem is five lines with the fourth line broken in two. The second division, the longer one, is lines six through twenty-six, with its quasi-paragraph break at line twenty-three. This typography is a partial clue to the poem's structure.

The poem begins and ends with non-sentences: "The poem of the mind in the act of finding / What will suffice." And "The poem of the act of the mind." Those are a subject and a recapitulation, but not a theme. By lacking a main verb, these lines avoid stating a theme. But more importantly they avoid tying the act of the mind to a time; the act of the mind is not past, present, or future. It is ongoing. These non-sentences also stress that the mind must act, not passively wait for inspiration or intuition. And the mind must seek to find "what will suffice." What that says of modern poetry will be addressed metaphorically in the poem, the organizing metaphor being that of a new stage on which the modern poet will perform.

The lines of the poem, non-traditional free verse, do not rhyme and are not metrical. They range from ten syllables to fourteen. One striking thing about the sounds of the poem is that three of the lines have weak endings; that is, the final words of these lines have unaccented syllables. The opening line quoted above has a weak ending--"The poem of the mind in the act of finding. . . ." This dissipation of rhetorical strength is carried further by the poet's not placing the repeated parallel phrases at the beginning of lines, a device called "anaphora", where they would be much stronger. For instance, immediately after the first break, traditional typography might have arranged the words like this:

It has to be living, to learn the speech of the place.
It has to face the men of the time
And to meet the women of the time.
It has to think about war
And it has to find what will suffice.
It has to construct a new stage.
It has to be on that stage . . . .

("It" refers to "the poem of the mind.")

Rearranging the words as they are above makes the rhetorical weakness of the original lines more apparent. "Think about war" and "find what will suffice" and the wordiness of the last two lines—all sap any energy the ideas might have had in the hands of a highly-rhetorical, non-modernist poet like Rudyard Kipling. But the ideas in those original lines need to be uttered by the speaker in order to move the poem forward. As pedestrian as these lines might be, they do get the job done; moreover, they introduce the shaping metaphor of the poem. The modern poem must not only "construct a new stage" but it must also find words that "will suffice" without merely repeating outmoded scripts and scenery, hand-me-down forms of expression and ideas. The modern poem must find what will suffice and "Make it new."

Following that, the words rise from the unemphatic rhetoric to the level of poetry. This passage runs from "Like an insatiable actor, slowly and . . ." (l. 11) through "Beyond which it has no will to rise" (l. 23). What does this "insatiable actor," this modern poem, do? It has to find what will satisfy human spiritual needs after replacing the past forms of expression and ideas, which have for modernists become mere "souvenirs." The reader has a choice of what "past" the poet is thinking of. It could be earlier forms of poetry, the didacticism of earlier poetry, the decline of communal values, particularly belief in Judeo-Christian religions, or something else. Perhaps the most satisfactory reading is to accept all these possibilities. This core passage describing the modern poem and its speaker ends with these lines:

The actor is

A metaphysician in the dark, twanging
An instrument, twanging a wiry string that gives
Sounds passing through sudden rightnesses, wholly
Containing the mind. . . .

(ll. 18-22)

In previous ages of belief, the speakers, whether priests or poets, expounded their metaphysics as if coming from a divine afflatus, a revelation, a spiritual light. Stevens' modern poem has to find not a revealed "message" but poems that satisfy a need that had been fulfilled by traditional poems.

For Stevens modern poetry lifted the poet and the reader out of the doldrums of daily life into a brilliant if temporary moment of intense life. For the reader to participate in this aesthetic experience, he or she needed to engage actively in making sense out of the poem. With a difficult and serious poet like Stevens, one way to do this is to find poems in the same book that "interinanimate the words" of the poem at hand. In this case, Section IV of "Variations on a Summer Day," published in Parts of a World (1942), provides this help for "Of Modern Poetry":

Words add to the senses. The words for the dazzle
Of mica, the dithering of grass,
The Arachne integument of dead trees,
Are the eye grown larger, more intense.

When the speaker says, "mica dazzles," the wording requires little verbal imagination of poet or reader. The personifying metaphor, "the dithering of grass," requires the reader to participate more actively in making sense of the words. And, finally, the unexpected phrase "the Arachne integument of dead trees" challenges and rewards the active reader. The image is one of Arachne herself weaving her webs around the dead trees. Surprising word choices and metaphoric images "add to the senses" and the reader's eye, the mind, does "grow larger, more intense." Offering such growth and intensity to the mind is an important way the modern poem finds what will suffice.

In addition to the striking word choices and metaphoric images, modern poetry offers unexpected sounds in place of traditional rhymes and meters. The modern poet, that "insatiable actor," stands on the new stage "twanging a wiry string that gives / Sounds passing through sudden rightnesses." He or she may be playing an unimpressive instrument, but, on the level of prosody, what is important is the "sudden rightnesses" of the sound of the words. The new music has "noble accents / And lucid, inescapable rhythms," that have never been heard before, as Stevens says in "Thirteen Ways of Looking at a Blackbird."

The modern poem "wholly contains the mind," not just fills it like meaning poured into a waiting vessel, but containing it. The new forms of finding what will suffice are created from the actor's dark metaphysics; the lucid, inescapable rhythms; and images growing out of ordinary things like "a man skating, a woman dancing, [or] a woman / Combing." The imagination that creates a modern poem gives its readers what will suffice through the sudden and intense pleasure of seeing the newly imagined in what is real.

== See also ==
- The Wallace Stevens Journal
