= Galerie Louise Leiris =

Coordinates: 48°52′40″N 2°18′39″E

Galerie Louise Leiris was a fine art gallery in Paris established by Daniel-Henry Kahnweiler in 1920.

Initially, the business was known as the Galerie Simon. It was named after Kahnweiler's partner, André Simon.

In 1940, the business was turned over to Louise Leiris, who was Kahnweiler's stepdaughter. It was run under her name.

Prominent among the artists who sold paintings through this gallery were Pablo Picasso, Henri Laurens, André Masson, Juan Gris, and Fernand Leger.

The gallery continued in business for several decades selling thousands of Picasso, Masson, and Dalí paintings in affordable at the time prices.
