= Wallace Stevens =

American poet (1879–1955)

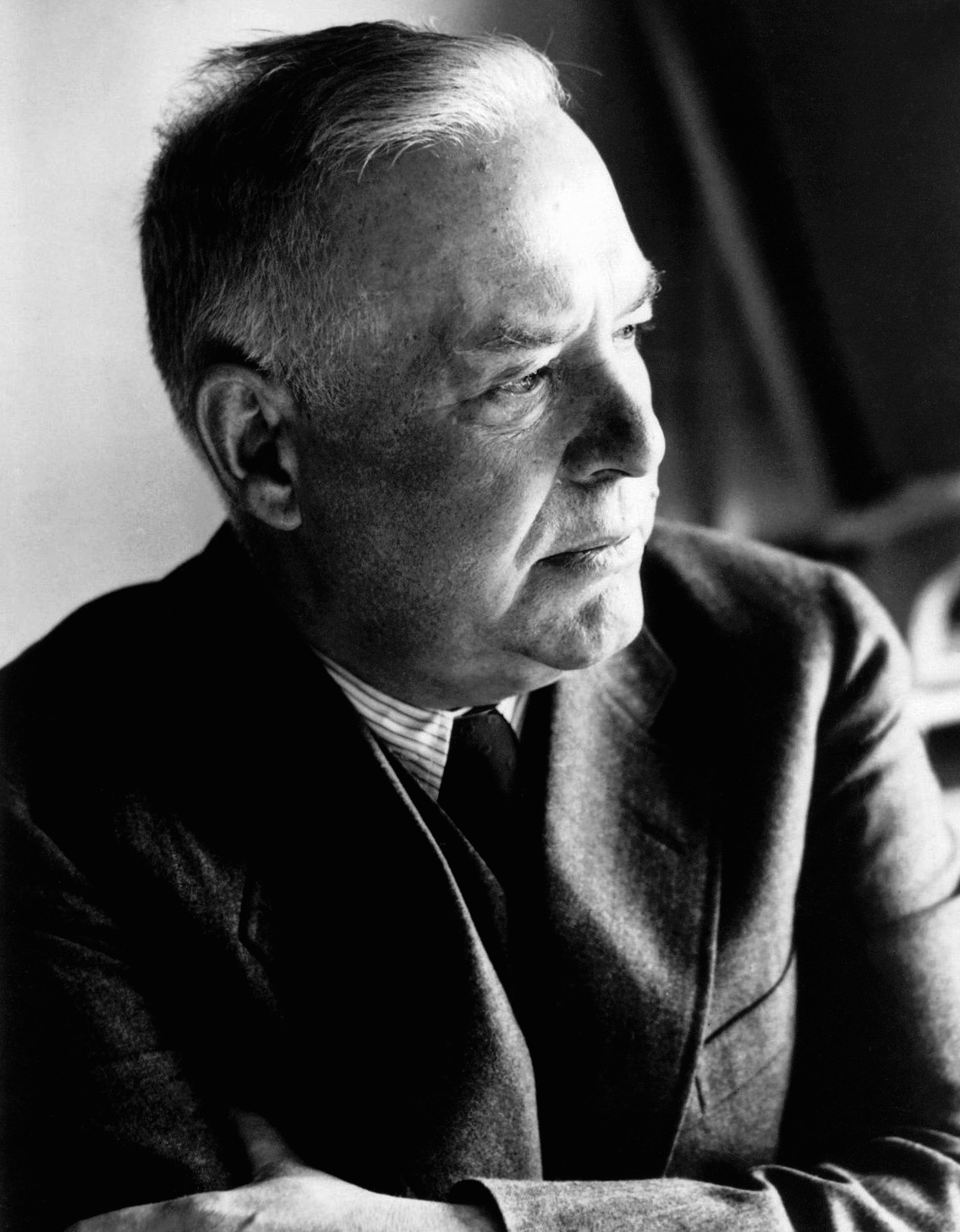
- Stevens in 1948
- Born: October 2, 1879; Reading, Pennsylvania, U.S.
- Died: August 2, 1955 (aged 75); Hartford, Connecticut, U.S.
- Education: Harvard University; New York Law School (LLB)
- Occupations: Poet; lawyer; insurance executive
- Spouse: Elsie Kachel (m. 1909)
- Children: 1
- Writing career
- Period: 1914–1955
- Notable works: Harmonium; The Idea of Order at Key West; The Man with the Blue Guitar; The Auroras of Autumn; Of Modern Poetry
- Notable awards: Robert Frost Medal (1951)
- Movement: Modernism

Wallace Stevens (October 2, 1879 – August 2, 1955) was an American modernist poet. He was born in Reading, Pennsylvania, educated at Harvard and then New York Law School, and spent most of his life working as an executive for an insurance company in Hartford, Connecticut.

Stevens's first period begins with the publication of Harmonium (1923), followed by a slightly revised and amended second edition in 1930. It features, among other poems, "The Emperor of Ice-Cream", "Sunday Morning", "The Snow Man", and "Thirteen Ways of Looking at a Blackbird". His second period commenced with Ideas of Order (1933), included in Transport to Summer (1947). His third and final period began with the publication of The Auroras of Autumn (1950), followed by The Necessary Angel: Essays On Reality and the Imagination (1951).

Many of Stevens's poems, like "Anecdote of the Jar", "The Man with the Blue Guitar", "The Idea of Order at Key West", "Of Modern Poetry", and "Notes Towards a Supreme Fiction", deal with the art of making art and poetry in particular. His Collected Poems (1954) won the Pulitzer Prize for Poetry in 1955.

== Life and career ==
=== Birth and early life ===
Stevens was born in Reading, Pennsylvania, in 1879 into a Lutheran family of Dutch and German descent. John Zeller, his maternal great-grandfather, settled in the Susquehanna Valley in 1709 as a religious refugee.

=== Education and marriage ===
The son of a prosperous lawyer, Stevens attended Harvard as a non-degree three-year special student from 1897 to 1900, where he served as the 1901 president of The Harvard Advocate. According to his biographer Milton Bates, Stevens was personally introduced to the philosopher George Santayana while living in Boston and was strongly influenced by Santayana's book Interpretations of Poetry and Religion. Holly Stevens, his daughter, recalled her father's long dedication to Santayana when she posthumously reprinted her father's collected letters in 1977 for Knopf. In one of his early journals, Stevens gave an account of spending an evening with Santayana in early 1900 and sympathizing with Santayana about a poor review published at that time of Interpretations. After his Harvard years, Stevens moved to New York City and briefly worked as a journalist. He then attended New York Law School, graduating with a law degree in 1903, following the example of his two other brothers with law degrees.

On a trip back to Reading in 1904, Stevens met Elsie Viola Kachel (1886–1963, also known as Elsie Moll), a young woman who had worked as a saleswoman, milliner, and stenographer. After a long courtship, they married in 1909 over the objections of his parents, who considered her poorly educated and lower-class. As The New York Times reported in 2009, "Nobody from his family attended the wedding, and Stevens never again visited or spoke to his parents during his father's lifetime." A daughter, Holly, was born in 1924. She was baptized Episcopalian and later posthumously edited her father's letters and a collection of his poems.

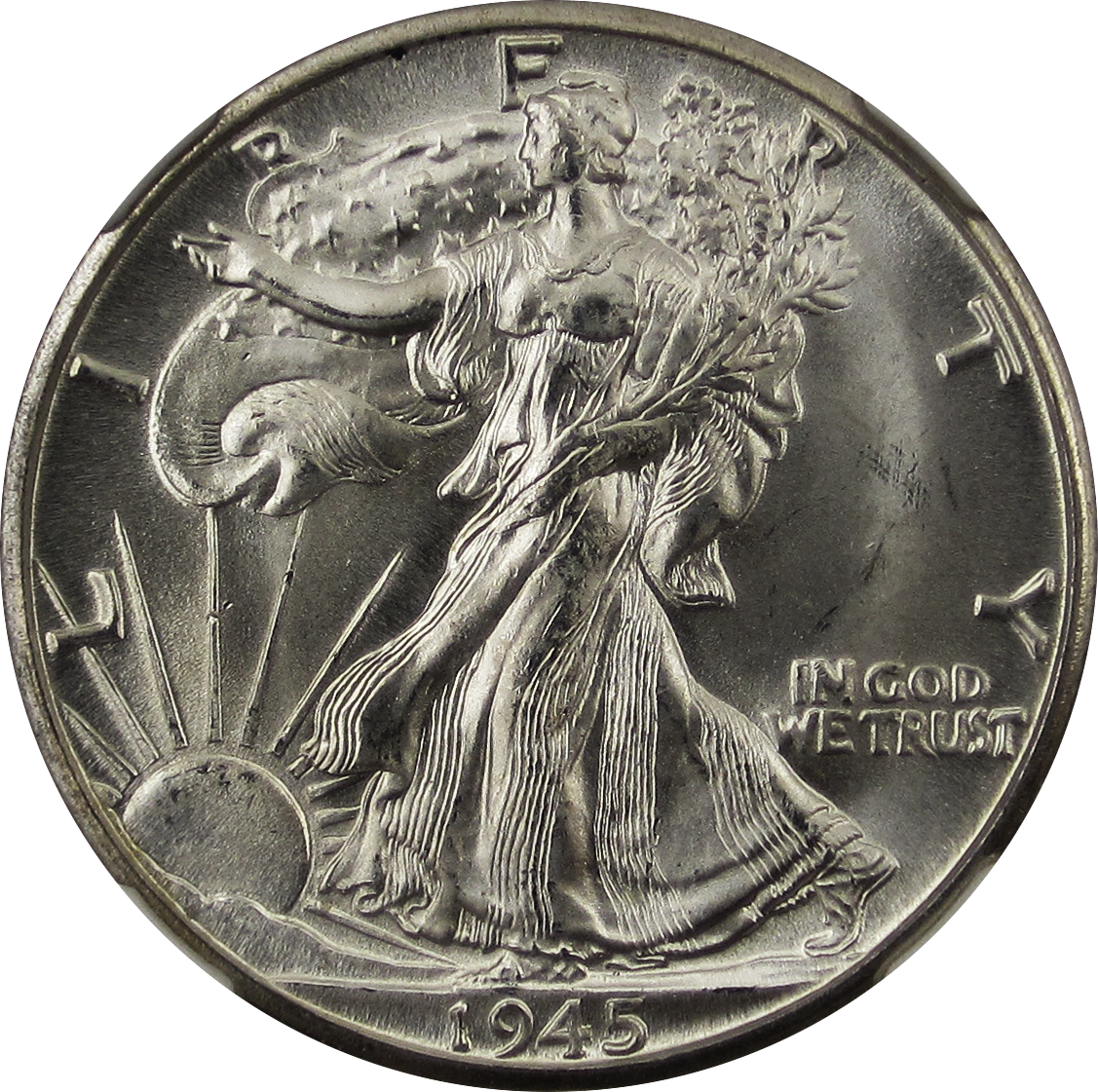
Stevens's wife, Elsie, may have been a model for the national Walking Liberty half dollar when the couple lived in New York City

In 1913, the Stevenses rented a New York City apartment from sculptor Adolph A. Weinman, who made a bust of Elsie. Her striking profile may have been used on Weinman's 1916–1945 Mercury dime and the Walking Liberty Half Dollar. In later years, Elsie Stevens began to exhibit symptoms of mental illness and the marriage suffered as a result, but the couple remained married. In his biography of Stevens, Paul Mariani relates that the couple was largely estranged, separated by nearly a full decade in age, though living in the same home. By the mid-1930s, Mariani writes: "there were signs of domestic fracture to consider. From the beginning, Stevens, who had not shared a bedroom with his wife for years now, moved into the master bedroom with its attached study on the second floor."

=== Career ===
After working in several New York law firms between 1904 and 1907, Stevens was hired in January 1908 as a lawyer for the American Bonding Company. By 1914 he had become vice president of the New York office of the Equitable Surety Company of St. Louis, Missouri. When this job was made redundant after a merger in 1916, he joined the home office of Hartford Accident and Indemnity Company and moved to Hartford, where he remained for the rest of his life.

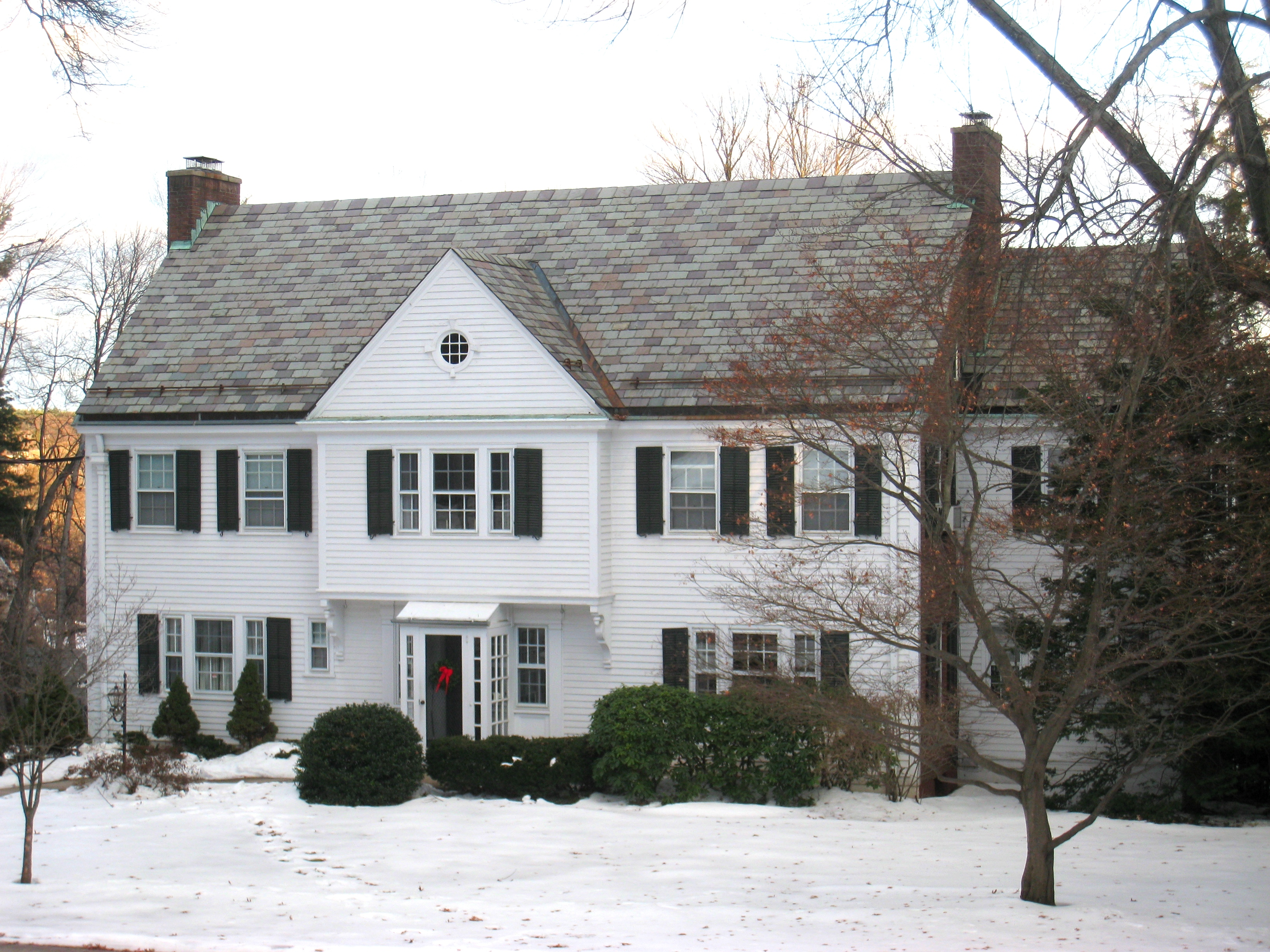
Stevens's Hartford residence.

Stevens's career as a businessman-lawyer by day and a poet during his leisure time has received significant attention, as summarized in Thomas C. Grey's The Wallace Stevens Case. Grey has summarized parts of the responsibilities of Stevens's day-to-day life that involved the evaluation of surety insurance claims as follows: "If Stevens rejected a claim and the company was sued, he would hire a local lawyer to defend the case in the place where it would be tried. Stevens would instruct the outside lawyer through a letter reviewing the facts of the case and setting out the company's substantive legal position; he would then step out of the case, delegating all decisions on procedure and litigation strategy."

In 1917 Stevens and his wife moved to 210 Farmington Avenue, where they remained for the next seven years and where he completed his first book of poems, Harmonium. From 1924 to 1932 he resided at 735 Farmington Avenue. In 1932 he purchased a 1920s Colonial at 118 Westerly Terrace, where he resided for the remainder of his life. According to Mariani, Stevens was financially independent as an insurance executive by the mid-1930s, earning "$20,000 a year, equivalent to about $350,000 today [2016]. And this at a time (during The Great Depression) when many Americans were out of work, searching through trash cans for food." Harriet Monroe, reviewing Harmonium for Poetry, wrote: "The delight which one breathes like a perfume from the poetry of Wallace Stevens is the natural effluence of his own clear and untroubled and humorously philosophical delight in the beauty of things as they are."

By 1934, Stevens had been named vice president of the company. After he won the Pulitzer Prize in 1955, he was offered a faculty position at Harvard but declined since it would have required him to give up his job at The Hartford.

Throughout his life, Stevens was politically conservative. The critic William York Tindall described him as a Republican in the mold of Robert A. Taft.

=== Travel ===
Stevens made numerous visits to Key West, Florida, between 1922 and 1940, usually staying at the Casa Marina hotel on the Atlantic Ocean. He first visited in January 1922, while on a business trip. "The place is a paradise," he wrote to Elsie, "midsummer weather, the sky brilliantly clear and intensely blue, the sea blue and green beyond what you have ever seen." Key West's influence on Stevens's poetry is evident in many of the poems published in his first two collections, Harmonium and Ideas of Order. In February 1935, Stevens encountered the poet Robert Frost at the Casa Marina. The two men argued, and Frost reported that Stevens had been drunk and acted inappropriately. According to Mariani, Stevens often visited speakeasies during Prohibition with both lawyer friends and poetry acquaintances.

The following year, Stevens was in an altercation with Ernest Hemingway at a party at the Waddell Avenue home of a mutual acquaintance in Key West. Stevens broke his hand, apparently from hitting Hemingway's jaw, and was repeatedly knocked to the street by Hemingway. Stevens later apologized. Mariani relates this:

directly in front of Stevens was the very nemesis of his Imagination—the antipoet poet (Hemingway), the poet of extraordinary reality, as Stevens would later call him, which put him in the same category as that other antipoet, William Carlos Williams, except that Hemingway was fifteen years younger and much faster than Williams, and far less friendly. So it began, with Stevens swinging at the bespectacled Hemingway, who seemed to weave like a shark, and Papa hitting him one-two and Stevens going down "spectacularly," as Hemingway would remember it, into a puddle of fresh rainwater.

In 1940, Stevens made his final trip to Key West. Frost was at the Casa Marina again, and again the two men argued. According to Mariani, the exchange in Key West in February 1940 included the following comments:

Stevens: Your poems are too academic.

Frost: Your poems are too executive.

Stevens: The trouble with you Robert, is that you write about subjects.

Frost: The trouble with you, Wallace, is that you write about bric-a-brac.

=== Post-war poetry ===
By late February 1947, with Stevens approaching 67 years of age, it became apparent that he had completed the most productive ten years of his life in writing poetry. February 1947 saw the publication of his volume of poems Transport to Summer, which was positively received by F. O. Mathiessen in The New York Times. In the 11 years immediately preceding its publication, Stevens had written four volumes of poems: Ideas of Order, The Man with the Blue Guitar, Parts of a World, and Transport to Summer. These were all written before Stevens took up the writing of his well-received The Auroras of Autumn.

In 1950–51, when Stevens received news that Santayana had retired to live at a retirement institution in Rome for his final years, Stevens composed his poem "To an Old Philosopher in Rome":

It is a kind of total grandeur at the end,
With every visible thing enlarged and yet
No more than a bed, a chair and moving nuns,
The immensest theatre, the pillowed porch,
The book and candle in your ambered room.

=== Last illness and death ===
According to Mariani, Stevens had a large, corpulent figure throughout most of his life, standing 6 feet 2 inches (1.88 m) tall and weighing as much as 240 pounds (110 kg). Some of his doctors put him on medical diets. On March 28, 1955, Stevens went to see Dr. James Moher for accumulating detriments to his health. Moher's examination did not reveal anything, and he ordered Stevens to undergo an x-ray and barium enema on April 1, neither of which showed anything. On April 19 Stevens underwent a G.I. series that revealed diverticulitis, a gallstone, and a severely bloated stomach. Stevens was admitted to St. Francis Hospital and on April 26 was operated on by Dr. Benedict Landry.

It was determined that Stevens was suffering from stomach cancer in the lower region by the large intestines and blocking the normal digestion of food. Lower tract oncology of a malignant nature was almost always a mortal diagnosis in the 1950s. This was withheld from Stevens, but his daughter Holly was fully informed and advised not to tell her father. Stevens was released in a temporarily improved ambulatory condition on May 11 and returned to his home to recuperate. His wife insisted on trying to attend to him as he recovered but she had suffered a stroke in the previous winter and was not able to assist as she had hoped. Stevens entered the Avery Convalescent Hospital on May 20.

By early June he was still sufficiently stable to attend a ceremony at the University of Hartford to receive an honorary Doctor of Humanities degree. On June 13 he traveled to New Haven to collect an honorary Doctor of Letters degree from Yale University. On June 20 he returned to his home and insisted on working for limited hours. On July 21 Stevens was readmitted to St. Francis Hospital and his condition deteriorated. On August 1, though bedridden, he revived sufficiently to speak some parting words to his daughter before falling asleep after normal visiting hours were over; he was found deceased the next morning, August 2, at 8:30.

Mariani indicates that friends of Stevens were aware that throughout his years and many visits to New York City, Stevens was in the habit of visiting St Patrick's Cathedral for meditative purposes. Stevens debated questions of theodicy during his final weeks with Fr. Arthur Hanley, chaplain of St. Francis Hospital in Hartford, where Stevens spent his last days suffering from stomach cancer and was eventually converted to Catholicism in April 1955 by Hanley. This purported deathbed conversion is disputed, particularly by Stevens's daughter, Holly, who was not present at the time of the conversion, according to Hanley. The conversion has been confirmed by both Hanley and a nun present at the time of the conversion and communion. He had a long correspondence with Catholic nun, literary critic and poet M. Bernetta Quinn, whose work he loved and with whom he was close. Stevens's obituary in the local newspaper was minimal at the family's request as to the details of his death. The obituary for Stevens that appeared in Poetry magazine was assigned to William Carlos Williams, who felt it suitable to compare Stevens's poetry to Dante's Vita Nuova and Milton's Paradise Lost. At the end of his life, Stevens had left uncompleted his larger ambition to rewrite Dante's Divine Comedy for those who "live in the world of Darwin and not the world of Plato."

== Reception ==
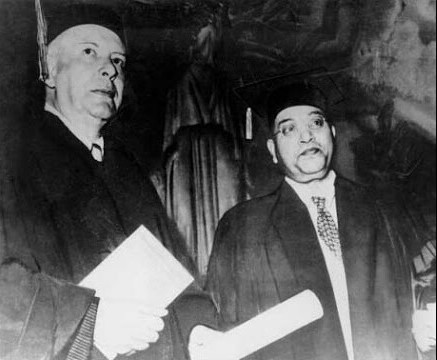
Stevens with B. R. Ambedkar, the father of the Indian Constitution, at Columbia University on June 5, 1952

=== Early 20th century ===
The initial reception of Stevens's poetry followed the publication of his first collection of poems, Harmonium, in the early 1920s. Comments on the poems were made by fellow poets and a small number of critics including William Carlos Williams and Hi Simons. In her book on Stevens's poetry, Helen Vendler writes that much of the early reception of his poems was oriented to symbolic reading of them, often using simple substitution of metaphors and imagery for their asserted equivalents in meaning. For Vendler, this method of reception and interpretation was often limited in its usefulness and would eventually be replaced by more effective forms of literary evaluation and review.

=== Late 20th century ===
After Stevens's death in 1955, the literary interpretation of his poetry and critical essays began to flourish with full-length books written about his poems by such prominent literary scholars as Vendler and Harold Bloom. Vendler's two books on Stevens's poetry distinguished his short poems and his long poems and suggested that they be considered under separate forms of literary interpretation and critique. Her studies of the longer poems are in her book On Extended Wings and lists Stevens's longer poems as including "The Comedian as the Letter C", "Sunday Morning", "Le Monocle de Mon Oncle", "Like Decorations in a Nigger Cemetery", "Owl's Clover", "The Man with the Blue Guitar", "Examination of the Hero in a Time of War", "Notes Toward a Supreme Fiction", "Esthetique du Mal", "Description without Place", "Credences of Summer", "The Auroras of Autumn", and his last and longest poem, "An Ordinary Evening in New Haven". Another full-length study of Stevens's poetry in the late 20th century is Daniel Fuchs's The Comic Spirit of Wallace Stevens.

=== Early 21st century ===
Interest in the reading and reception of Stevens's poetry continues into the early 21st century, with a full volume dedicated in the Library of America to his collected writings and poetry. In his book on the reading of Stevens as a poet of what he calls "philosophical poetry", Charles Altieri presents his own reading of such philosophers as Hegel and Wittgenstein while presenting a speculative interpretation of Stevens under this approach. In his 2016 book Things Merely Are: Philosophy in the Poetry of Wallace Stevens, Simon Critchley indicates a refinement of the appreciation of the interaction of reality and poetry in Stevens's poems, writing: "Steven's late poems stubbornly show how the mind cannot seize hold of the ultimate nature of reality that faces it. Reality retreats before the imagination that shapes and orders it. Poetry is therefore the experience of failure. As Stevens puts it in a famous late poem, the poet gives us ideas about the thing, not the thing itself."

== Interpretation ==
The reception and interpretation of Stevens's poetry have been widespread and of diverse orientation. In their book The Fluent Mundo Leonard and Wharton define at least four schools of interpretation, beginning with the prime advocates of Stevens found in the critics Harvey Pearce and Helen Regueiro, who supported the thesis "that Stevens's later poetry denies the value of imagination for the sake of an unobstructed view of the 'things themselves'". The next school of interpretation Leonard and Wharton identify is the Romantic school, led by Vendler, Bloom, James Baird, and Joseph Riddel. A third school of Stevens interpretation that sees Stevens as heavily dependent on 20th-century Continental philosophy includes J. Hillis Miller, Thomas J. Hines, and Richard Macksey. A fourth school sees Stevens as fully Husserlian or Heideggerian in approach and tone and is led by Hines, Macksey, Simon Critchley, Glauco Cambon, and Paul Bove. These four schools offer occasional agreement and disagreement of perspective; for example, Critchley reads Bloom's interpretation of Stevens as in the anti-realist school while seeing Stevens as not in the anti-realist school of poetic interpretation.

=== Maturity of poetry ===
Stevens is a rare example of a poet whose main output came largely only as he approached 40 years of age. His first major publication (four poems from a sequence titled "Phases" in the November 1914 edition of Poetry) was written at age 35, although as an undergraduate at Harvard, Stevens had written poetry and exchanged sonnets with Santayana. Many of his canonical works were written well after he turned 50. According to Bloom, who called Stevens the "best and most representative" American poet of the time, no Western writer since Sophocles has had such a late flowering of artistic genius. His contemporary Harriet Monroe called Stevens "a poet, rich and numerous and profound, provocative of joy, creative beauty in those who can respond to him". Vendler notes that there are three distinguishable moods present in Stevens's long poems: ecstasy, apathy, and reluctance between ecstasy and apathy. She also notes that his poetry was highly influenced by the paintings of Paul Klee and Paul Cézanne:

Stevens saw in the paintings of both Paul Klee—who was his favorite painter—and Cézanne the kind of work he wanted to do himself as a Modernist poet. Klee had imagined symbols. Klee is not a directly realistic painter and is full of whimsical and fanciful and imaginative and humorous projections of reality in his paintings. The paintings are often enigmatic or full of riddles, and Stevens liked that as well. What Stevens liked in Cézanne was the reduction, you might say, of the world to a few monumental objects.

Stevens's first book of poetry, Harmonium, was published in 1923, and republished in a second edition in 1930. Two more books of his poetry were produced during the 1920s and 1930s and three more in the 1940s. He received the annual National Book Award for Poetry twice, in 1951 for The Auroras of Autumn and in 1955 for Collected Poems.

=== Imagination and reality ===
For Thomas Grey, a Stevens biographer specializing in attention to Stevens as a businessman lawyer, Stevens in part related his poetry to his imaginative capacities as a poet while assigning his lawyer's duties more to the reality of making ends meet in his personal life. Grey finds the poem "A Rabbit as King of the Ghosts" useful to understanding the approach Stevens took in separating his poetry and his profession, writing: "The law and its prose were separate from poetry, and supplied a form of relief for Stevens by way of contrast with poetry, as the milkman (portrayed as the realist in the poem) relieves from the moonlight, as the walk around the block relieves the writer's trance like absorption. But the priority was clear: imagination, poetry, and secrecy, pursued after hours were primary, good in themselves; reason, prose, and clarity, indulged in during working hours, were secondary and instrumental".

In the Southern Review, Hi Simons wrote that much of early Stevens is juvenile romantic subjectivist, before he became a realist and naturalist in his more mature and more widely recognized idiom of later years. Stevens, whose work became meditative and philosophical, became very much a poet of ideas. "The poem must resist the intelligence / Almost successfully", he wrote. Of the relation between consciousness and the world, in Stevens's work "imagination" is not equivalent to consciousness, nor is "reality" equivalent to the world as it exists outside our minds. Reality is the product of the imagination as it shapes the world. Because it is constantly changing as we attempt to find imaginatively satisfying ways to perceive the world; reality is an activity, not a static object. We approach reality with a piecemeal understanding, putting together parts of the world in an attempt to make it seem coherent. To make sense of the world is to construct a worldview through an active exercise of the imagination. This is no dry, philosophical activity, but a passionate engagement in finding order and meaning. Thus Stevens wrote in "The Idea of Order at Key West":

Oh! Blessed rage for order, pale Ramon,
The maker's rage to order words of the sea,
Words of the fragrant portals, dimly-starred,
And of ourselves and of our origins,
In ghostlier demarcations, keener sounds.

In Opus Posthumous, Stevens writes, "After one has abandoned a belief in God, poetry is that essence which takes its place as life's redemption." But as the poet attempts to find a fiction to replace the lost gods, he immediately encounters a problem: a direct knowledge of reality is not possible.

Stevens suggests that we live in the tension between the shapes we take as the world acts upon us and the ideas of order that our imagination imposes upon the world. The world influences us in our most normal activities: "The dress of a woman of Lhassa, / In its place, / Is an invisible element of that place / Made visible." As Stevens says in his essay "Imagination as Value", "The truth seems to be that we live in concepts of the imagination before the reason has established them."

=== Supreme Fiction ===
Notes Toward a Supreme Fiction is a lyrical poetic work of three parts, containing 10 poems each, with a preface and epilogue opening and closing the entire work of three parts. It was first published in 1942 and represents a comprehensive attempt by Stevens to state his view of the art of writing poetry. Stevens studied the art of poetic expression in many of his writings and poems, including The Necessary Angel, where he wrote, "The imagination loses vitality as it ceases to adhere to what is real. When it adheres to the unreal and intensifies what is unreal, while its first effect may be extraordinary, that effect is the maximum effect that it will ever have."

Throughout his poetic career, Stevens was concerned with the question of what to think about the world now that notions of religion no longer suffice. His solution might be summarized by the notion of a "Supreme Fiction", an idea that would serve to correct and improve old notions of religion along with old notions of the idea of God of which Stevens was critical. In this example from the satirical "A High-Toned Old Christian Woman", Stevens plays with the notions of immediately accessible, but ultimately unsatisfying, notions of reality:

Poetry is the supreme Fiction, madame.
Take the moral law and make a nave of it
And from the nave build haunted heaven. Thus,
The conscience is converted into palms
Like windy citherns, hankering for hymns.
We agree in principle. That's clear. But take
The opposing law and make a peristyle,
And from the peristyle project a masque
Beyond the planets. Thus, our bawdiness,
Unpurged by epitaph, indulged at last,
Is equally converted into palms,
Squiggling like saxophones. And palm for palm,
Madame, we are where we began.

The saxophones squiggle because, as J. Hillis Miller says of Stevens in his book Poets of Reality, the theme of universal fluctuation is a constant theme throughout Stevens's poetry: "A great many of Stevens's poems show an object or group of objects in aimless oscillation or circling movement." In the end, reality remains.

The supreme fiction is that conceptualization of reality that seems to resonate in its rightness, so much so that it seems to have captured, if only for a moment, something actual and real.

I am the angel of reality,
seen for a moment standing in the door.

Yet I am the necessary angel of earth,
Since, in my sight, you see the earth again,

Cleared of its stiff and stubborn, man-locked set,
And, in my hearing, you hear its tragic drone

Rise liquidly in liquid lingerings,
Like watery words awash;

A figure half seen, or seen for a moment, a man
Of the mind, an apparition appareled in

Apparels of such lightest look that a turn
Of my shoulder and quickly, too quickly, I am gone?

In one of his last poems, "Final Soliloquy of the Interior Paramour", Stevens describes the experience of an idea that satisfies the imagination and writes, "The world imagined is the ultimate good." Stevens places this thought in the individual human mind and writes of its compatibility with his own poetic interpretation of God, writing: "Within its vital boundary, in the mind,/ We say God and the imagination are one …/ How high that highest candle lights the dark."

=== Poetic criticism of old religion ===
Imaginative knowledge of the type described in "Final Soliloquy" necessarily exists within the mind, since it is an aspect of the imagination that can never attain a direct experience of reality.

We say God and the imagination are one…
How high that highest candle lights the dark.

Out of this same light, out of the central mind
We make a dwelling in the evening air,
In which being there together is enough.

Stevens concludes that God and human imagination are closely identified, but that feeling of rightness which for so long a time existed with that old religious idea of God may be accessed again. This supreme fiction will be something equally central to our being, but contemporary to our lives, in a way that the old religious idea of God can never again be. But with the right idea, we may again find the same sort of solace that we once found in old religious ideas. "[Stevens] finds, too, a definite value in the complete contact with reality. Only, in fact, by this stark knowledge can he attain his own spiritual self that can resist the disintegrating forces of life … Powerful force though the mind is … it cannot find the absolutes. Heaven lies about the seeing man in his sensuous apprehension of the world …; everything about him is part of the truth."

… Poetry
Exceeding music must take the place
Of empty heaven and its hymns,
Ourselves in poetry must take their place

In this way, Stevens's poems adopt attitudes that are corollaries to those earlier spiritual longings that persist in the unconscious currents of the imagination. "The poem refreshes life so that we share, / For a moment, the first idea … It satisfies / Belief in an immaculate beginning / And sends us, winged by an unconscious will, / To an immaculate end." The "first idea" is that essential reality that stands before all others, that essential truth; but since all knowledge is contingent on its time and place, that supreme fiction will surely be transitory. This is the necessary angel of subjective reality—a reality that must always be qualified—and as such, always misses the mark to some degree—always contains elements of unreality.

Miller summarizes Stevens's position:

Though this dissolving of the self is in one way the end of everything, in another way it is the happy liberation. There are only two entities left now that the gods are dead: man and nature, subject and object. Nature is the physical world, visible, audible, tangible, present to all the senses, and man is consciousness, the nothing which receives nature and transforms it into something unreal…

=== Influence of Nietzsche ===
Aspects of Stevens's thought and poetry draw from the writings of Friedrich Nietzsche. Stevens's poem "Description without Place", for example, directly mentions the philosopher:

Nietzsche in Basel studied the deep pool
Of these discolorations, mastering
The moving and the moving of their forms
In the much-mottled motion of blank time.

Scholars have attempted to trace some of Nietzsche's influence on Stevens's thought. While Stevens's intellectual relationship to Nietzsche's is complex, it is clear that he shared Nietzsche's perspective on topics such as religion, change, and the individual. Milton J. Bates writes:

in a 1948 letter to Rodriguez Feo, [Stevens] expressed his autumnal mood with an allusion to Nietzsche: "How this oozing away hurts notwithstanding the pumpkins and the glaciale of frost and the onslaught of books and pictures and music and people. It is finished, Zarathustra says; and one goes to the Canoe Club and has a couple of Martinis and a pork chop and looks down the spaces of the river and participates in the disintegration, the decomposition, the rapt finale" (L 621). Whatever Nietzsche would have thought of the Canoe Club and its cuisine, he would have appreciated the rest of the letter, which excoriates a world in which the weak affect to be strong and the strong keep silence, in which group living has all but eliminated men of character.

=== Literary influence ===
From the first, critics and fellow poets praised Stevens. Hart Crane wrote to a friend in 1919, after reading some of the poems that would make up Harmonium, "There is a man whose work makes most of the rest of us quail." The Poetry Foundation states that "by the early 1950s Stevens was regarded as one of America's greatest contemporary poets, an artist whose precise abstractions exerted substantial influence on other writers." Some critics, like Randall Jarrell and Yvor Winters, praised Stevens's early work but were critical of his more abstract and philosophical later poems.

Harold Bloom, Helen Vendler, and Frank Kermode are among the critics who have cemented Stevens's position in the canon as one of the key figures of 20th-century American Modernist poetry. Bloom has called Stevens "a vital part of the American mythology" and unlike Winters and Jarrell, Bloom has cited Stevens's later poems, like "Poems of our Climate," as among his best.

In commenting on the place of Stevens among contemporary poets and previous poets, his biographer Paul Mariani stated, "Stevens's real circle of philosopher-poets included Pound and Eliot as well as Milton and the great romantics. By extension, E. E. Cummings was a mere shadow of a poet, while Blackmur (a contemporary critic and publisher) did not even deign to mention Williams, Moore, or Hart Crane."

=== Racism ===
There is various evidence of Stevens's contempt for people of African descent, e.g., his use of the phrase "nigger mystics" in his poem "Prelude to Objects", and the title of his poem "Like Decorations in a Nigger Cemetery". This attitude is further illustrated by the following anecdote: "It happened during the meeting of the National Book Award committee that gave the poetry prize to Marianne Moore. [F]ive [judges, including] Wallace Stevens … passed the time looking at photographs of previous meetings of National Book Award judges. Gwendolyn Brooks appeared in one of these. On seeing the photo, Stevens remarked, 'Who's the coon?' … Noticing the reaction of the group to his question, he asked, 'I know you don't like to hear people call a lady a coon, but who is it?'”

== In popular culture ==
In 1976, after discovering Picasso's etching techniques from Atelier Crommelynck, David Hockney produced a suite of 20 etchings called The Blue Guitar. The frontispiece mentions Hockney's dual inspiration as "The Blue Guitar: Etchings By David Hockney Who Was Inspired By Wallace Stevens Who Was Inspired By Pablo Picasso". The etchings refer to themes of a poem by Stevens, The Man with the Blue Guitar. Petersburg Press published the portfolio in October 1977. The same year, Petersburg also published a book in which the poem's text accompanied the images.

Both titles of an early story by John Crowley, first published in 1978 as "Where Spirits Gat Them Home", later collected in 1993 as "Her Bounty to the Dead", come from "Sunday Morning". The titles of two novels by D. E. Tingle, Imperishable Bliss (2009) and A Chant of Paradise (2014), come from "Sunday Morning". John Irving quotes Stevens's poem "The Plot Against the Giant" in his novel The Hotel New Hampshire. In Terrence Malick's 1973 film Badlands, the nicknames of the protagonists are Red and Kit, a possible reference to Stevens's poem "Red Loves Kit".

Vic Chesnutt recorded a song named "Wallace Stevens" on his 2007 album North Star Deserter. The song references Stevens' poem "Thirteen Ways of Looking at a Blackbird".

Nick Cave cited the lines "And the waves, the waves were soldiers moving" in his song "We Call Upon the Author" (from the 2008 album Dig, Lazarus, Dig!!!). They come from Stevens' poem "Dry Loaf".

Laird Barron used the line "And I remembered the cry of the peacocks" from Stevens's poem "Domination of Black" and the line "Imago, Imago, Imago" from Stevens's poem "Imago" as epigraphs in two of his short stories.

Stevens was honored with a US postage stamp in 2012.

== Awards ==
During his lifetime, Stevens received numerous awards in recognition of his work, including:

- Bollingen Prize for Poetry (1949)
- National Book Award for Poetry (1951, 1955) for The Auroras of Autumn, The Collected Poems of Wallace Stevens
- Frost Medal (1951)
- Pulitzer Prize for Poetry (1955) for Collected Poems

== Bibliography ==
=== Poetry ===
- Harmonium (1923) Harmonium public domain audiobook at LibriVox
- Ideas of Order (1936)
- Owl's Clover (1936)
- The Man with the Blue Guitar (1937)
- Parts of a World (1942)
- Transport to Summer (1947)
- The Auroras of Autumn (1950)
- The Collected Poems of Wallace Stevens, New York: Vintage Books, 1954.

Posthumous collections

- Opus Posthumous (1957)
- The Palm at the End of the Mind (1972)
- Collected Poetry and Prose (New York: The Library of America, 1997)
- Selected Poems (John N. Serio, ed.) (New York: Alfred A. Knopf, 2009)

=== Prose ===
- The Necessary Angel (essays) (1951)

Posthumous publications

- Letters of Wallace James Stevens, edited by Holly Stevens (1966)
- Secretaries of the Moon: The Letters of Wallace Stevens & Jose Rodriguez Feo, edited by Beverly Coyle and Alan Filreis (1986)
- Sur plusieurs beaux sujects: Wallace Stevens's Commonplace Book, edited by Milton J. Bates (1989)
- The Contemplated Spouse: The Letters of Wallace Stevens to Elsie Kachel, edited by D.J. Blount (2006)

=== Plays ===
- Three Travelers Watch a Sunrise (1916)

== See also ==
- The Bird with the Coppery, Keen Claws
- Modernist literature
