= The Man with the Blue Guitar =

Poem by Wallace Stevens

The Man With the Blue Guitar is a poem published in 1937 by Wallace Stevens. It is divided into thirty-three brief sections, or cantos.

== Background ==
The poem has been discussed as taking the form of an imaginary conversation with the subject of Pablo Picasso's 1903-04 painting The Old Guitarist, which Stevens may have viewed when it was exhibited at the Wadsworth Atheneum in Hartford, Connecticut, in 1934. But Stevens insisted this influence was only peripheral. In a letter dated July 1, 1953, to Professor Renato Poggioli, who had recently translated his poem into Italian, Stevens wrote: "I had no particular painting of Picasso's in mind and even though it might help to sell the book to have one of his paintings on the cover, I don't think we ought to reproduce anything of Picasso's."

Paul Mariani, a biographer of Stevens, presented a counterpoint to these objections raised by Stevens concerning the origin of this poem stating, "Despite his repeatedly denying it, Stevens does seem to have a particular painting in mind here: Picasso's 1903 The Old Guitarist, which portrays an old man with white hair and beard sitting distorted and cross-legged as he plays his guitar. If Picasso attempted to portray the world of poverty and abject misery, it was because that had been his own plight as a struggling young artist in Barcelona, where he painted many pictures including this one, of the poor. The painting is almost entirely done in monochromatic blues and blue-blacks, except for the guitar itself, which is painted in a slightly warmer brown. The man is blind but, no longer seeing the world around him, he sees more deeply into the reality within."

In the poem, an unnamed "they" says, of the titular man, "you do not play things as they are", sparking a prolonged meditation on the nature of art, performance, and imagination.

Stevens began writing the poem in December 1936, not long after his completion of the poetry collection Owl's Clover in the spring of that year. The Man With the Blue Guitar became one of his most successful long poems, and William Carlos Williams wrote at the time that he considered it one of Stevens's best works.

== In popular culture ==
Michael Tippett based his guitar sonata, The Blue Guitar (1984), on selected stanzas: 19, 30, and 31, from the poem, and John Banville's 2015 novel The Blue Guitar draws its title and epigraph from the poem.

Dean Koontz uses lines from the poem as a password in his 2017 book The Silent Corner.

David Hockney created a suite of twenty etchings entitled The Blue Guitar (1976–1977). The frontispiece mentions Hockney's dual inspiration as "The Blue Guitar, Etchings by David Hockney who was inspired by Wallace Stevens who was inspired by Pablo Picasso".
