= Horses in art =

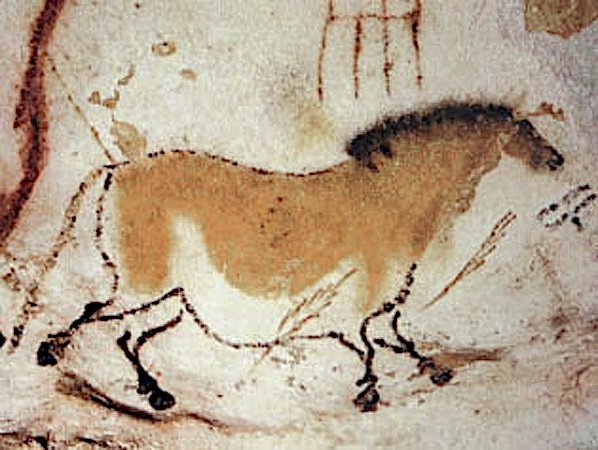
Lascaux, Horse, c. Stone Age cave painting

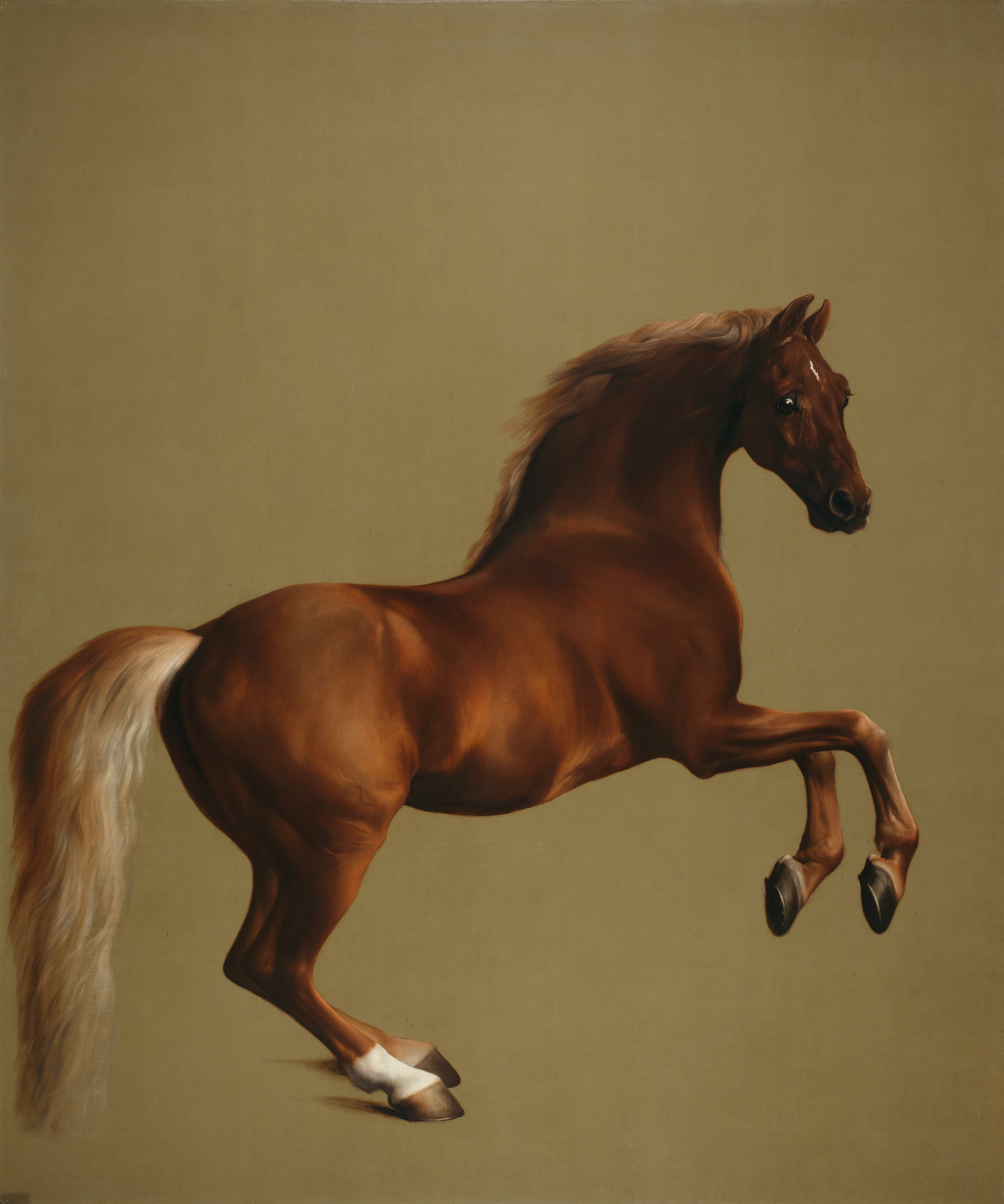
George Stubbs, Whistlejacket, c. 1762, National Gallery, London.

Horses have appeared in works of art throughout history, frequently as depictions of the horse in battle. The horse appears less frequently in modern art, partly because the horse is no longer significant either as a mode of transportation or as an implement of war. Most modern representations are of famous contemporary horses, artwork associated with horse racing, or artwork associated with the historic cowboy or Native American tradition of the American West. In the United Kingdom, depictions of fox hunting and nostalgic rural scenes involving horses continue to be made.

Horses often appear in artworks singly, as a mount for an important person, or in teams, hitched to a variety of horse-drawn vehicles.

== History ==
=== Prehistory ===
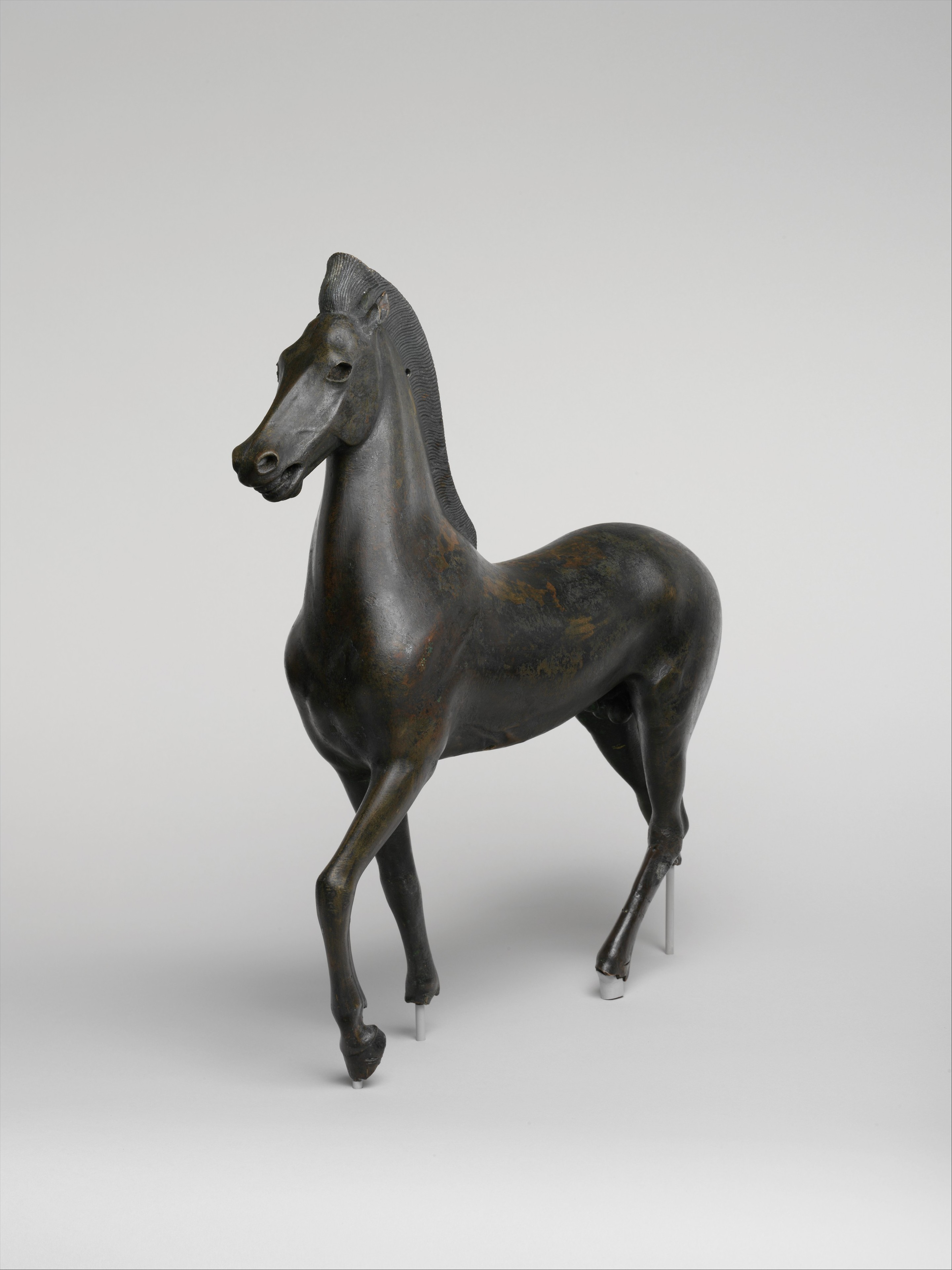
Bronze Statuette of a Horse, late 2nd – 1st century B.C. Metropolitan Museum of Art

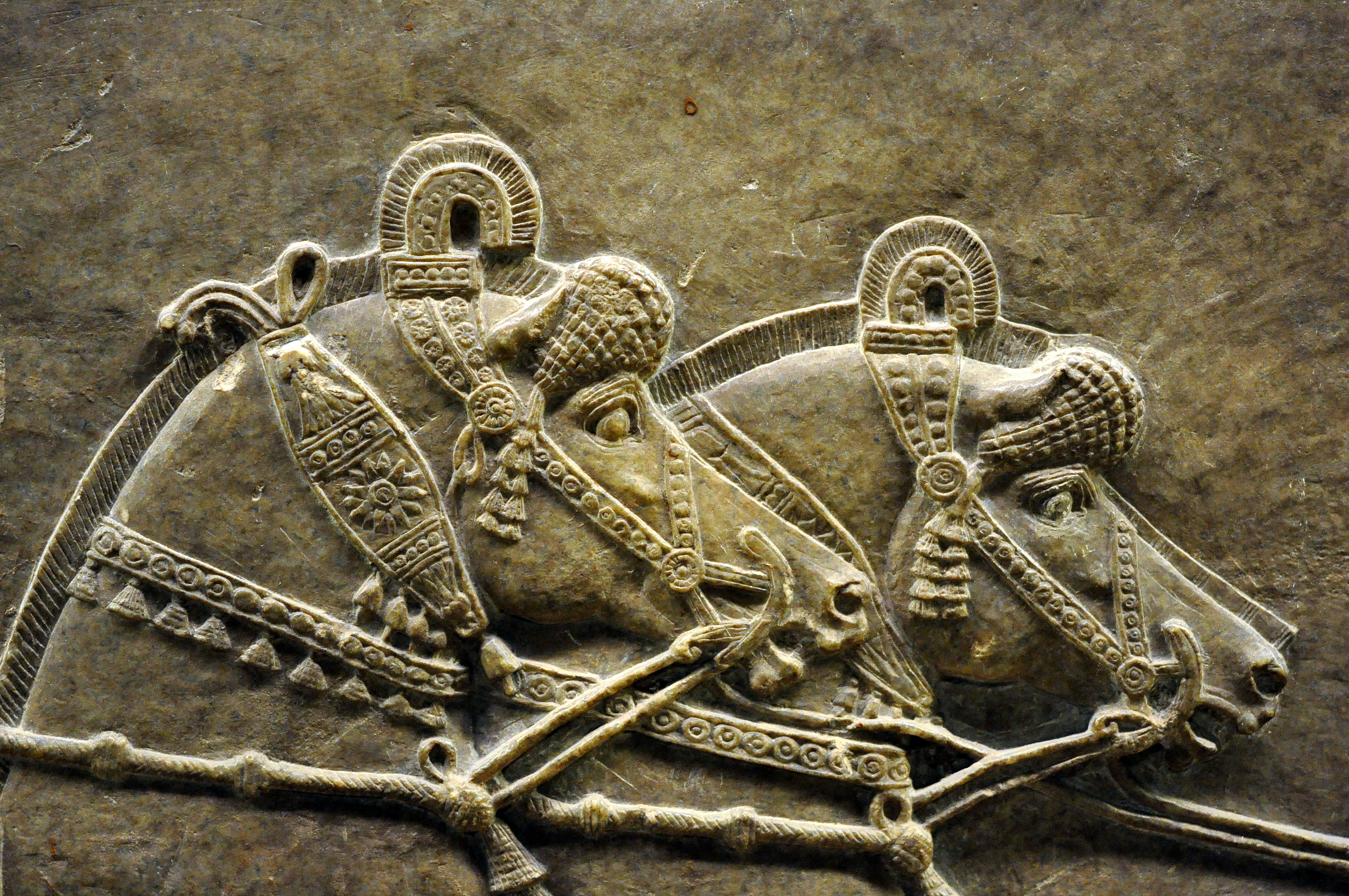
Assyrian horses, Lion Hunt of Ashurbanipal reliefs from Nineveh, 7th century BCE

The horse appeared in prehistoric cave paintings such as those in Lascaux, estimated to be about 17,000 years old.

Prehistoric hill figures have been carved in the shape of the horse, specifically the Uffington White Horse, an example of the tradition of horse carvings upon hillsides, which having existed for thousands of years continues into the current age.

The Upper Palaeolithic Vogelherd figurines discovered in Germany, miniature sculptures made of mammoth ivory attributed to paleo-humans of the Aurignacian culture that are among the world's oldest-known works of figurative art, include a figure of a horse.

=== Ancient World ===
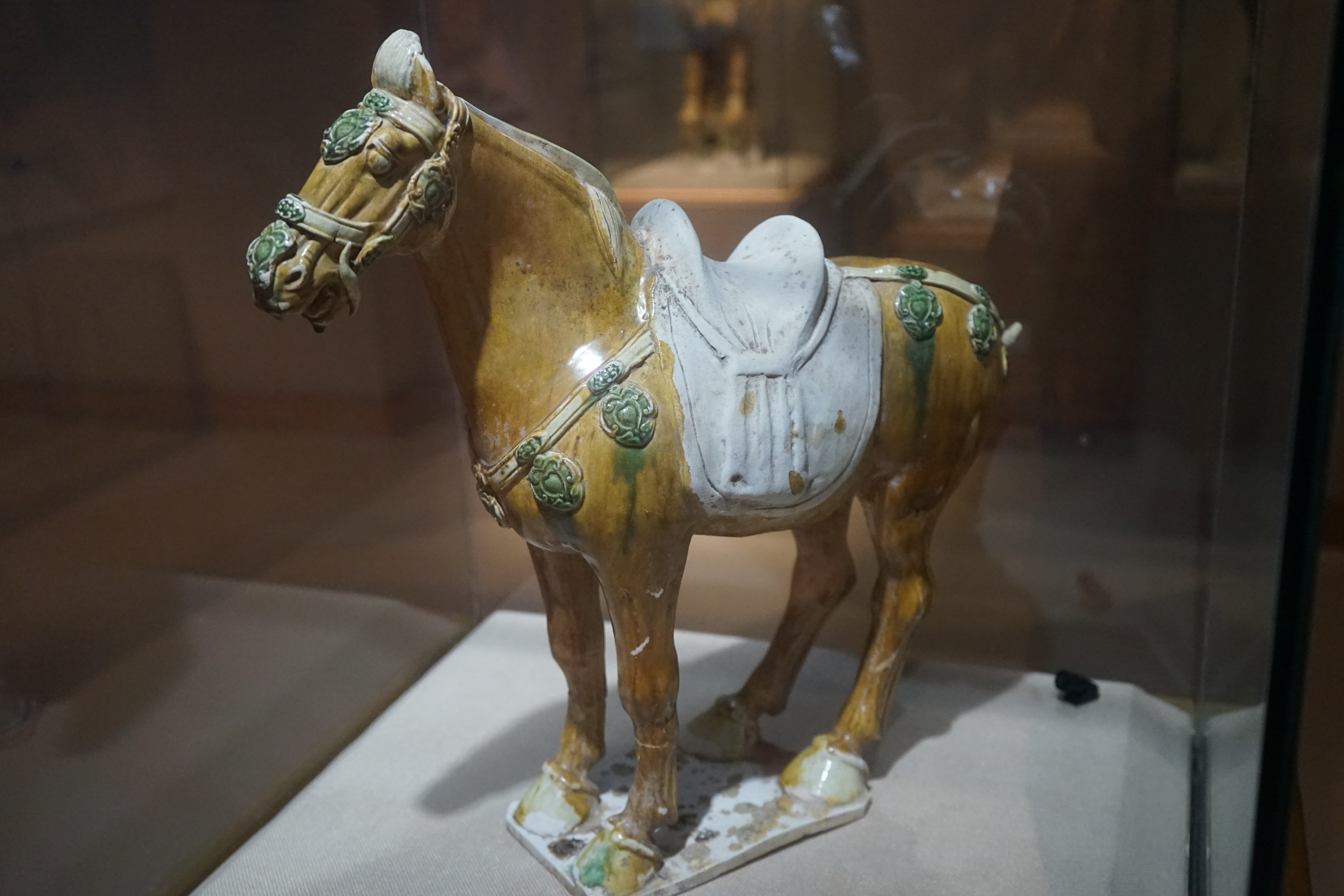
Horse and saddle, Tang dynasty

The equine image was common in ancient Egyptian and Grecian art, more refined images displaying greater knowledge of equine anatomy appeared in Classical Greece and later Roman work. Horse-drawn chariots were commonly depicted in ancient works, for example on the Standard of Ur circa 2500BC.

The Greeks and Romans invented the equestrian statue; the best surviving example being the Equestrian statue of Marcus Aurelius in Rome. The Horses of Saint Mark are the sole surviving example from Classical Antiquity of a monumental statue of the Quadriga.

The horse was less prevalent in early Christian and Byzantine art, overwhelmed by the dominance of religious themes.

=== Renaissance and after ===
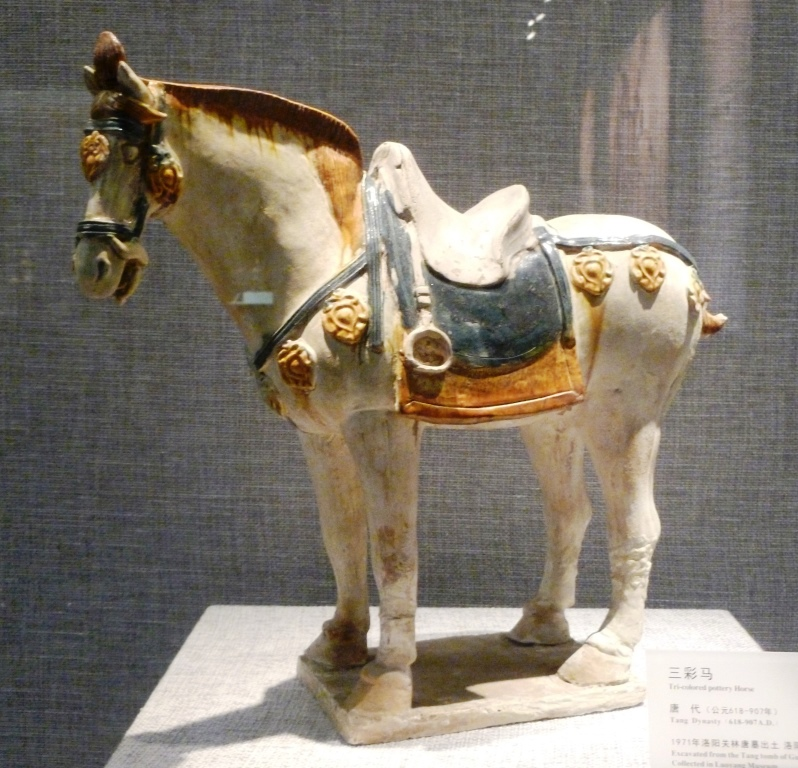
Tricolored horse. Luoyang Museum. Tang dynasty. 2011

The Renaissance period starting in the 14th century brought a resurgence of the horse in art. Painters of this period who portrayed the horse included Paolo Uccello, Benozzo Gozzoli, Leonardo da Vinci, Albrecht Dürer, Raphael, Andrea Mantegna, and Titian. In 1482 the Duke of Milan Ludovico il Moro, commissioned Leonardo da Vinci to create the largest equestrian statue in the world, a monument to the duke's father Francesco, however, Leonardo's horse was never completed, (until it was replicated in the late 20th century).

In the Baroque era, the tradition of equine portraiture was established, with artists such as Peter Paul Rubens, Anthony van Dyck and Diego Velázquez portraying regal subjects atop their mounts. Equine sporting art also became established in this era, as the tradition of horse racing emerged under Tudor patronage.

=== 18th and 19th centuries ===
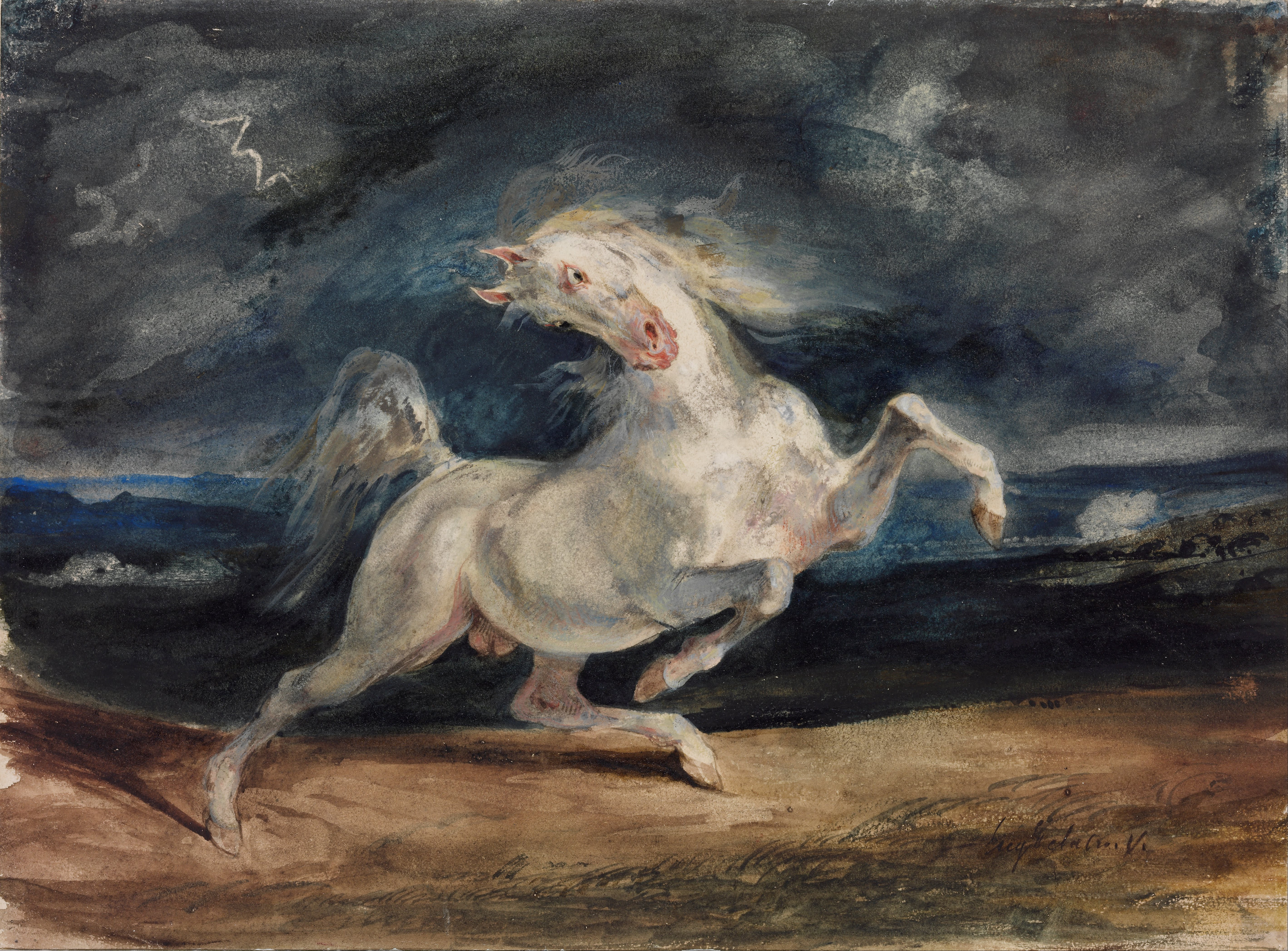
Eugène Delacroix, Horse Frightened by Lightning, 1825–1829, watercolour, lead white on paper, 23.6 × 32 cm, Museum of Fine Arts, Budapest

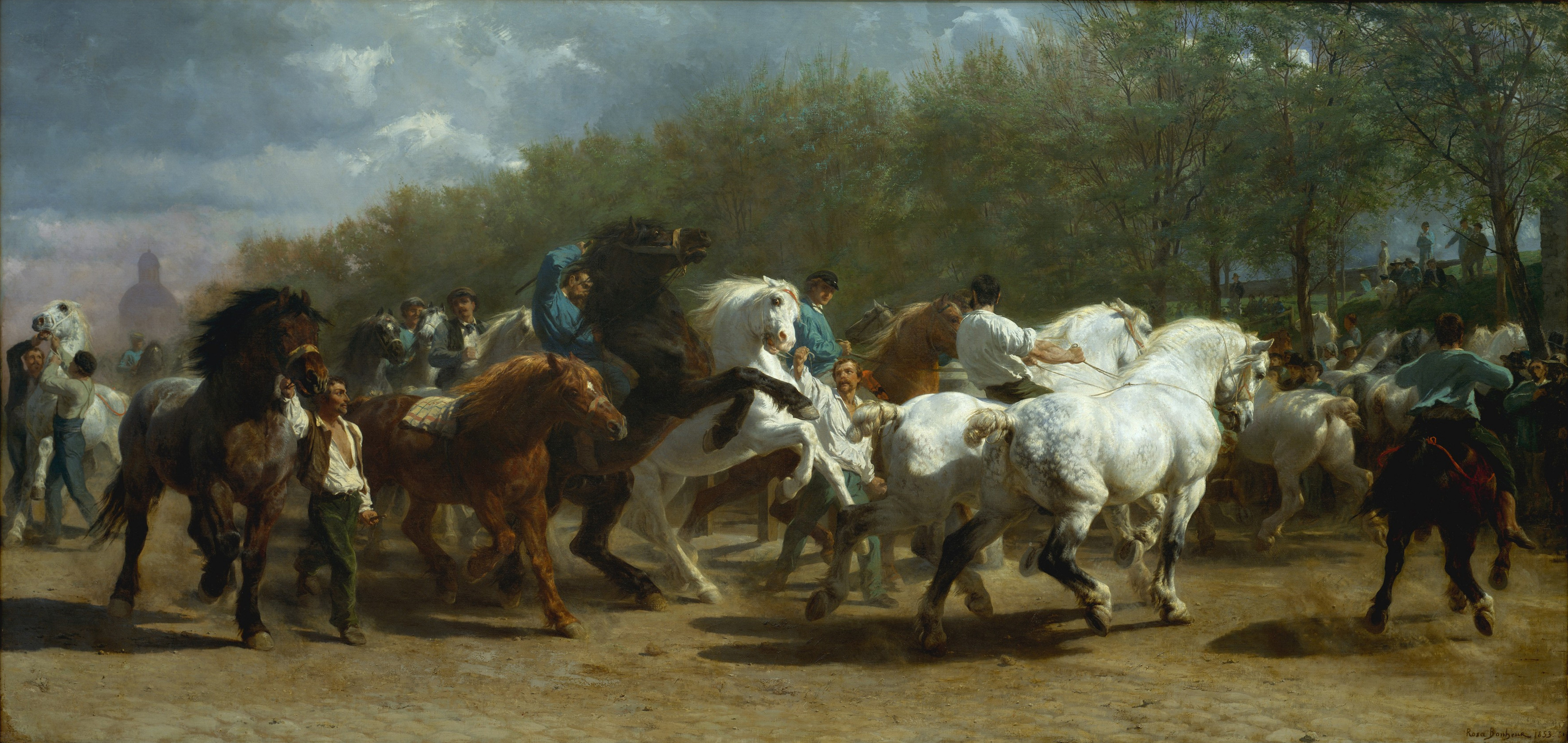
Rosa Bonheur, The Horse Fair, 1853–1855, Metropolitan Museum of Art

George Stubbs, born in 1724, became so associated with his equestrian subjects that he was known as "the horse painter". A childhood interest in anatomy was applied to the horse. He spent eighteen months dissecting equine carcasses and had an engraver produce bookplates of his studies. These anatomical drawings aided later artists.

The mid-18th century saw the emergence of Romanticism, French artists Théodore Géricault and Eugène Delacroix were proponents of this movement and both portrayed the horse in many of their works.

Equine sporting art was popular in the 19th century, with notable artists of the period being Benjamin Marshall, James Ward, Henry Thomas Alken, James Pollard, John Frederick Herring Sr., and Heywood Hardy. Horse racing gradually became more established in France, and Impressionist painter Edgar Degas painted many early racing scenes. Degas was one of the first horse painters to use photographic references. Eadweard Muybridge's photographic studies of animal motion had a huge influence on equine art, as they allowed artists greater understanding of the horses gaits.

Rosa Bonheur became famous primarily for two chief works: Ploughing in the Nivernais (in French: Le labourage nivernais, le sombrage), and, The Horse Fair (in French: Le marché aux chevaux) (which was exhibited at the Salon of 1853 (finished in 1855) and is now in the Metropolitan Museum of Art, in New York City. Bonheur is widely considered to have been the most famous female painter of the nineteenth century.

Isidore Bonheur, the younger brother of Rosa Bonheur, is known as one of the 19th century's most distinguished French animalier sculptors. He modeled his sculptures to catch movement or posture characteristic of the particular species. Isidore Bonheur achieved this most successfully with his sculptures of horses, usually depicted as relaxed rather than spirited, which are among his most renowned works.

=== 20th century ===
Sir Alfred Munnings was an acclaimed painter working in England during the 20th century. He was elected president of the Royal Academy in 1944. He specialised in equine subjects, including horse racing, portraiture, and studies of gypsies and rural life.

Mark Wallinger bought a chestnut racehorse and named her A Real Work of Art, as a readymade. The project also involved having 50 statuettes of a jockey on a chestnut horse, which have been exposed in art galleries around the world.

== Subject genres ==
=== Military and war ===
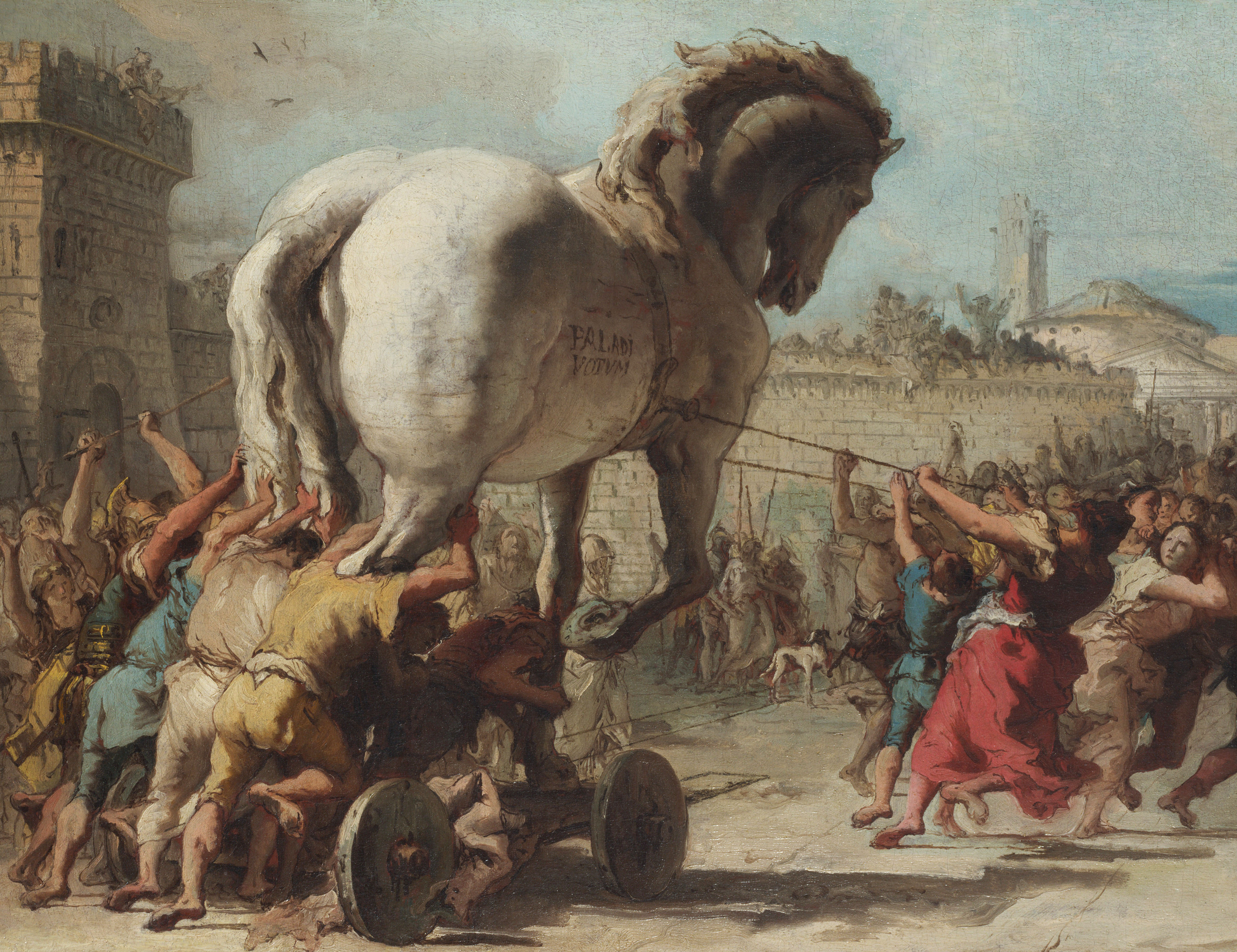
Giovanni Domenico Tiepolo, Detail from The Procession of the Trojan Horse in Troy, (1773), inspired by Virgil's Aeneid

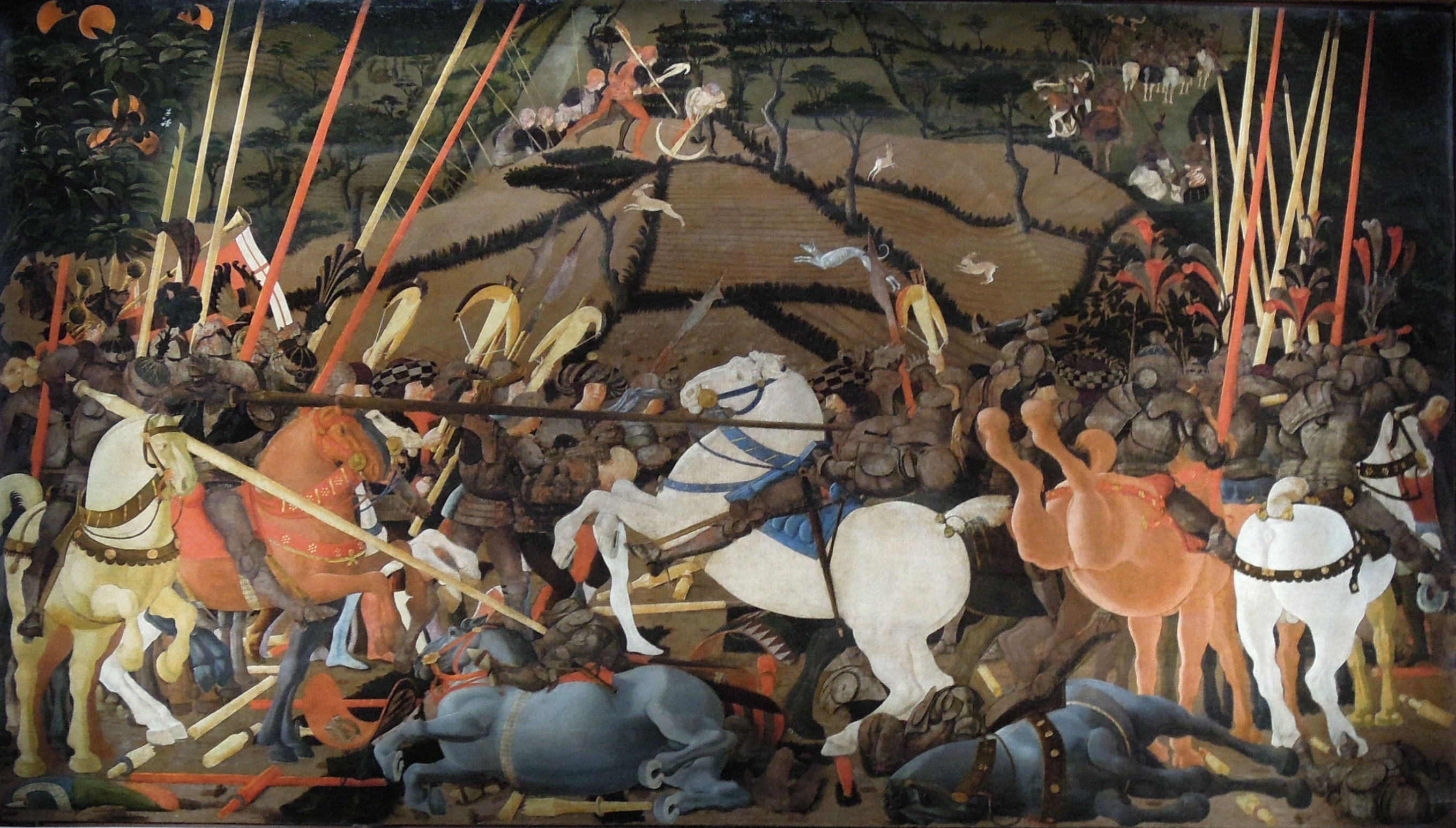
Uccello, The Battle of San Romano, c. 1438–1440. Egg tempera with walnut oil and linseed oil on poplar. 181.6 × 320 cm. Uffizi.

Military art often depicts the horse in battle and provides some of the earliest examples of the horse in art, with cavalry, horse-drawn chariots, and horse archers all appearing on ancient artifacts.

In the medieval period, cavalry battles and knights on horseback were portrayed by artists including Paolo Uccello and Albrecht Dürer. Uccello's tryptic The Battle of San Romano shows various stages of a battle. Dürer's engraving of "Knight, Death and the Devil", 1513 shows a military subject combined with an allegorical theme.

Sir Alfred Munnings was appointed as a war artist during World War I; he painted both the Canadian Cavalry Brigade and the Canadian Forestry Corps stationed in France. He considered his experiences with the Canadian units to have been among the most rewarding events of his life.

Elizabeth Thompson, known as Lady Butler, was famed for her military art, especially Scotland Forever featuring a dramatic charge by the Royal Scots Greys.

=== Horse racing ===
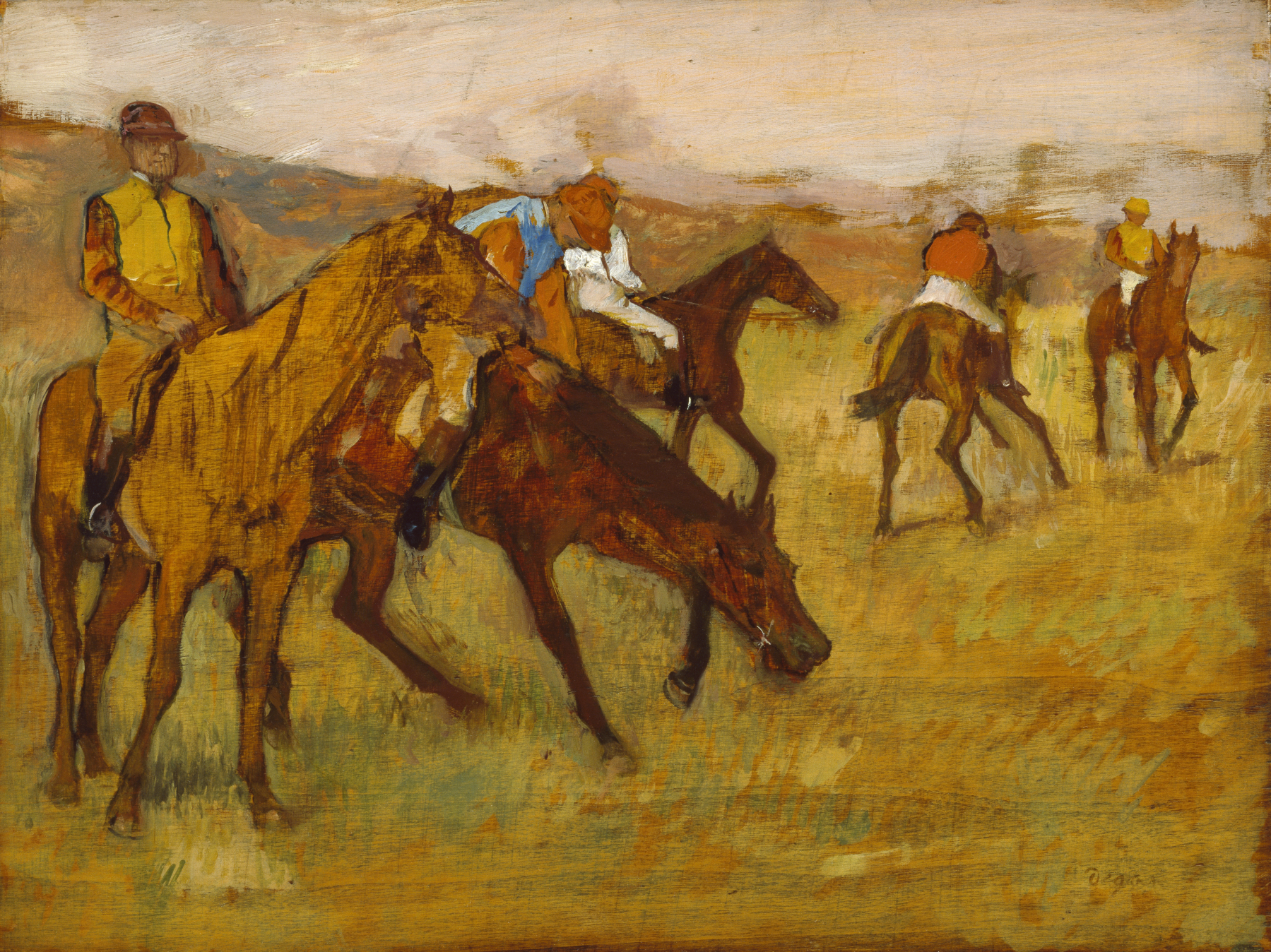
Edgar Degas, Before the Race, 1882–1884, oil on panel, The Walters Art Museum, Baltimore

Eadweard Muybridge's Animal Locomotion features an animated sequence of a race horse galloping, using photos published in 1887.

Thoroughbred racing was an inspiration for Romantic and Impressionist artists of the 19th century. Théodore Géricault painted The Derby in 1821 during his stay in England. The Impressionist era coincided with the development of racing in France, Manet, Degas, and Toulouse-Lautrec all acquired a lasting fascination with racing. Manet showed the excitement and action of the race and Degas concentrated more on the moments before the start. Degas was intensely interested in Eadweard Muybridge's photographs of the horse in motion included in Muybridge's Animal Locomotion, and he copied them in chalk and pencil and used them for reference in his later work.

Generations of artists before Muybridge had portrayed the horse in a 'rocking horse' gallop, with the horse portrayed with both front legs extended forward, and both hind legs extended rearwards. Much more realistic representations were possible after the event of photography and Muybridge's work, but that did not necessarily lead to the impression of movement in the artwork. Luard writing in 1921 compares the running action of an animal with the run and rhythm of an air in music, but the instantaneous moment recorded by a photograph as a detached chord with little meaning or context.

George Stubbs and Alfred Munnings have both left a vast body of work involving the racehorse.

In the 20th century, much of the artwork by John Skeaping involved the racing scene, including life-size bronzes of Hyperion and Brigadier Gerard and watercolours of racecourse action.

=== The American West ===
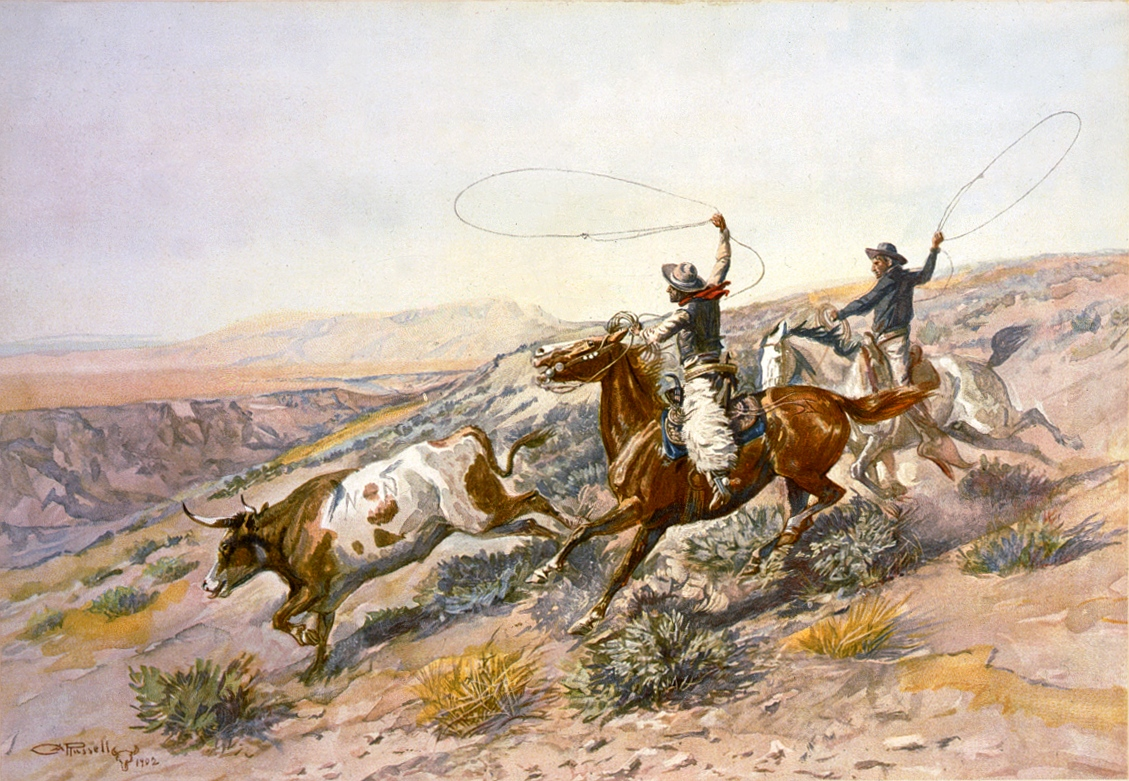
Charles Marion Russell, Buccaroos, 1902

Artwork associated with the historic cowboy or Native American tradition of the American west naturally includes many equine subjects. Artists of the American West include Frederic Remington and C.M. Russell who are known for their paintings of equine subjects. Remington was one of the first American artists to illustrate the true gait of the horse in motion (along with Thomas Eakins), as validated by the famous sequential photographs of Eadweard Muybridge. Remington also captured equine drama in his bronze sculptures, his first, Bronco Buster (Williams College Museum of Art), was a critical and commercial success.

=== Modern art ===
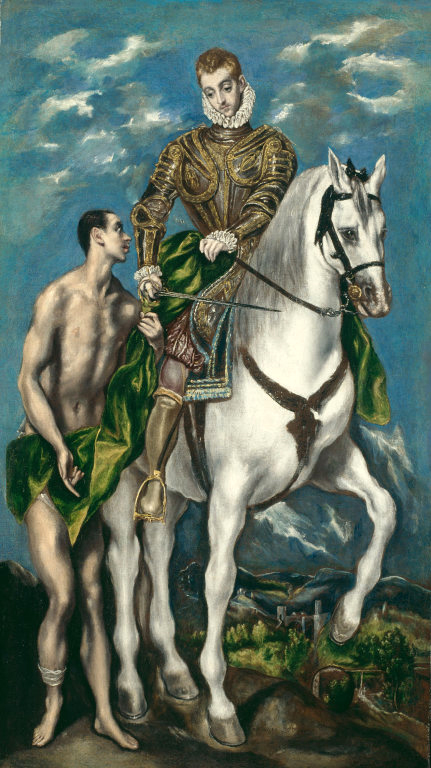
El Greco, Saint Martin and the Beggar, c. 1597–1600, Art Institute of Chicago

Pablo Picasso, Boy Leading a Horse, 1905-06, Museum of Modern Art, New York. Picasso's Rose period masterpiece, recalls the painting of El Greco.

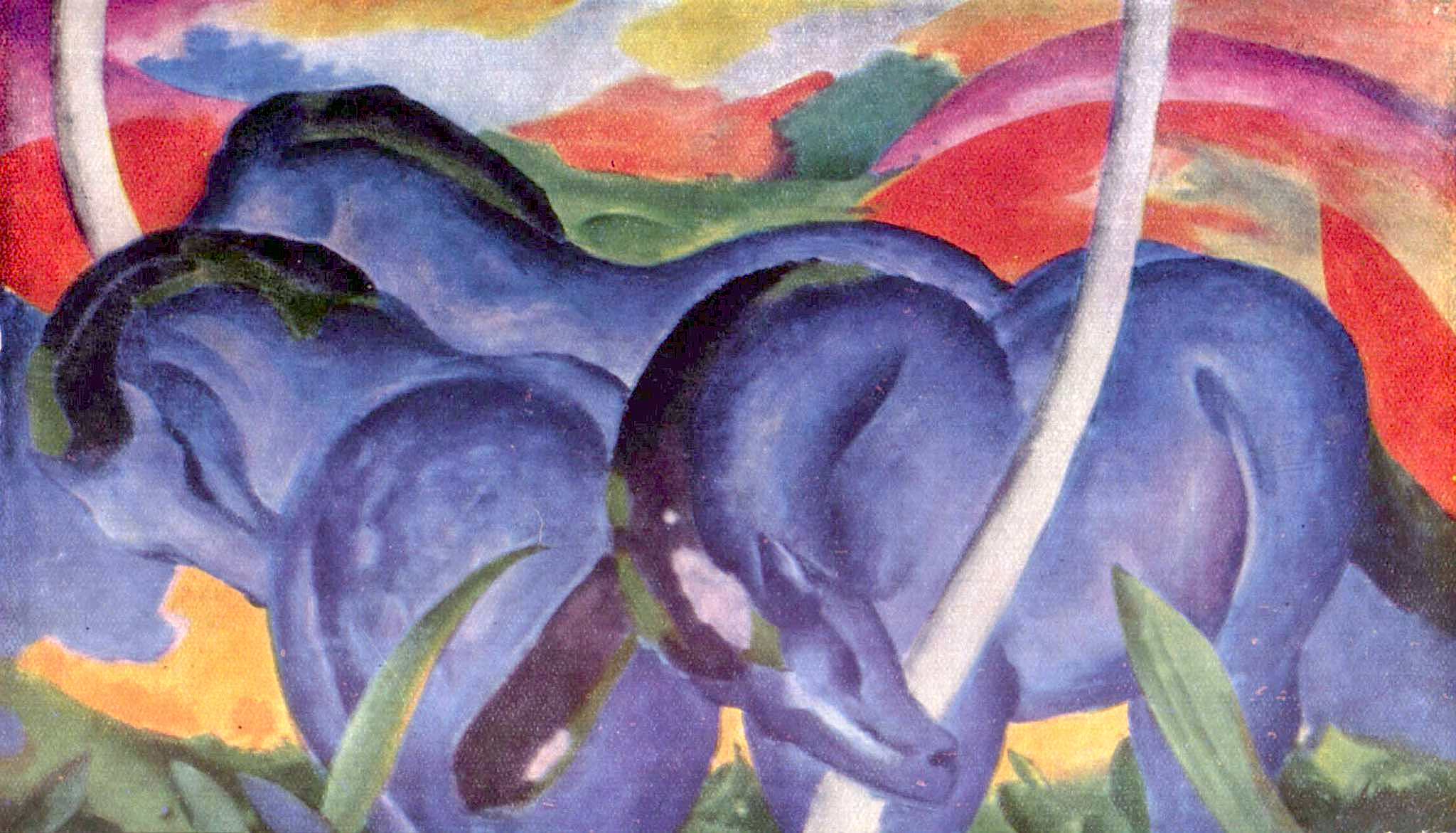
Franz Marc, The Large Blue Horses, 1911, Walker Art Center

Inspired by El Greco's, Saint Martin and the Beggar, c. 1597–1600, Art Institute of Chicago Pablo Picasso introduced horses into his work in 1905-06 notably Boy Leading a Horse, Museum of Modern Art. Franz Marc and others including Susan Rothenberg and Deborah Butterfield beginning in the 1970s used horses as motifs in their paintings and sculpture throughout the 20th century. For a large and complex 20th-century war painting in which a horse is the central dramatic figure, see Guernica by Pablo Picasso. While Impressionist painter Edgar Degas was particularly famous for his paintings of dancers, Degas was also known for his paintings of horses and horse racing.

=== Hunting ===
Hunting scenes have been a common subject matter for equestrian painters. Specialists in fox hunting subjects include Cecil Aldin and Lionel Edwards.

=== Rural/working life ===
Lucy Kemp-Welch was well known for her depiction of wild and working horses in the landscape.

== Gallery ==
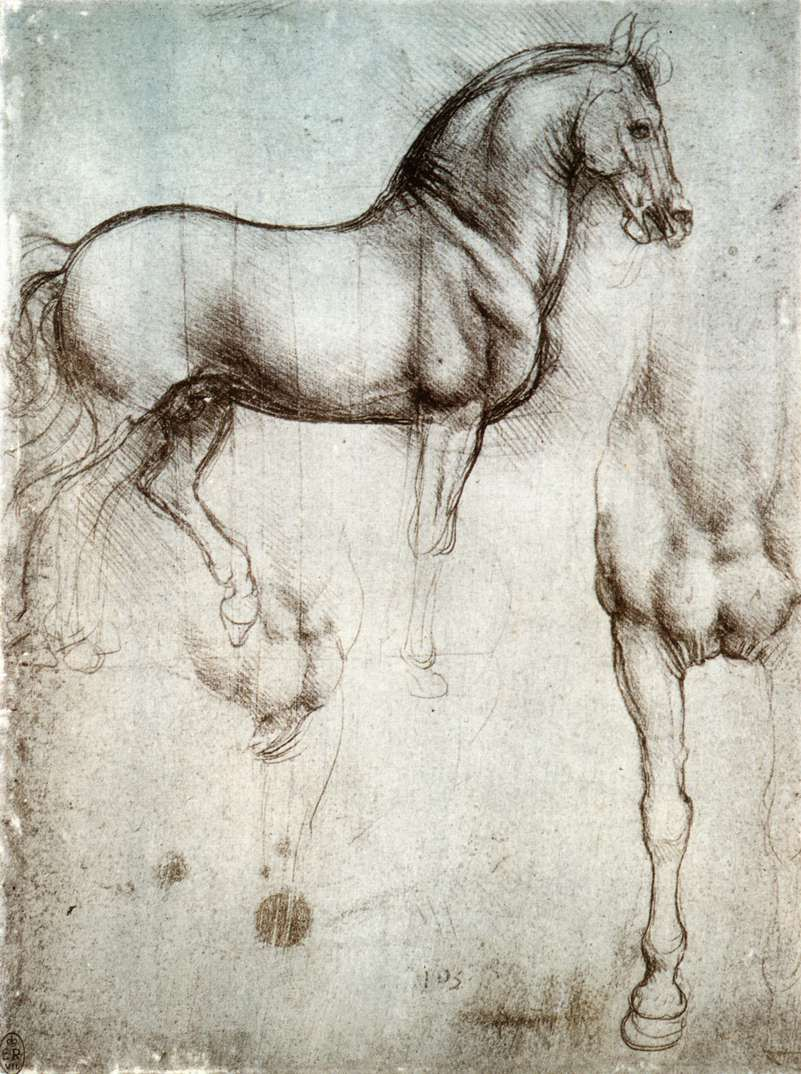
Leonardo da Vinci's study of horses, c. 1490, – Monuments

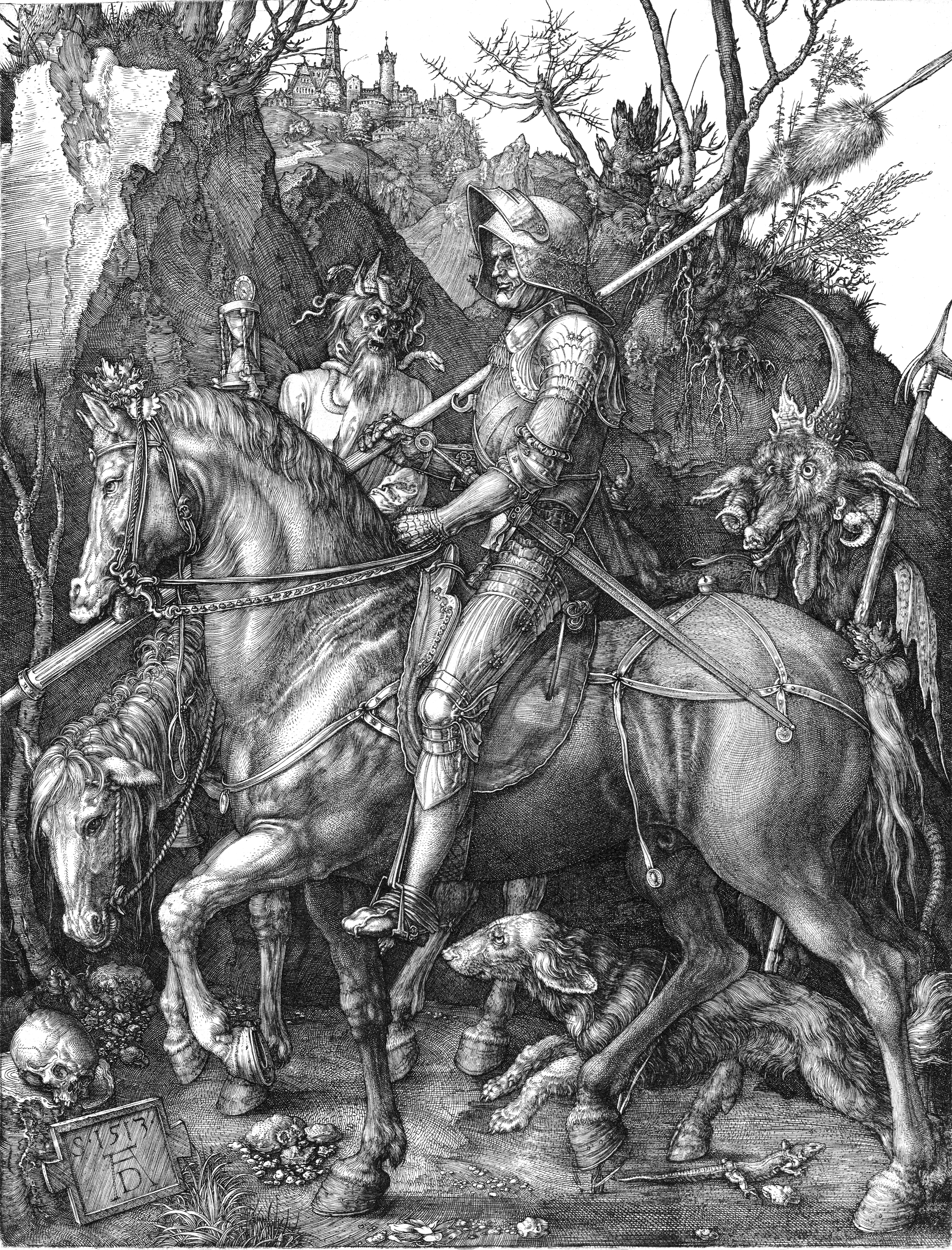
Albrecht Dürer, Knight, Death and the Devil 1513, – Military and War

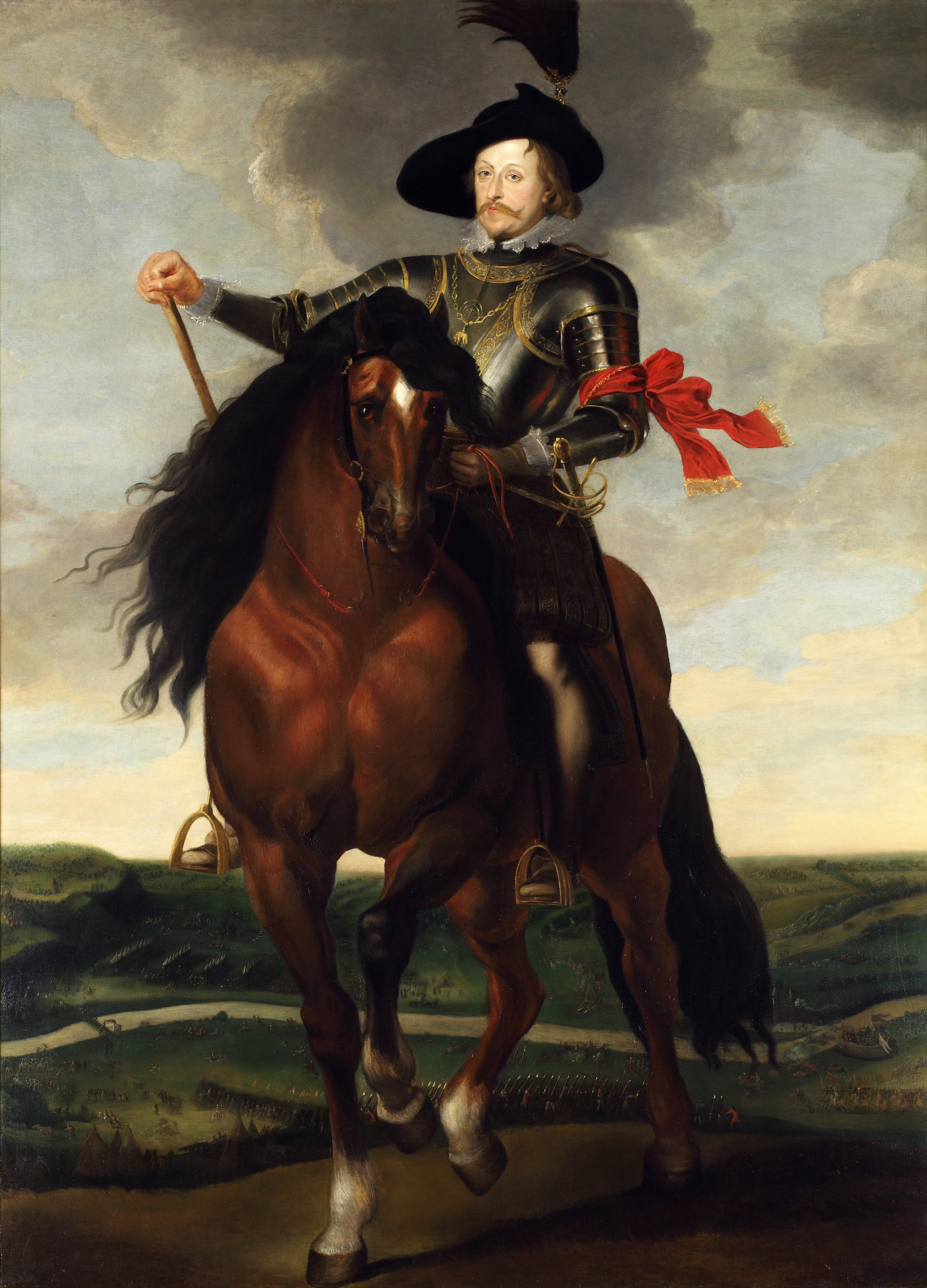
Peter Paul Rubens, Equestrian portrait of Crown Prince Władysław Vasa with the Battle of Khotyn in the background, 1624, – Baroque style

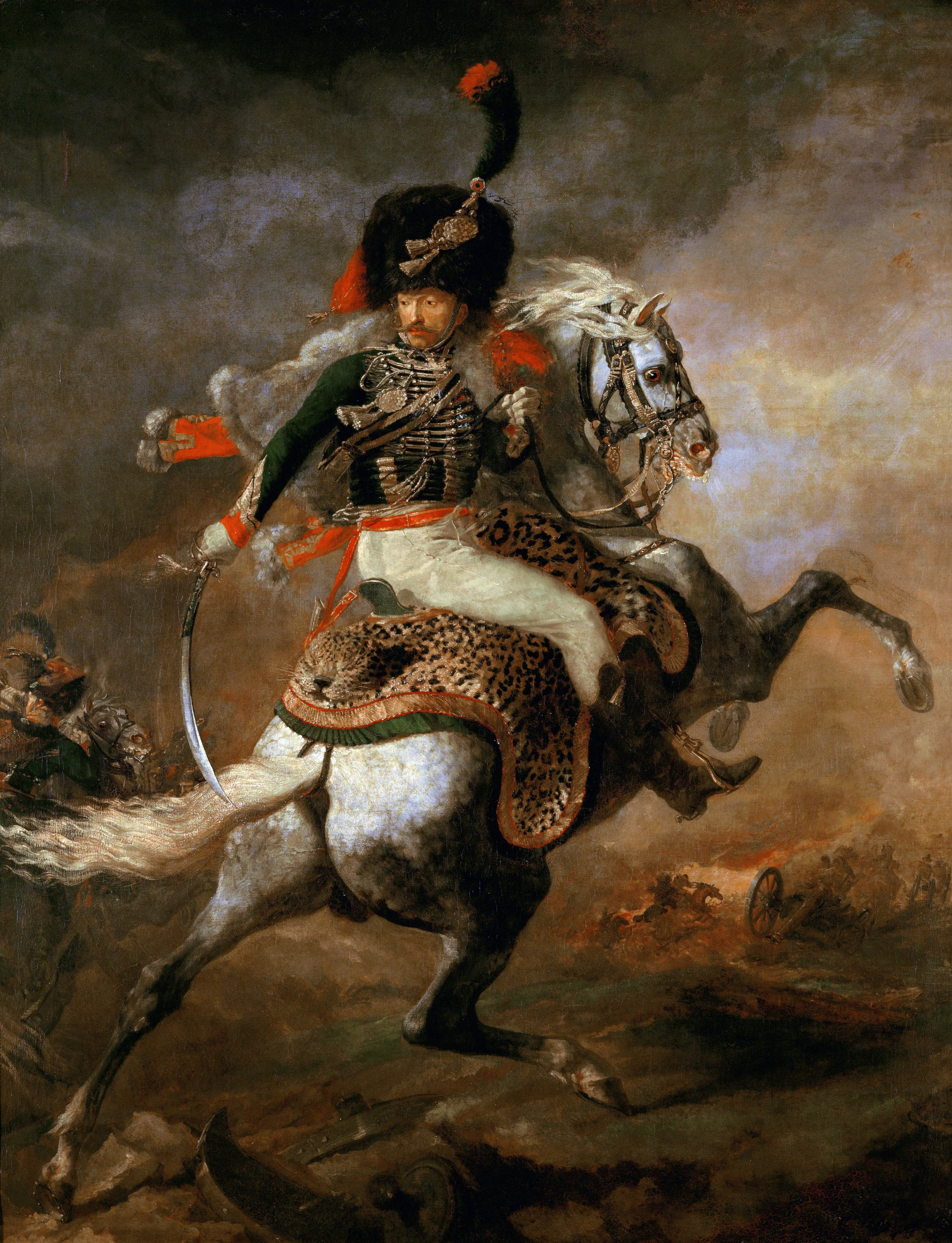
Théodore Géricault, An Officer of the Imperial Horse Guards Charging, 1812, – Military and War

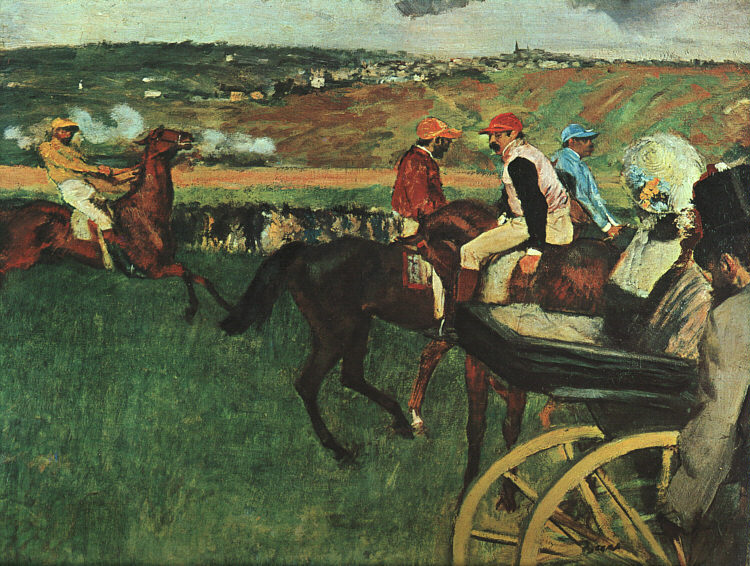
Edgar Degas, At the Races, 1877–1880, Musée d'Orsay, Paris – Horse Racing

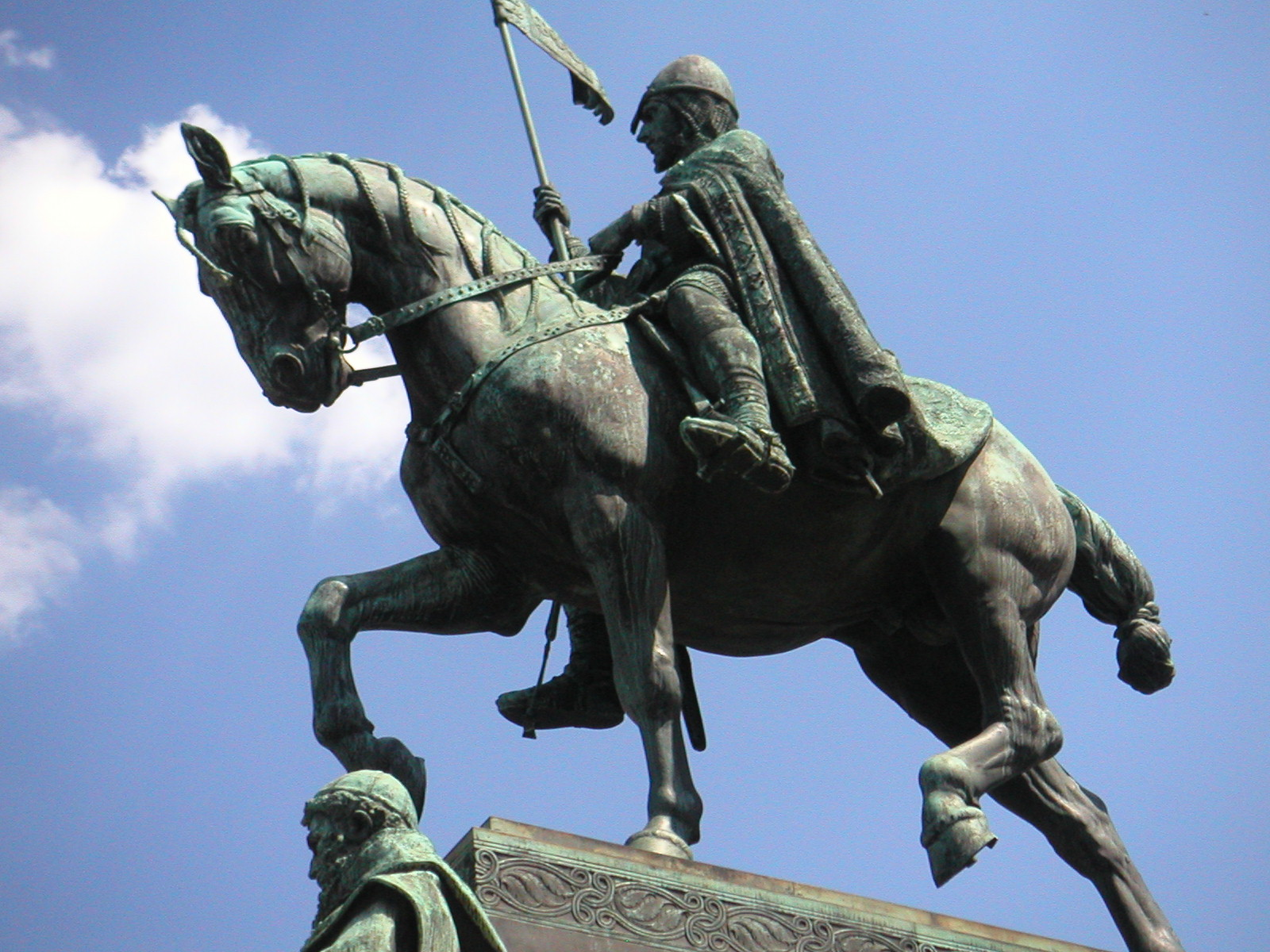
Josef Václav Myslbek, Statue of Saint Wenceslas, 1887–1924, Wenceslas Square, in Prague – Military and War

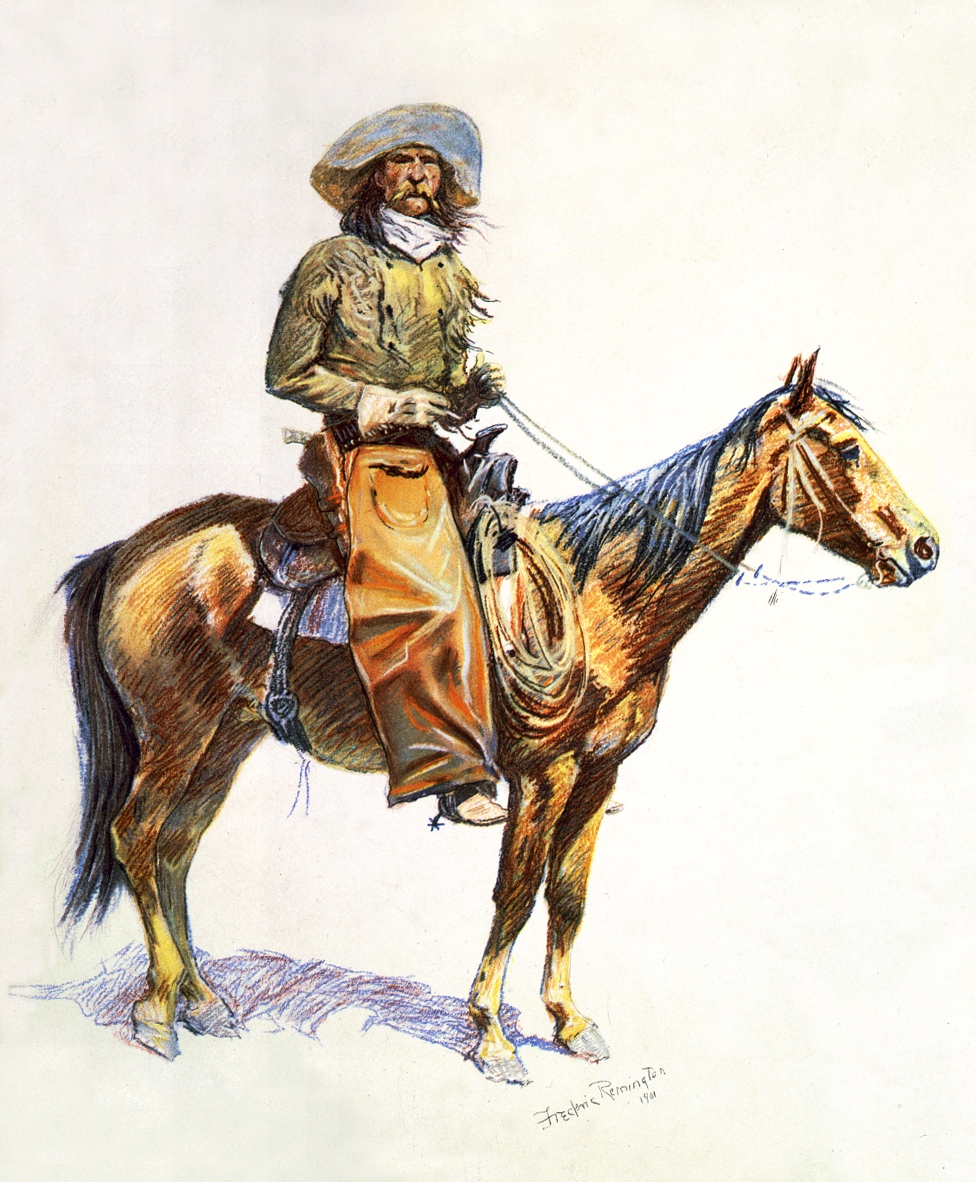
Frederic Remington, Arizona cowboy 1901, lithograph – The American West

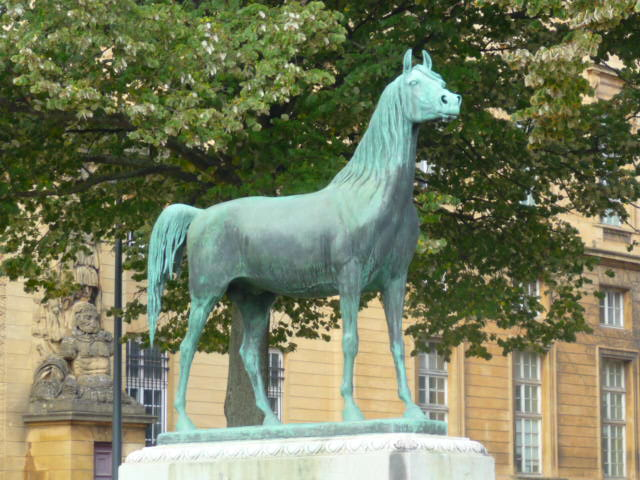
Christopher Fratin, Horse, c. 1850, bronze, animalier, Metz, France – Animal art

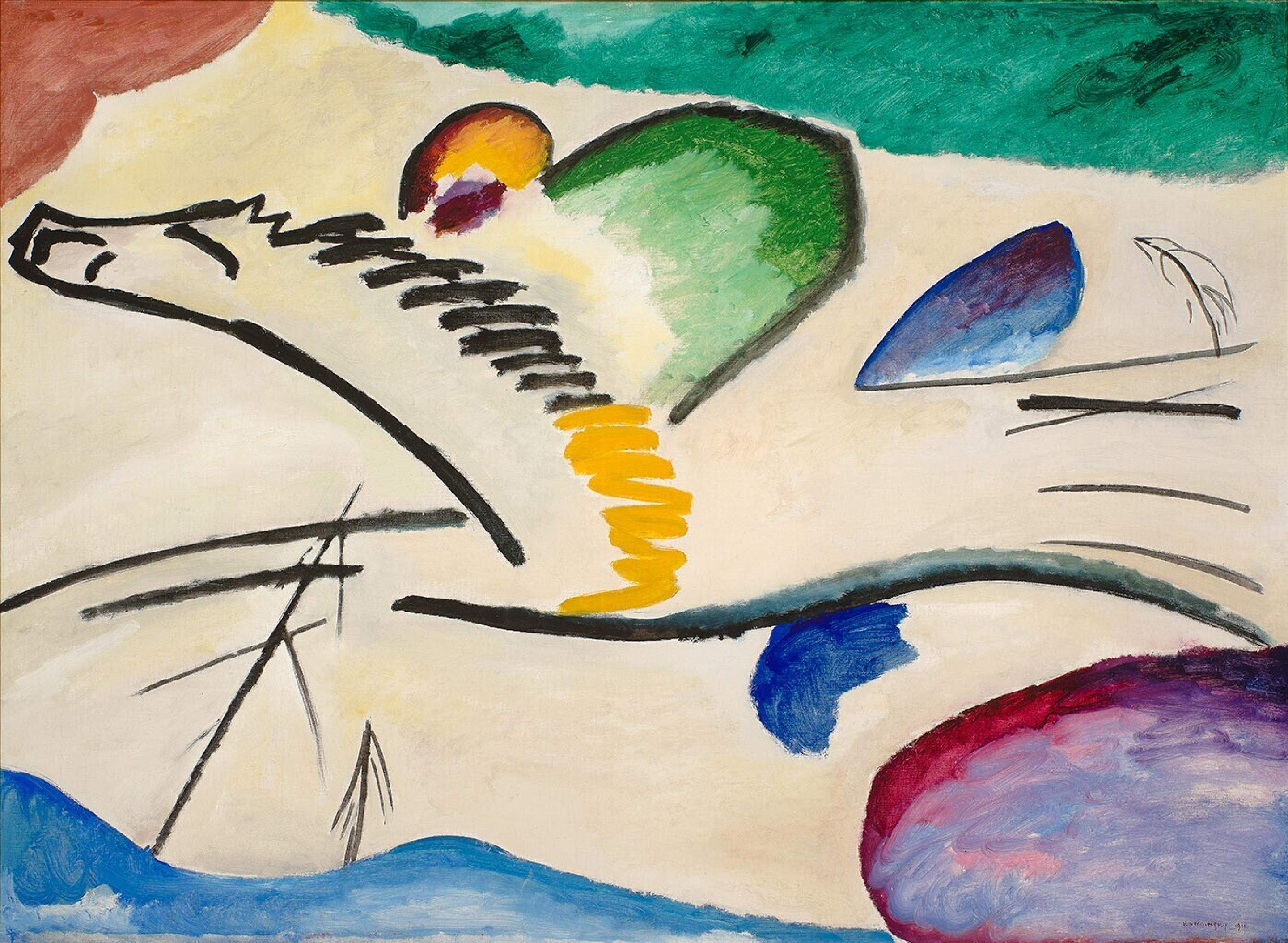
Wassily Kandinsky, 1911, Reiter (Lyrishes), oil on canvas, 94 x 130 cm, Museum Boijmans Van Beuningen, Rotterdam – Expressionism

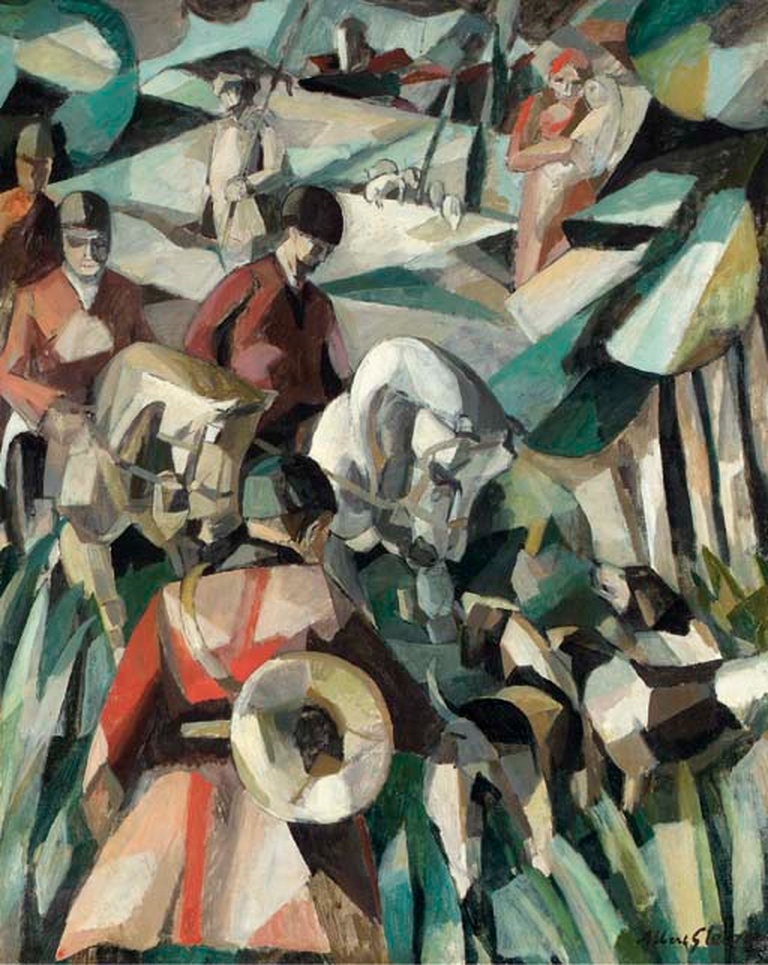
Albert Gleizes, 1911, La Chasse (The Hunt), oil on canvas, 123.2 x 99 cm. Exhibited at the 1911 Salon d'Automne and Salon de la Section d'Or, Paris, 1912 – Cubism

Jean Metzinger, 1911–1912, La Femme au Cheval (Woman with a horse), oil on canvas, 162 x 130 cm, National Gallery of Denmark. Provenance: Jacques Nayral, Niels Bohr – Cubism

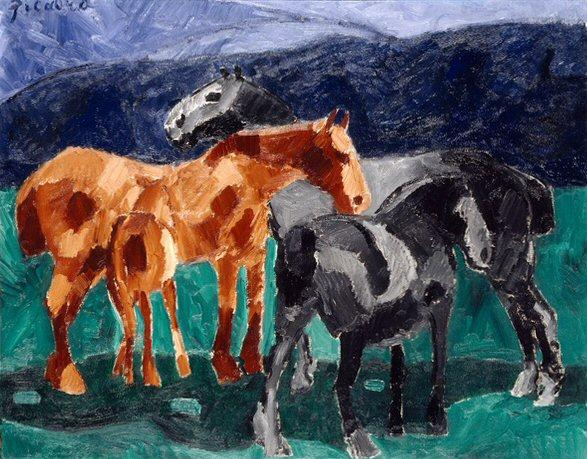
Francis Picabia, 1911, Horses, oil on canvas, 73.3 x 92.5 cm, Musée National d'Art Moderne, Centre Georges Pompidou, Paris – Post-Impressionism

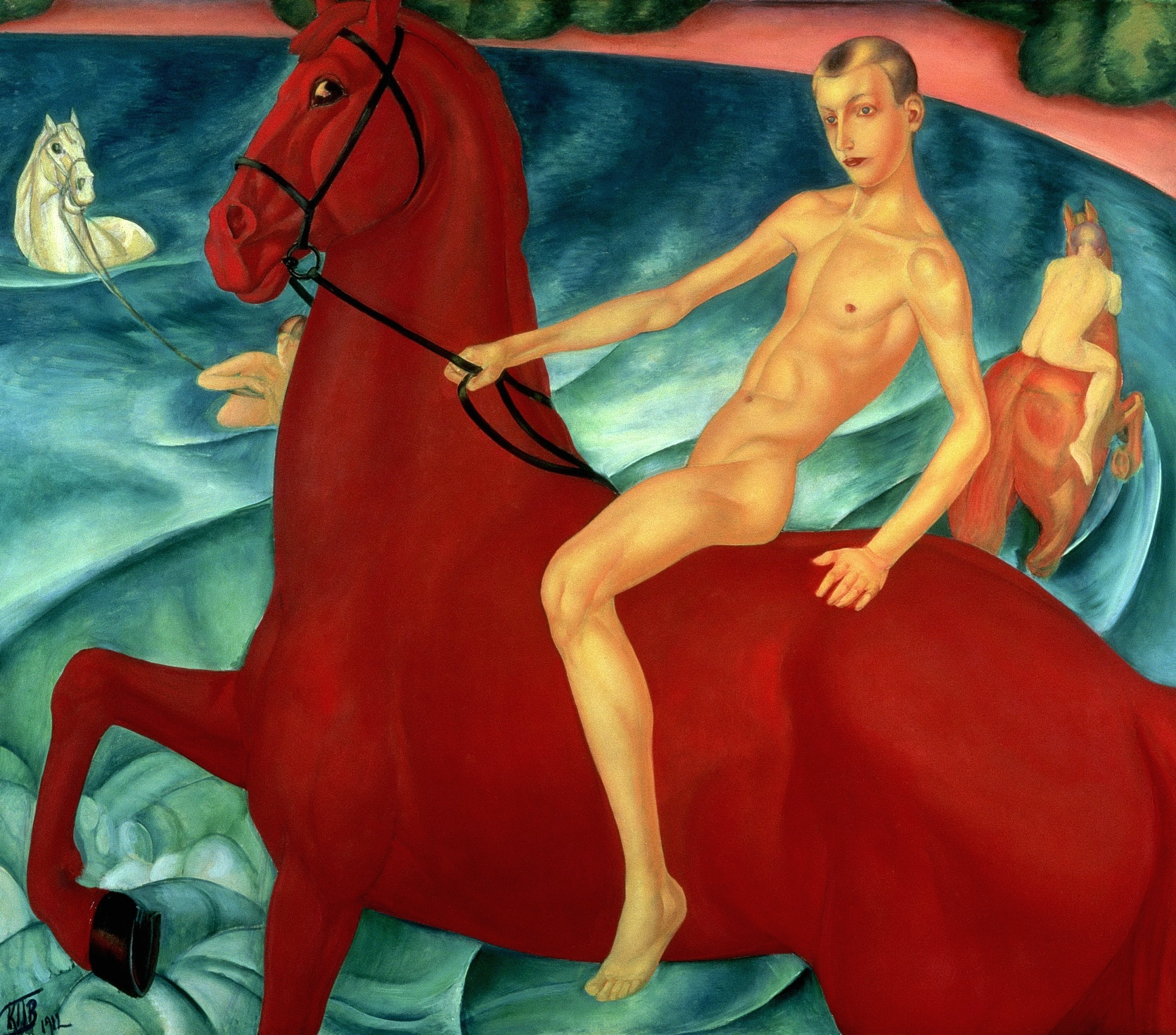
Kuzma Petrov-Vodkin, 1912, Bathing of a Red Horse, oil on canvas, 160 × 186 cm, Tretyakov Gallery, Moscow – Symbolism

Jacques Lipchitz, 1914, Acrobat on Horseback (Acrobate à cheval) – Cubism

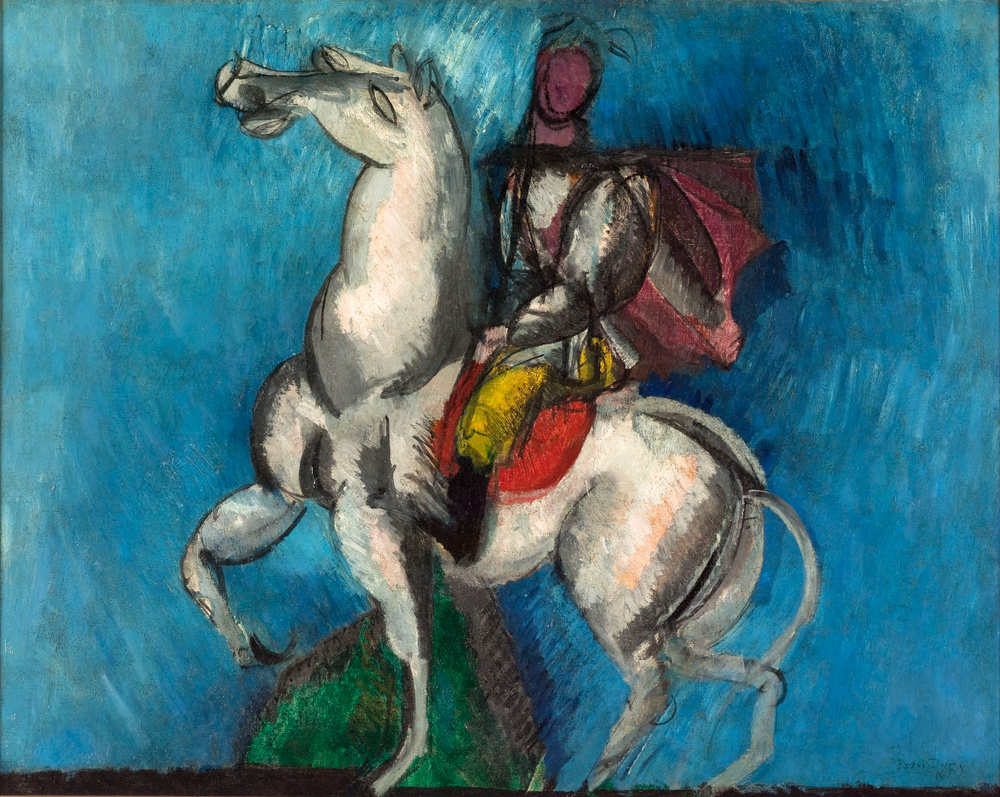
Raoul Dufy, 1914, Le Cavalier arabe, oil on canvas, 66 x 81 cm, Musée d'Art Moderne de la Ville de Paris – Modernism

Chana Orloff, 1915, Amazone, bronze, 73.5 cm – Cubism, Art deco

Olaf Rude, 1918, Saint George and the dragon, oil on canvas, 99.7 x 79.9 cm, ARoS Aarhus Kunstmuseum – Cubism

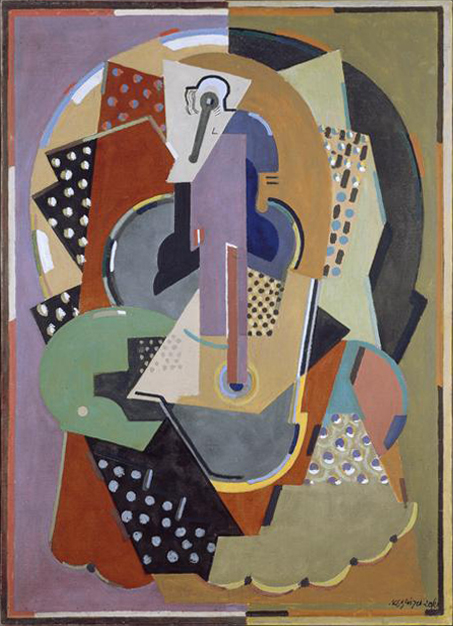
Albert Gleizes, 1920–1923, Ecuyère (Horsewoman), oil on canvas, 130 x 93 cm, Musée des Beaux-Arts de Rouen, Centre Pompidou, 1998 – Cubism, Abstract art

Joan Miró, 1920, Horse, Pipe and Red Flower, oil on canvas, 82.6 x 74.9 cm, Philadelphia Museum of Art – Cubism, Surrealism

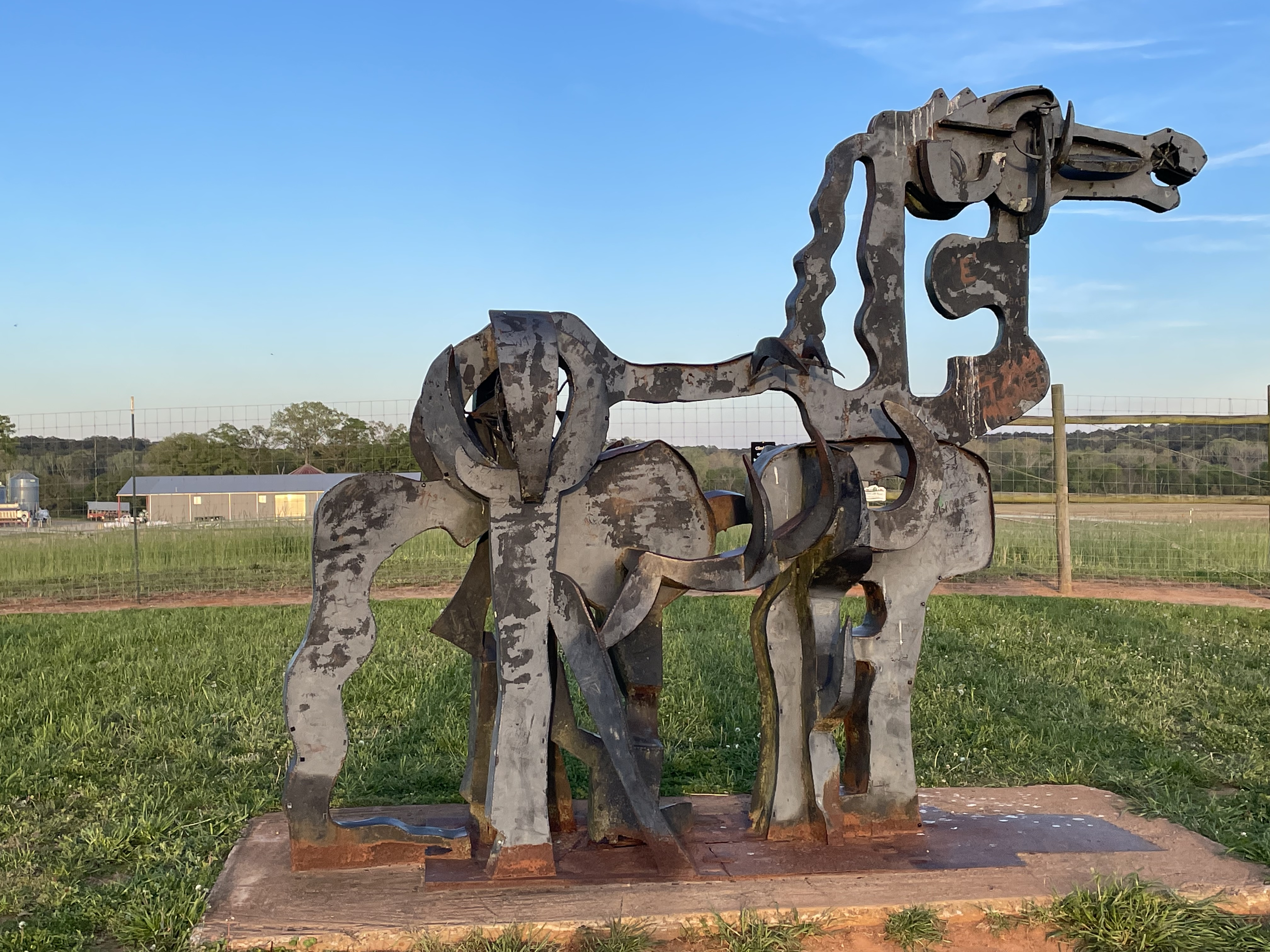
Abbott Pattison, 1954, Iron Horse, iron – Abstract art

== See also ==
- Equestrian statue
- Cultural legacy of Mazeppa
