= A Real Work of Art =

Race horse owned by Mark Wallinger

A Real Work of Art is a piece of art by Mark Wallinger and a racehorse that ran a single race on 26 September 1994.

== History and reception ==
Wallinger had always been a racing aficionado, and at first didn't want to mix this hobby with his art. However, he felt that the racing world was an "exaggerated microcosm of British society", with a lot of attention to class, blood lines, and "good marriages". Therefore, he decided to bring this theme into his art. Then, in 1993, he decided to buy a racehorse. Twelve people came together to finance the purchase. Later, Wallinger also sold objects related to the horse, such as vet bills, racesheets, hoofprints, and a series of fifty small statuettes of a jockey wearing Wallinger's colours (emerald green, white and violet, the same as the Suffragette's movement colours) on a chestnut horse.

The horse chosen was a chestnut filly born on 6 March 1992 in Ireland. It was bought and trained by Sir Mark Prescott, with whom Wallinger communicated about the project. Prescott said that the horse needed to be trained before racing.

Wallinger intended the horse to run for seasons, for her runs to be televised, and to draw a lot of attention. However, she ran a single race against 12 other horses, was injured, came out last, and never ran again.

The piece has been described as a "flesh and bone readymade". In a 2001 interview, Wallinger said that he felt Duchamp's readymades had been lazily interpreted, and that objects needed not be put into a museum to be considered pieces of art. So he decided to push the concept, and nominated "not only an object, but a living object that would exist as an artwork without ever going near a gallery", because he felt the art gallery was not the only institution with the power to decide what is art.

The statuettes, which are part of the project, have been in expositions in the National Museum of Art of Romania, the Macedonian Museum of Modern Art, the Museo De Artes Visuales Alejandro Otero inside the La Rinconada Hippodrome in Venezuela, amongst other places.

Thompson writes that the work of art is an effort to "rescue reality ... from the snappy jaws of representation". Allen writes that the piece is "conceptual".

The horse was later bought by a German collector.

== Pedigree ==
Pedigree of A Real Work of Art (IRE)
Sire Keen (GB)	Sharpen Up (GB)	Atan	Native Dancer
Sire Keen (GB)	Sharpen Up (GB)	Atan	Mixed Marriage
Sire Keen (GB)	Sharpen Up (GB)	Rocchetta (GB)	Rockefella (GB)
Sire Keen (GB)	Sharpen Up (GB)	Rocchetta (GB)	Chambiges (FR)
Sire Keen (GB)	Doubly Sure (GB)	Reliance II (FR)	Tantieme (FR)
Sire Keen (GB)	Doubly Sure (GB)	Reliance II (FR)	Relance (FR)
Sire Keen (GB)	Doubly Sure (GB)	Soft Angels	Crepello (GB)
Sire Keen (GB)	Doubly Sure (GB)	Soft Angels	Sweet Angel (GB)
Dam Nememsha	Roberto	Hail to Reason	Turn-to
Dam Nememsha	Roberto	Hail to Reason	Nothirdchance
Dam Nememsha	Roberto	Bramalea	Nashua
Dam Nememsha	Roberto	Bramalea	Rarelea
Dam Nememsha	Nasseem (FR)	Zeddaan (GB)	Grey Sovereign (GB),
Dam Nememsha	Nasseem (FR)	Zeddaan (GB)	Vareta (FR)
Dam Nememsha	Nasseem (FR)	Noureen	Astec (FR)
Dam Nememsha	Nasseem (FR)	Noureen	Nubena

== Progeny ==
A Real Work of Art gave birth to racehorses Art Point, Art Affair, and Art Attack.

== Intervention ==
A toto world intervention is evident in the Swedish race horse One Kind Of Art (b. 2016).
