= Thannhauser =

Thannhauser, Thannhäuser, Thanhauser, Thannhaeuser, etc. are German toponymic surnames associated with the places named Tannhausen, Thanhausen or Thannhausen, possibly Dannhausen.. Notable people with the surname include:

- Charlie Thannhaeuser, founder of Concord Blue, German renewable energy company
- Heinrich Thannhauser (1859–1924), German art dealer and collector
- Justin Thannhauser (1892–1976), German art dealer and collector, son of Heinrich

== See also ==
- Thannhauser Galleries, art dealership in Munich, Berlin and Lucerne
- Tannhäuser (disambiguation)
