= Portrait of Suzanne Bloch =

1904 painting by Pablo Picasso

- Artist: Pablo Picasso
- Year: 1904
- Medium: Oil on canvas
- Movement: Picasso's Blue Period, Post-Impressionism
- Dimensions: 65 cm × 54 cm (25.6 in × 21.3 in)
- Location: São Paulo Museum of Art, São Paulo

Portrait of Suzanne Bloch is an oil on canvas painting executed by the Spanish artist Pablo Picasso in Paris in 1904, towards the end of his Blue Period. The subject, Suzanne Bloch, was a singer known for her Wagner interpretations, and the sister of the violinist Henri Bloch. The painting is housed in the São Paulo Museum of Art.

== Background ==
A luminary in the Parisian sets frequented by Picasso at the beginning of the 20th century, Suzanne Bloch was a Wagnerian singer and the sister of the violinist Henri Bloch. She was introduced to the Spanish artist by the French poet Max Jacob, in 1904, and she sat for a portrait by Picasso in his Bateau-Lavoir studio at 13 rue Ravignan in Paris, between the late spring and early summer of that year. A pen and ink sketch heightened with gouache, and signed and dated by Picasso, preceded the oil painting; it is now conserved at the Neubury Coray collection, in Ascona, Switzerland.

== Description ==
The portrait in oils has been described by Luiz Marques, professor of art history at Unicamp, as exemplary of "the blue period, to which it fully belongs." It has been called the last important work of the blue period, although Palau i Fabre says that it is "difficult to date and determine the stage of transition from one period to the other—which in any case was not a sudden shift but a gently nuanced, though intermittent, progress". In a similar vein, Denys Chevalier has written: "Any attempt... to date the blue period too precisely can only lead to errors".

The painting, fully imbued with a somber, melancholy aura, is rendered in monochromatic shades, varying from blue to blue-green, with the sporadic presence of warmer tones. Nevertheless, it is possible to notice that the painting already announces some characteristics of a future transition in the Spanish painter's pictorial style, foreshadowing Cubism. In the words of Camesasca, quoted by Marques: "[…] this portrait is marked by the emergence of a reflection about the plastic-chromatic structure of Cézanne’s works, in the scope of a 'post-impressionism, already absorbed in the problems which will make the art explode."

== Provenance ==
The painting belonged to Suzanne Bloch, and was sold by her heirs after her death. The Thannhauser Gallery, Munich, sold the painting c. 1916 to Sally Falk, Mannheim, but his collection was already dispersed in 1919, under the supervision of the Paul Cassirer Gallery, Berlin, and Picasso's Lady without hat, blue portrait was acquired by Mechthild Princess Lichnowsky, who kept it at her private collection in London. From the English capital, the painting went to Lugano, in Switzerland, where it was held in the private collection of the Biber family. The painting remained on deposit at the National Gallery of Art, in Washington between 1942 and 1946. In the following year, it was acquired by the São Paulo Museum of Art (MASP), with financial resources donated by Walter Moreira Salles, founder of Unibanco.

== Theft ==
On 20 December 2007, the painting was stolen from the São Paulo Museum of Art. Around five o'clock in the morning, three men broke into the museum and stole Picasso's Portrait of Suzanne Bloch and Candido Portinari's O lavrador de café from the museum collection; the perpetrators were able to carry out the robbery in just three minutes, using a hydraulic jack and a crowbar. The estimated value of both artworks combined was US$55 million, with the portrait alone valued at US$50 million.

The paintings, which are listed as part of the Brazilian National Heritage by IPHAN, remained missing until 8 January 2008, when they were recovered in Ferraz de Vasconcelos by the Police of São Paulo, who also arrested two suspects. The paintings were returned, undamaged, to the São Paulo Museum of Art. The incident was described as "a major embarrassment" for the museum, which was not only forced to admit that they "had no alarm system and no sensors", but that its entire collection "was not insured".

== Exhibitions ==
The painting was exhibited at the Thannhauser Gallery in Berlin (1913); at the Museo Nacional de Bellas Artes in Buenos Aires (1939); at the M. H. de Young Memorial Museum in San Francisco (1940); at the famous exhibition From Cézanne to Picasso, in Los Angeles (1941); at the exhibition A Nova Pintura Francesa, in Rio de Janeiro (1949); at the Museu Picasso in Barcelona and at the Kunstmuseum in Bern, both in 1992; and at the Picasso retrospective, at the Musée Picasso, in Paris, carried out in 1994.

== See also ==
- Portrait of Angel Fernández de Soto
- The Actor
- Woman Ironing
