= Lords of Thannhausen =

German noble family

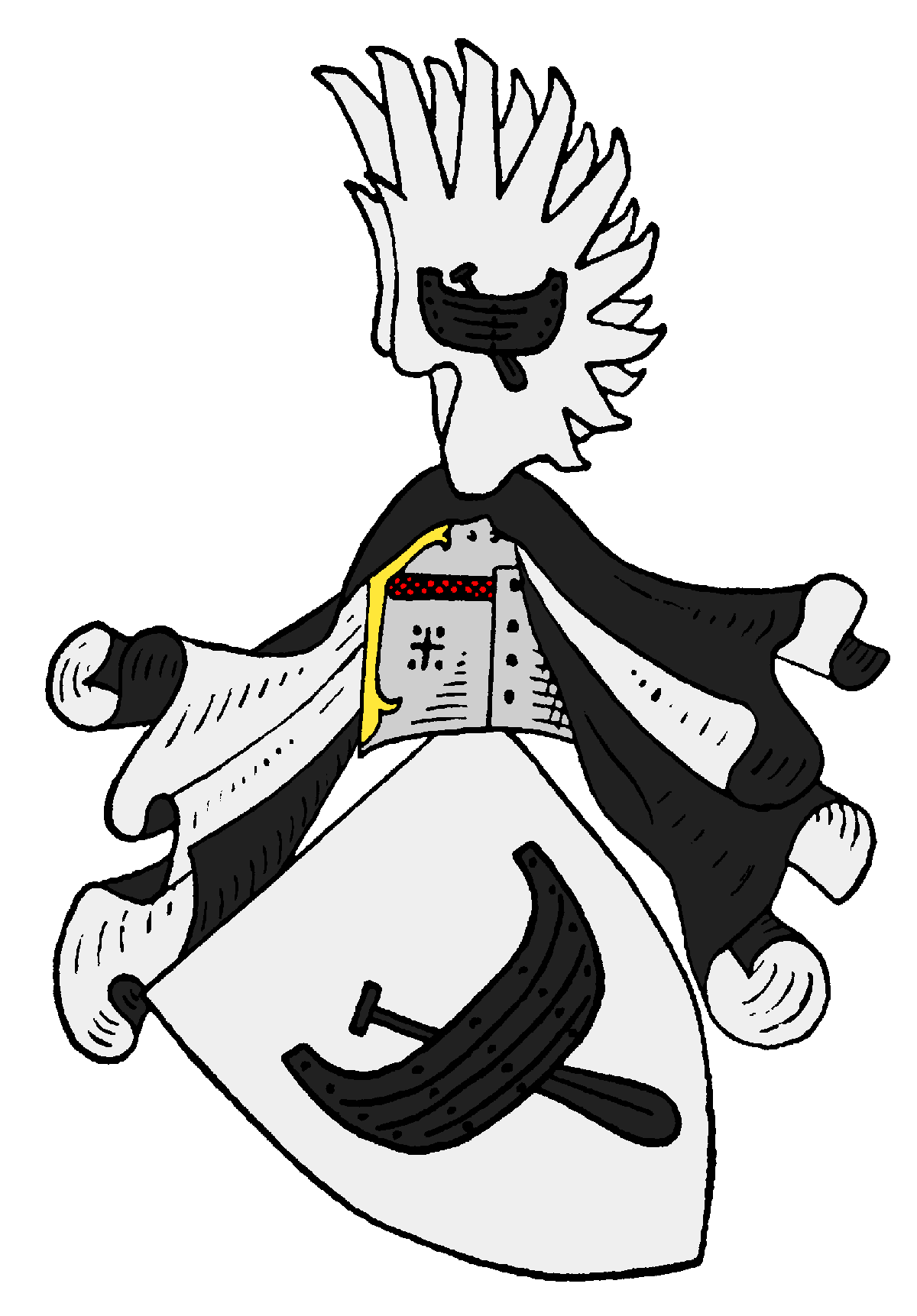
Coat of arms of the Lords of Thannhausen

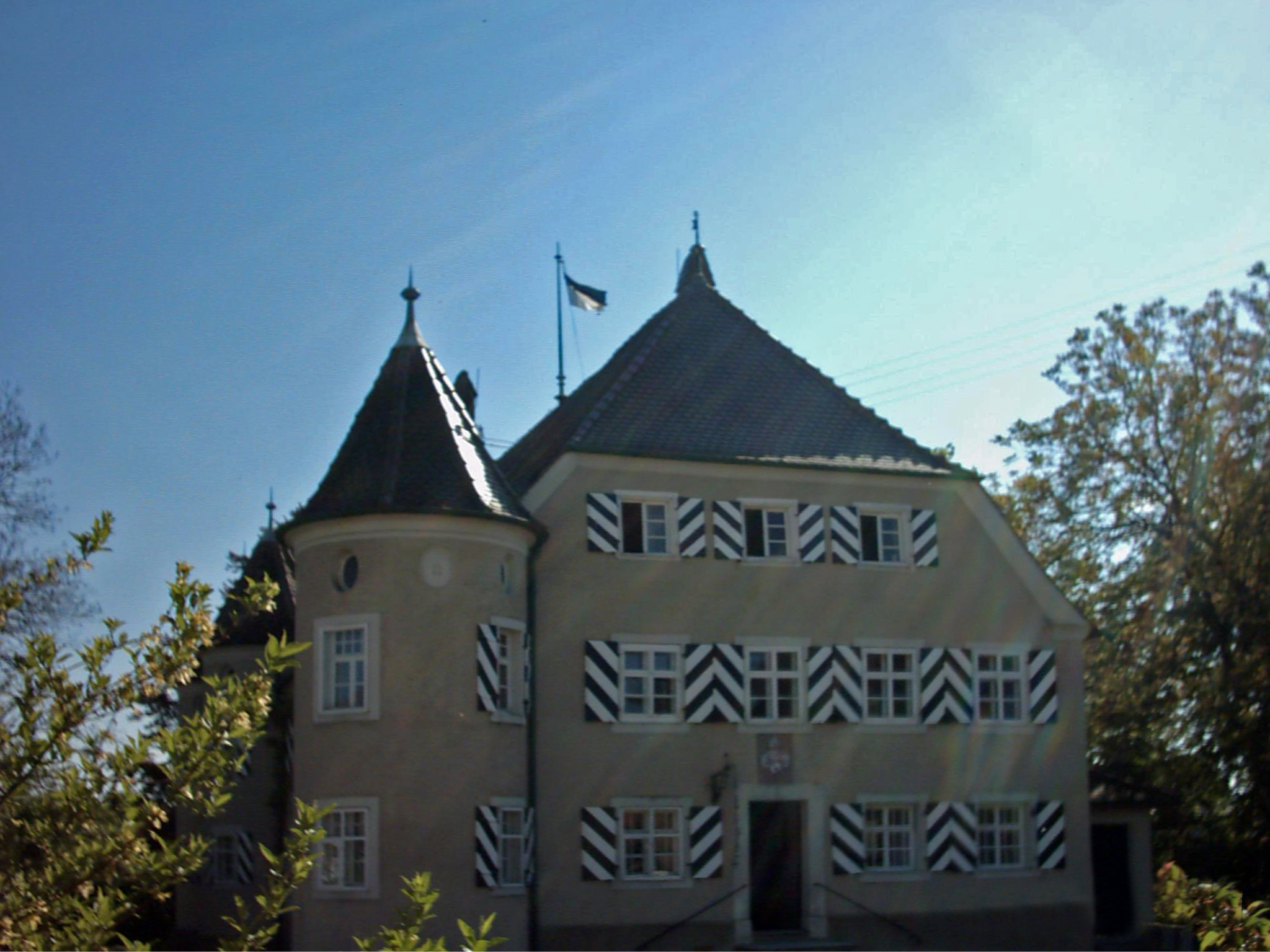
Tannhausen Castle, Ostalbkreis, Baden-Württemberg

The House of Thannhausen (also found as von Thannhausen, von und zu Thannhausen, and Thannhauser) are a still existing uradel lineage with the rank of Freiherr (Baron). They achieved the status of Imperial Knights while a distinct Styrian branch of the lineage obtained the rank of graf (count) and resided at Thannhausen Castle (Styria) in the 17th century. Their name Thannhausen or Thannhauser derives from the ownership of the Hofmark Thanhausen documented since the 12th century. Their ancestral seat is in the Swabian municipality of Tannhausen near Ellwangen.

== History ==
During the Carolingian dynasty, the family's Frankish ancestors settled the Nördlinger Ries area in northeastern Alamannia. Their residence Tannhausen (not to be confused with Thannhausen near Günzburg or Thannhausen, Styria) was first mentioned in an 1100 deed. In the Duchy of Swabia, the Thannhausens held large estates and important offices, as documented under the rule of the Hohenstaufen duke Frederick II in 1112 and 1115.

Following the writings of Felix Fabri (1438/39–1502), it is also assumed that the medieval minnesinger and poet Tannhäuser (d. after 1265) was an offspring of this family. He may be identical with Lupoldus Danhäuser who is said to be the brother or son of one of the earliest known ancestors Sigiboto De Tanhusen: they are both mentioned in a 1246 deed issued by the Franconian counts of Hohenlohe.

Family members were also entrusted with public offices in the modern era: in 1552, William of Thannhausen (1518–1596) is documented as a cavalry captain (Hauptmann) in the service of the Hohenzollern margraves of Ansbach, succeeded by his son Hans-Wolf (1555–1635) during the Thirty Years' War. From the 13th century until 1849, members of this family served for generations as hereditary ministeriales of the House of Oettingen-Wallerstein. After that, they served the Kings of Württemberg as officers or in forestry, as well as the Princes of Hohenzollern-Sigmaringen and the Franconian Bishops of Würzburg. The brothers Frederick and Maximilian of Thannhausen were commanders in the French Grande Armée and were killed in the Napoleonic Wars.

Over the centuries, the family seat was exposed to wars and fires; it burned down in 1567, 1621, and 1649. The castle's current appearance dates from 1767.
