= Hürben =

There are places that have the name Hürben:

== In Germany ==
- Hürben (Krumbach), a former village which in 1902 became part of Krumbach, in the Günzburg district, Bavaria
- A borough of Giengen an der Brenz, in the Heidenheim district, Baden-Württemberg
