= Woman Ironing (Wouters) =

Painting by Rik Wouters

- De strijkster (Flemish)
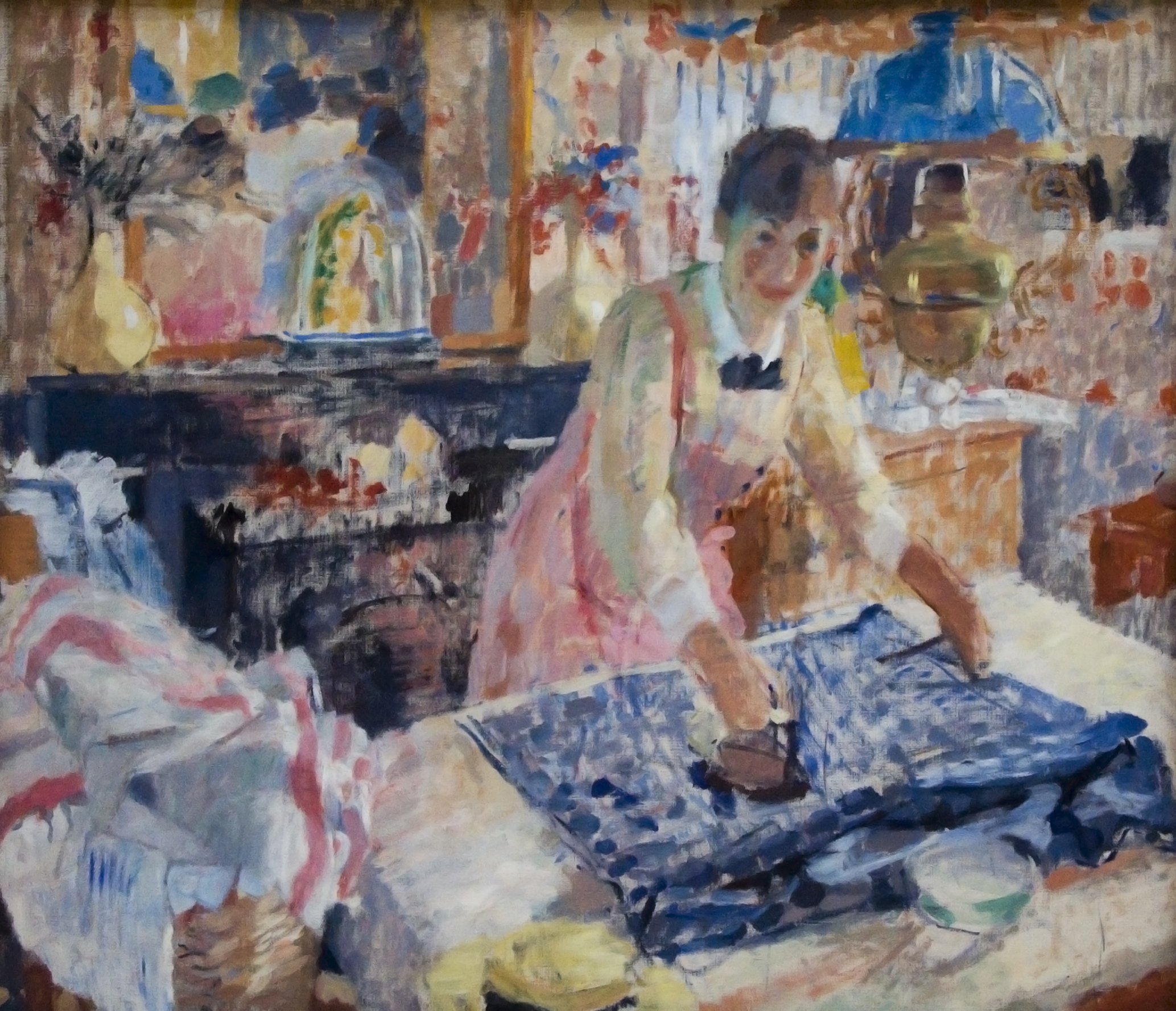
- Artist: Rik Wouters
- Year: 1912
- Dimensions: 108.5 cm × 124.8 cm (42.7 in × 49.1 in)
- Location: Royal Museum of Fine Arts Antwerp; Antwerp

Woman Ironing (Flemish: De strijkster) is a painting by Rik Wouters in the Royal Museum of Fine Arts Antwerp (Dutch: Koninklijk Museum voor Schone Kunsten Antwerpen). It is one of many scenes from daily life from which the painter found inspiration and took as a subject. His wife, muse and favourite model was Hélène Duerinckx (Nel).

The picture shows a woman in a comfortable domestic setting bending over a table ironing a blue garment. She wears a pink dress over a white shirt and is looking up from her work at the viewer.

== Style ==
The colours in the work are strong; the brushwork is loose and expressive. In style it has links to Impressionism, Fauvism and Expressionism and all these approaches have been referenced in regard to this work. In 1912, the time of this painting, Wouters had been staying in Paris, where he discovered the colours of Cézanne and Matisse, Monet's landscapes, and Renoir's women. His own palette became brighter and more vibrant; its intensity and the turbulence of the surface recalling Fauvism. In the same year, he also travelled to Cologne and Düsseldorf where he admired the works of Van Gogh and German Expressionism.

== Subject and precedents ==
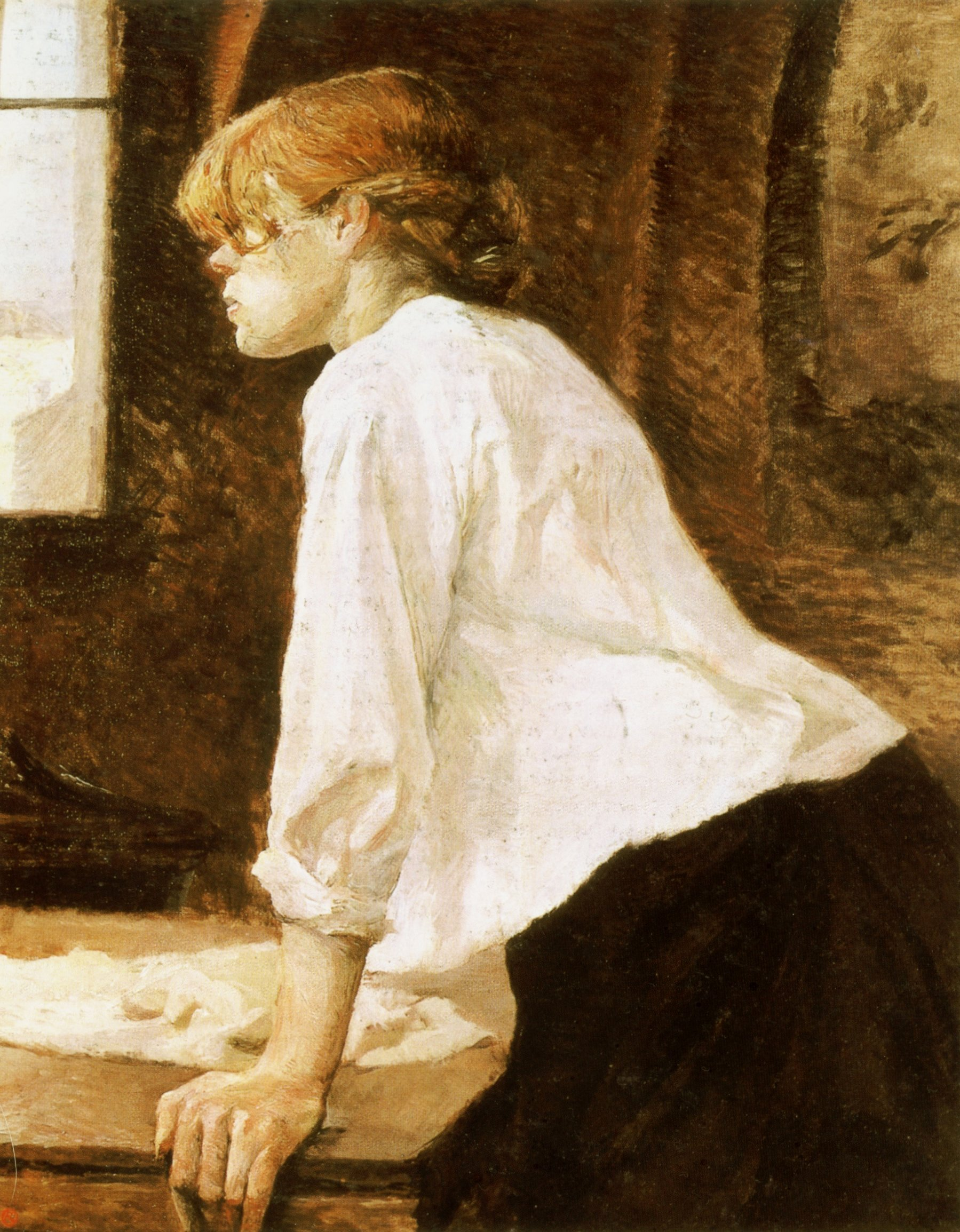
La Blanchisseuse (1884-1888) by Henri de Toulouse-Lautrec

The subject of laundresses and washerwomen attracted the French Impressionist painters who had begun to take an interest in the working lives of ordinary people. Both contemporary social concerns as well as themes of industrial modernity had informed such works in the decades preceding Wouter's The Ironer.

Among painters who produced notable works on this theme were Edgar Degas, Henri de Toulouse-Lautrec, and Berthe Morisot. Morisot had done Hanging the Laundry out to Dry in 1875 and The Farmer Hanging Laundry. The former uses softer pinks and blues than Wouter's, and the latter has a pale, subtle palette in contrast to Wouter's vibrant one.

Washerwomen had become one of Degas's favourite subjects between 1869 and 1895. His Repasseuses, the third of a series of four, shows one woman yawning and another leaning heavily on her iron.

Compared with Wouter's Ironer, the French artists' laundresses are shown in a more commercial/industrial context.

George Washington Lambert had also produced The Laundresses about 1901 as well as La Blanchisseuse (The French Landlady) in the same year but without the expressive use of colour. The latter in particular was a formal group composition concerned with unity of effect in tones of black and white. In 1904, Pablo Picasso also painted the figure of a single Woman Ironing, in neutral tones of blue and gray. Whereas Wouter's is bright in mood and colour, in Picasso's the mood is melancholy. In the same year as De strijkster, Australian Vida Lahey produced a narrative painting of the domestic weekly washing routine which at the time, was normally done on Mondays. It showed the physicality of the work. She gave it the title ''Monday morning".
