= Siegfried Rosengart =

Art dealer (1894–1985)

Siegfried Rosengart (1894 – 1985) was a German-Swiss art dealer.

== Early life ==
Rosengart was born in 1894. His parents were Heinrich Rosengart (1850–1921), a bed feather maker, and Selma Thannhauser. His uncles, Joseph Rosengart and Heinrich Thannhauser, were both involved in art.

In 1912 Rosengart was influenced by a visit to the Sonderbund exhibition in Cologne in 1912, which featured modern art. He met Pablo Picasso while studying French in Paris in 1913–14. In 1919, Rosengart joined his uncle Heinrich Thannhauser's gallery. Rosengart opened a branch for Thannhauser in Lucerne in 1920, managing it until 1937. In 1933 he received Swiss citizenship.

== Art dealing and collecting ==
Rosengart's daughter, Angela, joined him in running the gallery in 1948, becoming a partner in 1957.

Rosengart sold artworks to museums, such as the Kunstsammlung Nordrhein-Westfalen (North Rhine-Westphalia Art Collection) in Düsseldorf, as well as to private collectors, including Etta and Claribel Cone and Samuel Courtauld. He dealt frequently in works by Paul Klee. He also acted as an advisor and intermediary for art collectors Bernhard Sprengel (1899–1985) and Peter Ludwig (1925–96).

Rosengart also collected art for his own private collection.

In 1971, he and his daughter Angela donated a Picasso painting to the Kunsthaus Zürich in 1971. In 1978, with eight artworks, they created a small Picasso museum for the city of Lucerne. They added about 200 photographs of Picasso by David Douglas Duncan to the museum in 1992.

== Legacy ==
Rosengart died in 1985. Since then, his daughter Angela has continued to run the gallery. In 1992 she established a charitable foundation to preserve and exhibit the Rosengart collection. In March 2002, the gallery opened in the former building of the Swiss National Bank in Lucerne. The core of the collection consists of 47 paintings and drawings by Picasso from between 1904 and 1972, as well as 125 selected Klee works from all of his creative periods. The latter is one of the most important private Klee collections internationally. The gallery also includes three paintings by Paul Cézanne, as well as paintings by Claude Monet, Camille Pissarro, Pierre-Auguste Renoir, Georges Seurat, the Nabis artists Pierre Bonnard and Éduoard Vuillard, and works by Amedeo Modigliani, Chaïm Soutine, Henri Matisse, Georges Braque, Fernand Léger, Wassily Kandinsky, Joan Miró and Marc Chagall.
