= Heinrich Thannhauser =

German art dealer

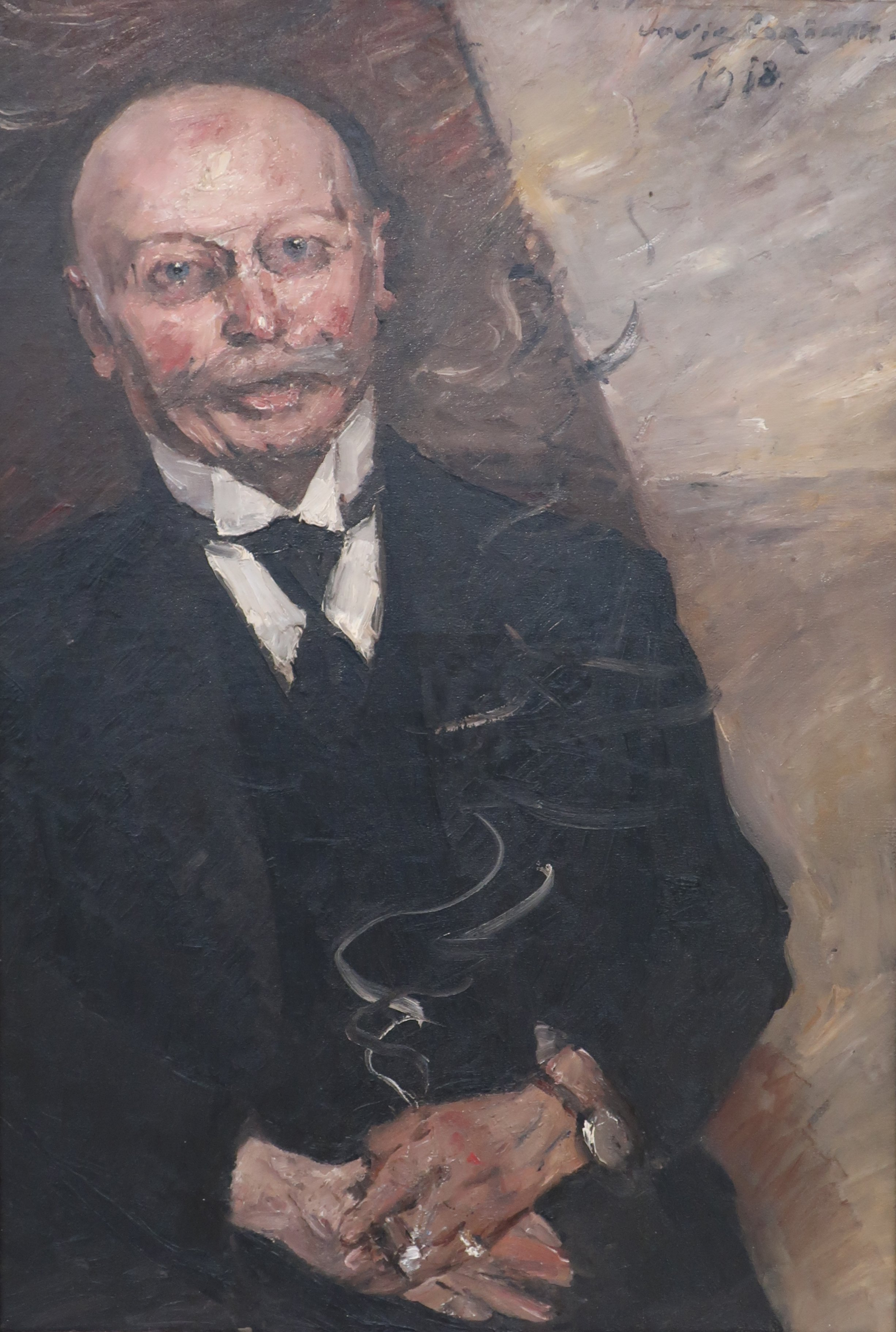
- Thannhauser portrayed by Lovis Corinth
- Born: Heinrich Thannhauser; 16 February 1859; Hürben, German Empire
- Died: 24 November 1934 (aged 75); Lucerne, Switzerland
- Occupations: Art dealer, art collector, patron
- Partner: Charlotte Nachtigall (m. 1891; died 1910)
- Children: Justin

Heinrich Thannhauser (16 February 1859 – 24 November 1935) was a German art dealer and collector who was amongst the most important patrons of expressionism in Germany. He was the father of Justin Thannhauser.

== Early life and education ==
Thannhauser was born 16 February 1859 in Hürben (presently Krumbach), the third of six children, to Jonas Thannhauser (1833–1890), a sawn goods merchant, and Michle "Mina" Thannhauser.

== Art career ==
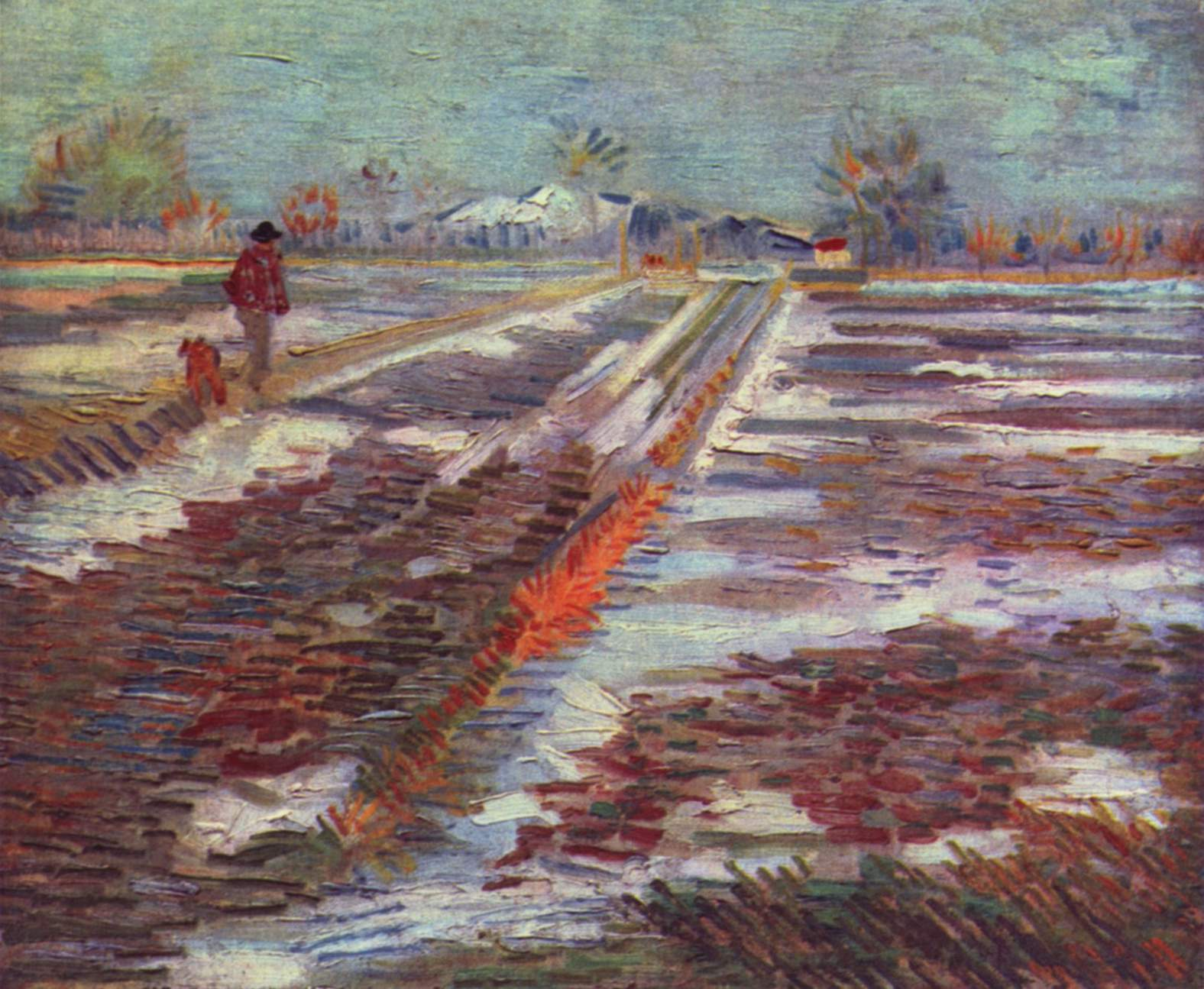
Vincent van Gogh: Hügel bei Saint-Rémy (1888) from the collection of J. K. Thannhauser

He founded his Munich Modern Gallery (Moderne Galerie)in 1904. At first he exhibited the artworks of French Impressionists such as Édouard Manet, Edgar Degas and Paul Gauguin. Later works by Pablo Picasso and Georges Braque were added.

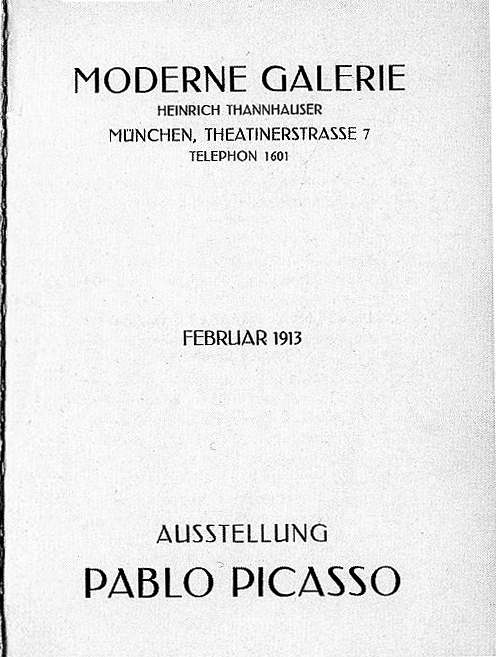
Catalog Picasso exhibition 1913

In 1909, Thannhauser separated from his partner Franz Josef Brakl and continued to run the gallery under the name Galerie Thannhauser. The first exhibition of the Neue Künstlervereinigung München took place in the Arco-Palais in the same year. In 1911 he began collaborating with Der Blaue Reiter. In 1918 he had himself painted in Berlin simultaneously by Lovis Corinth and by Max Liebermann; the one he sat for a portrait in the morning, the other in the afternoon.

In 1920 his nephew Siegfried Rosengart opened a branch of the gallery in Lucerne.

In 1934 fleeing from the Nazis to Switzerland, Thannhauser had a stroke at the border; he died on 24 November 1935 in Lucerne, Switzerland aged 76.

== Personal life ==
On 26 May 1891, Thannhauser married Charlotte Nachtigall, originally of Nuremberg, at Heidingsfeld (presently a part of Wurzburg). They had one son;

- Justin Karl Thannhauser (1892–1976), who became one of the most important European art dealers, married firstly to Käthe "Kate" Levi (1894–1960) with whom he had two sons, secondly to Hilde Breitwisch (1919–1991). All the European holdings were lost by confiscation of the Nazis. In 1941, he was able to flee to the United States, where he settled in New York City and continued in the art business.

== Literature ==
- Mario-Andreas von Lüttichau: Die Moderne Galerie Heinrich Thannhauser in München. In: Henrike Junge (Hrsg.): Avantgarde und Publikum: Zur Rezeption avantgardistischer Kunst in Deutschland 1905–1933. Böhlau, Köln, Weimar, Wien 1992.
- Thannhauser. Händler, Sammler, Stifter. Hrsg. v. Zentralarchiv des internationalen Kunsthandels e. V. ZADIK und SK Stiftung Kultur der Sparkasse KölnBonn. Sediment – Mitteilungen zur Geschichte des Kunsthandels, 11. Verlag für Moderne Kunst, Nürnberg 2006
- Emily D. Bilski: Die „Moderne Galerie“ von Heinrich Thannhauser / The „Moderne Galerie“ of Heinrich Thannhauser. Sammelbilder / Collecting Images, 6. Minerva, München 2008. (Zur gleichnamigen Ausstellung. Jüdisches Museum München, 30. Januar 2008 – 25. Mai 2008.)

== See also ==
- Thannhauser Galleries
- Max G. Bollag
- Justin Thannhauser
