= Justin Thannhauser =

German art dealer (1892–1976)

Justin K. Thannhauser
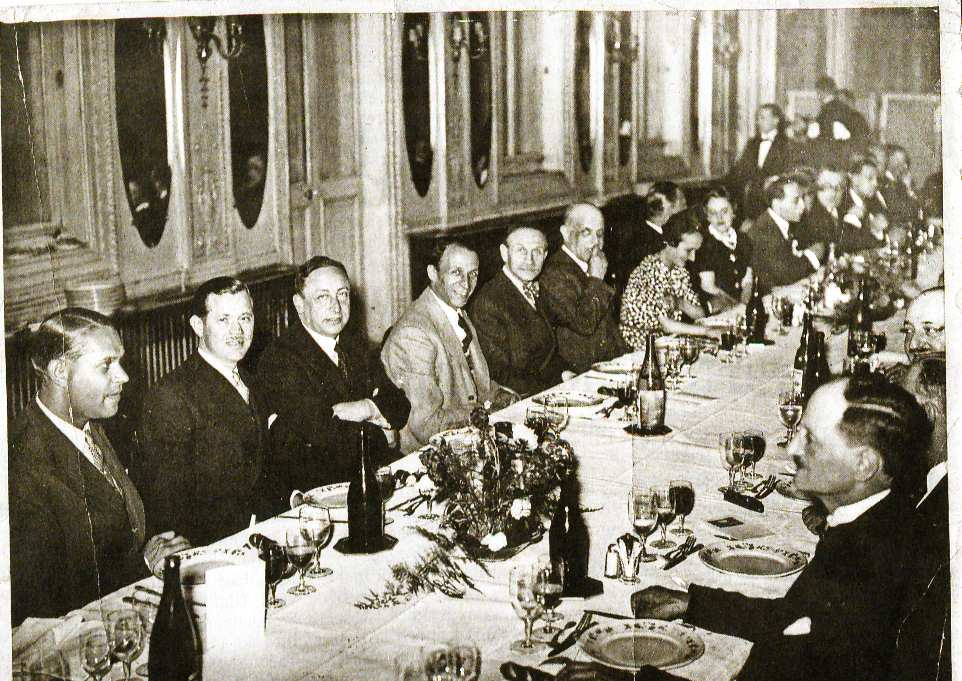
- Justin Thannhauser (third from the left, with crossed arms) sitting next to Pierre Loeb in 1938 at a gathering of the Syndicat des Éditeurs d’Art et Négociants en Tableaux Modernes
- Born: Justin Kurt Thannhauser; 7 May 1894; Munich, German Empire
- Died: 26 December 1976 (aged 82); Gstaad, Switzerland
- Occupations: Art dealer, art collector, patron
- Spouses: Käthe Levi (m. 1917; died 1960) Hildegard Breitwisch (m. 1960)
- Children: 2
- Father: Heinrich Thannhauser

Justin K. Thannhauser (7 May 1892 – 26 December 1976) was a German art dealer and collector who was an important figure in the development and dissemination of modern art in Europe.

== Biography ==
=== Early years ===
Justin K. Thannhauser was born in Munich, the son of Charlotte (Nachtigall) and Heinrich Thannhauser (1859–1935), who was also an art dealer. He was born into a German Jewish family;

As a child, Justin assisted his father in his Moderne Galerie, one of the three Thannhauser Galleries, which was located in Munich. In 1911, Heinrich sent him abroad to further his academic studies, including art history, philosophy, and psychology. Justin studied in Munich, Berlin, Florence, and Paris, with renowned scholars such as Henri Bergson, Adolf Goldschmidt, and Heinrich Wölfflin. He later brought Wölfflin and other eminent guests to hold private lectures at the Moderne Galerie, helping to turn it into one of Munich's leading art galleries. While abroad, he also strengthened business contacts with artists and other important art dealers, such as Daniel-Henry Kahnweiler (Pablo Picasso's Parisian dealer) and Wilhelm Uhde.

In 1912, Justin returned to Munich to work full-time at the gallery, which had become known for its combination of Munich Modernism (see Neue Künstlervereinigung München and Der Blaue Reiter) and French avant-garde painting (see Impressionism and Post-Impressionism). His new business relationship with Filippo Tommaso Marinetti, however, led to an unprecedented exhibition of works by the Italian Futurists. This exhibition, while controversial, brought even greater notoriety to the gallery. In 1913, it held the largest and most comprehensive exhibition of Picasso's work. Justin wrote the introduction to the exhibition catalogue and soon began a close personal and professional relationship with the artist. He acquired many of Picasso's works over the years, including Woman Ironing (1904) and The Blind Man's Meal (1903).

=== World War I and the interwar period ===
Justin was called to serve in World War I in 1914. After being wounded in 1916, he returned to Munich and helped Heinrich to publish three large volumes cataloguing a selection of the gallery's inventory and activities. In 1918, he married his first wife, Kate. She gave birth to their two sons, Heinz and Michel, in 1918 and 1920, respectively. In 1919, as the political and economic situation in Germany continued to decline, Justin decided to move his family to Lucerne, Switzerland. There, he opened a second branch of what was now called Moderne Galerie/Thannhauser. This new venue allowed the family to sell works that were found unfavorable in Germany. Justin ran the Lucerne branch until 1921, when he was called back to Munich to assist his father, who had developed a serious condition in his larynx. The Lucerne gallery continued to be under Justin's direction until 1928, when his cousin Siegfried Rosengart assumed control and changed its name to Galerie Rosengart.

Once in Munich, Justin assumed complete control of his father's gallery and brought the two branches under the name Galerien Thannhauser. He began to slowly rebuild the business's reputation, which had weakened during the war, by organizing conservative exhibitions of German paintings and works on paper. He soon returned to the avant-garde, however, showing works by Picasso and Kandinsky in 1922, an exhibition of contemporary American artists in 1923, and paintings by Vlaminck in 1925. His most daring endeavors took place in 1926, when he held exhibitions of work by George Grosz and Otto Dix.

In 1927, Justin opened a third gallery in Berlin. The success of this branch quickly surpassed that of the one in Munich; he thus decided to focus completely on the former and closed the latter in 1928. His greatest achievement in the Berlin space took place in 1930, when he presented the largest exhibition of works by Matisse ever held in Germany.

=== World War II and post-war years ===
In 1937, Justin moved with this family to Paris to escape the Nazi Germany regime. Although the Nazi government considered Modern art to be "degenerate," he had paid a steep export tax and was thus permitted to bring many important works and archive materials with him. He was, however, forced to liquidate his family's collection of classic German art in order to make this financially possible. Despite this considerable loss, he was able to open a private gallery on rue de Miromesnil. He was also voted into the Syndicat des Editeurs d'Art et Négotiants en Tableaux Modernes, Paris's professional society of art dealers.

After the outbreak of World War II, Justin moved his family back to Switzerland, and then to New York. There, he opened another private gallery. Fortunately, he had managed to bring several important works with him to the United States; the house in Paris would later be looted by Nazi soldiers. However, due to the death of Heinz (who was killed in combat in 1944) and the poor health of Michel (who would ultimately die in 1952), Justin canceled his plans to open a public gallery and placed a large number of works up for auction in 1945. He remained in New York until 1971, where he continued to operate the private gallery, collected art, and assisted museums and galleries with exhibitions and acquisitions. He also hosted many international cultural luminaries in his home, including Picasso, Louise Bourgeois, Henri Cartier-Bresson, Marcel Duchamp, Jean Renoir, John D. Rockefeller, and Thomas M. Messer, then Director of the Solomon R. Guggenheim Museum, among many others. Kate died in 1960, and he married his second wife, Hilde, two years later.

In 1963, Justin decided to bequeath the essential works of his collection to the Guggenheim. The size and quality of this gift was unparalleled by any that he had made or would make again. Because the terms called for the works to be permanently installed in a designated space so that they would be publicly accessible, the Guggenheim created the Thannhauser Wing in 1965. The museum space housing the Thannhauser collection has since been expanded and restored.

Justin and Hilde retired to Switzerland in 1971, and Justin died in Gstaad on December 26, 1976. After his death, Hilde continued to donate works of art to institutions around the world, including the Kunstmuseum Bern and the Guggenheim. She died in Bern in 1991.

== Controversies and lawsuits concerning Holocaust-related art transactions ==
Thannhauser was involved in art transactions that have resulted in Nazi-era art claims against the Guggenheim Museum, the National Gallery of Art, the Andrew Lloyd Webber Art Foundation, the Bavarian State Paintings Collections, and Chicago art collectors James and Marilynn Alsdorf, among others. In each case, the lawsuits were filed in courts by the families of the Jewish collectors who had owned the artworks before Thannhauser dealt with them.

In 2003, the heirs of Carlotta Landsberg filed a lawsuit for the return of Picasso's Woman in White (Femme en Blanc), which had been placed in safekeeping with Thannhauser when they fled the Nazis.

In 2007, the heirs of Berlin banker Paul von Mendelssohn-Bartholdy requested the restitution of the Picasso oil painting "Le Moulin de la Galette", which Thannhauser had given to the Guggenheim. The lawsuit was settled in a secret agreement between the museum and the heirs. The Mendelssohn-Barthody heirs also filed a lawsuit for the return of Picasso's Madame Soler.

In January 2023, a claim was filed in the Manhattan Supreme Court against the Guggenheim Museum by the heirs of Karl Adler and Rosi Jacobi demanding the repatriation of Picasso's Woman Ironing. Thannhauser had purchased the painting in 1938, during the Nazi era. When he died in 1978, he gave it, along with the rest of his artworks, to the Guggenheim Museum. The Guggenheim Museum's position concerning Picasso's "Woman Ironing" is that when the painting's owner sold it, he made a “fair transaction.” However, the heirs claim that it was sold under duress.

Also in 2023, the heirs of Hedwig Stern filed a restitution claim for Vincent Van Gogh's Olive Picking against the Basil & Elise Goulandris Foundation in Athens and the Metropolitan Museum of Art in New York. Thannhauser had sold Olive Picking to Vincent Astor in 1948.

== Personal life ==
In 1917, Thannhauser married firstly to Käthe Levi (1894–1960), with whom he had three sons;

- Heinz "Henry" Thannhauser (1918–1944), who attended Buxton College in Derbyshire, England in the 1930s and later emigrated to the U.S. where he attended Harvard College, became a naturalized U.S. citizen and served as sergeant in the United States Air Force. He died 15 August 1944 in an airplane crash.
- Michel Thannhauser (1920–1952), who also emigrated to the U.S., committed suicide while living in Rhinebeck, New York.

Since none of his sons were married or had children, his line became extinct with his passing. In 1960, aged 68, he married secondly to Hildegard "Hilde" Breitwisch (1919–1991), while residing in Paris, France. They retired to Switzerland in 1971.

Thannhauser died 26 December 1976 at his chalet in Gstaad, Switzerland aged 84.

== See also ==
- Thannhauser Galleries
