= Rosengart Collection Museum =

Art museum in Lucerne, Switzerland

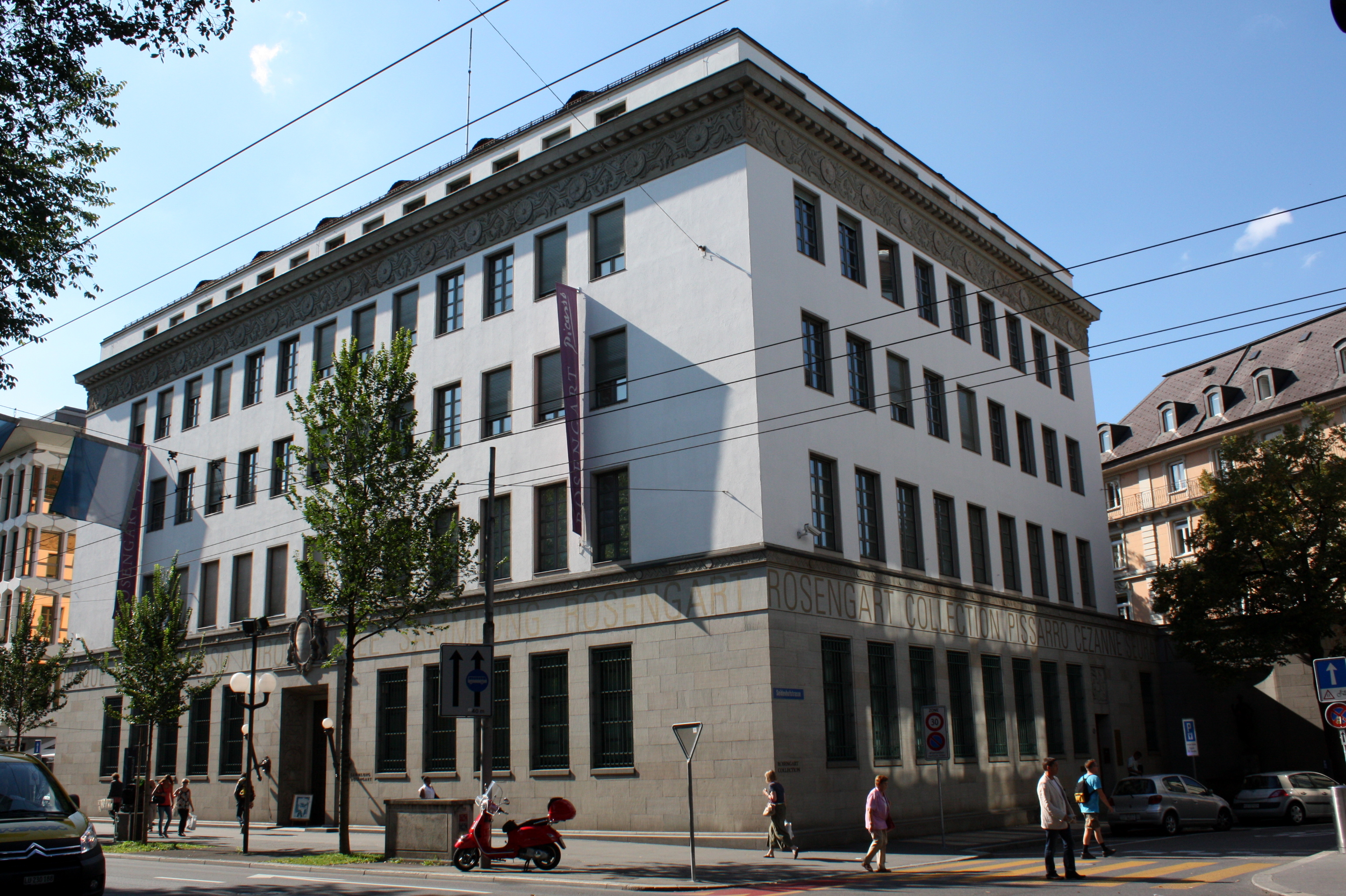
- Interactive fullscreen map
- Established: 2002
- Location: Lucerne, Switzerland
- Coordinates: 47.0497°N 8.3073°E
- Type: Modern art

The Rosengart Collection Museum (Museum Sammlung Rosengart) is an art museum located in Lucerne, Switzerland. It houses a collection of modern art based on two main artists: Paul Klee and Pablo Picasso.

== Collection ==
The art dealer Siegfried Rosengart (1894-1985), who worked in Munich with his uncle Heinrich Thannhauser before moving to Lucerne, had contacts with Picasso and Marc Chagall. With his daughter, Angela, he built a modern art collection containing works by Vassily Kandinsky, Georges Braque, Chaïm Soutine, Amedeo Modigliani, Fernand Léger, Georges Seurat, Pierre Bonnard, Édouard Vuillard, Paul Cézanne and Claude Monet, as well as Camille Pissarro, Auguste Renoir, Maurice Utrillo, Georges Rouault, Henri Matisse and Joan Miró.

The Rosengarts' Klee collection is the largest in private hands after that of the artist's family. Some of their Picassos were exhibited at the musée Picasso de Lucerne opened in 1978 by the Rosengarts, to celebrate the 800th anniversary of the city.

Angela Rosengart founded the Fondation Rosengart in 1992. The Rosengart Collection opened in March 2002 and received more than 100,000 visitors in the following twelve months.

== Building ==
The Rosengarts purchased a neoclassical building formerly belonging to the Swiss National Bank, which was built in 1923-1924 by the Zurich architect Hermann Herter, and entrusted its conversion to the architect Roger Diener. The art museum opened on 26 March 2002.

The ground floor shows works by Picasso, the basement those by Klee, and the first floor various other artists. The former bank's conference room is preserved in its original state and open to visitors.

== See also ==
- List of museums in Switzerland
