= Woman Ironing =

1904 painting by Pablo Picasso

Woman Ironing (La repasseuse)
- Artist: Pablo Picasso
- Year: Paris, 1904
- Medium: Oil on canvas
- Dimensions: 116.2 cm × 73 cm (45 3/4 in × 28 3/4 in)
- Location: Solomon R. Guggenheim Museum, New York
- Owner: Solomon R. Guggenheim Museum, New York; Thannhauser Collection, Gift, Justin Thannhauser, 1978

Woman Ironing (French: La repasseuse) is a 1904 oil painting by Pablo Picasso that was completed during the artist's Blue Period (1901—1904). This evocative image, painted in neutral tones of blue and gray, depicts an emaciated woman with hollowed eyes, sunken cheeks, and bent form, as she presses down on an iron with all her will. A recurrent subject matter for Picasso during this time is the desolation of social outsiders. This painting, as the rest of his works of the Blue Period, is inspired by his life in Spain but was painted in Paris.

When Picasso painted Woman Ironing, he was roughly 22 years old. Living in Paris, with little money, he would often start a painting on a canvas, abandon it, and later use the same surface to paint over a new work. Since 1989, when an infrared camera was used to examine Woman Ironing, art historians and conservators have been aware of the existence of another portrait beneath it. The work is part of the Thannhauser Collection currently on display in the Thannhauser Gallery of the Solomon R. Guggenheim Museum in New York.

== Background ==
Picasso's artistic training began as a youth in Spain where traditions of realism, including academic classicism and Spanish genre, influenced him in various degrees. His devotion to the Catalan modernism movement in Barcelona, as well as his encounter with Post-Impressionist and Symbolist painting in Paris, had an important, although brief, impact on his oeuvre. During his Blue Period years between 1901 and 1904, Picasso moved back and forth between France and Spain.

Woman Ironing was painted during a phase in his work that he developed once he settled in Paris in 1904. He was living in Le Bateau-Lavoir building in Montmartre at 13 Rue Ravignan along with many other artists.

=== The studio ===
During his Blue Period years, Picasso's group of friends widened, and he became particularly close with poets Guillaume Apollinaire (1880—1918) and André Salmon (1881—1969). Salmon's recollection of his first visit to Picasso's studio provides us with glimpses of the artist's way of working:

A petrol lamp was burning on a table carved in bourgeois taste with Second Empire moldings, which [Picasso] had bought at a junk shop. there was no question of electricity or even gas at 13 [Rue Ravignan]. The petrol lamp gave out little light. In order to paint and to display his canvases, a candle was necessary—that guttering candle which Picasso held up high in front of me when he gave me a human introduction to the superhuman world of these starving people, these and mothers with no milk, the superreal world of bleue Misère.

— André Salmon, Souvenirs sans fin,1955.170

Regardless of the lack of gas or electricity, Picasso favored working at night. Before 1909, most of his paintings were done under the light of an oil lamp, hung above his head while he squatted on the floor in front of his canvas. When he could not afford to buy the oil, which was quite often, he held a candle with one hand while working with the other.

== Provenance and claim for restitution ==
Ambroise Vollard, Paris; Der Neuer Kunstsalon, Munich; Moderne Galerie Heinrich Thannhauser, Munich, ca. 1913; Karl Adler, Berlin and Amsterdam, 1916; purchased from Adler by Justin Thannhauser, 1937.

Woman Ironing dates from 1904, the year when Picasso had permanently moved to Paris after visiting the city several times. Picasso's relationship with Ambroise Vollard (1866—1939), the first owner of the painting, began in 1901 when at the age of nineteen, Picasso approached the already established Parisian art dealer. In 1901, Vollard gave Picasso his first show in Paris. It was not a great success in Vollard's eyes as many of the works sold at low prices. The dealer refused to buy the unsold pieces, and it was not until the artist's reputation grew that Vollard made several important purchases. Their relationship lasted until 1939, and Vollard never offered Picasso a secure contract.

Justin Thannhauser (1892—1976), the last owner of the painting before he bequeathed it to the Solomon R. Guggenheim Museum, was a critical figure to the advancement of modern art in Europe. Justin assisted his father Heinrich Thannhauser in managing the distinguished Moderne Galerie, established in Munich in 1909. In 1913, the gallery mounted the first major Picasso retrospective, which included Woman Ironing. The paintings and sculptures bequeathed by Justin Thannhauser to the Solomon R. Guggenheim Museum in 1963 were on loan to the museum before permanently entering the collection in 1978, two years after Thannhauser's death.

In 2023 the heirs of Karl and Rosie Adler filed a lawsuit against the Solomon R. Guggenheim museum to claim the restitution of the painting which they said the Adlers were forced to sell in 1938 due to Nazi persecution.

== Analysis ==
By using color and form to evoke notions about the subject of the work, Picasso depicts the laundress in neutral tones and in a tense, angular manner, expressing poverty, loneliness, and suffering. Picasso decontextualizes the woman by removing her from a specific place and time and keeps her anonymous, using her tired female body, hardened by challenge and labor, to generalize human tragedy. These generalizations, visible in his Blue Period and Rose Period works, are testament of Picasso's preoccupation with the universal, more than with particular human events and emotions, including his own. Picasso deals with the laundress' occupation as a universal symbol. The theme is not only one of social compassion, but one hinting at the circumstances of an urban proletariat, which is larger than the reality of a single laundress.

Picasso is not the first to explore the theme of labor. During the late 19th and early 20th century, works such as Gustave Courbet's The Stonebreakers (1849) and Jean-Fraçois Millet's The Gleaners (1857) depicted the hardships of workers, bringing their untold stories to the forefront. Daumier, Degas, and Picasso himself in 1901 had previously explored the subject of the laundress. The expressive pose in Picasso's 1904's Woman Ironing, was certainly inspired by Degas's Woman Ironing (ca. 1884—1886). Curiously, the same pose appears in The Blue Room, a 1901 Picasso painting. Idealized workers—portrayed as simple, strong souls that symbolized purity and virtue— were a large focus of Picasso's Blue Period.

While these social, economic, and political complexities formed Picasso's sympathies, perceptions, and expressions, many scholars argue that his apparent interest is less ideological than dramatic. One can quickly draw the link between the representation of the underclass depicted in his canvases with Social Realism—a movement that criticized social structures maintaining the miserable conditions of the working class and the poor. But Picasso's relationship with his characters is a fictitious one, with little if any, Social Realism informing his vision of underclass life.

1904 was a transitional year between Blue and Rose periods. Picasso successfully attempts to reduce the heaviness found in sculptural figures painted in dark-valued monochromatic hues, by lightening color and elongating form. These developments point to his Rose period, during which he consciously works on the elegance of the figures.

Woman Ironing encompasses some of these developments. His art relaxes, the figure elongates, as well as becoming more artificial in gesture, with more angular extremities. Soft shades of pinks, blues, and browns reintroduce color to the canvas. The drawing becomes looser, and the pigments are applied more openly, in a wash-like form. While the woman is carefully outlined, the drawing becomes more fluid; this is particularly noticeable in the linear patterns of the hair.

The model that Picasso uses for Woman Ironing has been identified as the daughter of Frédé, the owner of the café Le Lapin Agile, frequented by Picasso and his friends. Her name is Margot, and she appears in his other canvases from 1904.

== Imaging and discoveries ==
In 1989, a study of Woman Ironing revealed an apparent portrait of a man underneath the surface of the 1904 work of art. This is not the only Picasso painting with a hidden image underneath its surface. For example, when asked to discuss Seated Woman and Child, more than fifty years after its completion in 1901, it is reported that Picasso replied with a "touch of regret," mentioning a lost work that lay beneath it. "Maybe one could still see it if one radiographed the painting," he suggested.

Early in his career financial constraints were certainly part of his motivations for reusing canvases. Even though an artist has the option of scraping off an earlier work, or covering an old image with an even coat of ground to prepare the surface for the new painting, Picasso did this very rarely. Instead, he reworked his paintings directly over earlier images without eliminating the previous attempt.

Conservators and researchers can generally recognize anomalies in a painting by observing variation on its surface with the naked eye. To confirm that these variations are the product of an earlier image, a number of technical means to look beneath the visible image can be used. X-rays and infrared light can penetrate the layers of a painting to reveal paint changes and an artist's reworking that are normally hidden from view.

The infrared camera posed technological limitations that prevented further discoveries until recently. The need to revise the original restoration of the work conducted in the 1950s, as well as earlier imaging process and findings, led to an in-depth technical-scientific study of Woman Ironing. Two types of infrared cameras, hyperspectral and multispectral, were used for the recent studies.

Even though the current methods allowed for a better view of the brushwork and contours of the man's portrait beneath Woman Ironing, the resulting new infrared images do not provide accurate details of its painting palette. Up to now, microscopic analysis revealed that the true colors of the male portrait include rosy flesh tones and a bright red necktie. The outcome images of x-radiography are superior to those of infrared in areas of the composition containing white lead paint, therefore the x-ray of Woman Ironing captures best the characteristics of the brushstrokes in areas such as the man's face and sleeve.

Comprehensive reports on the findings of these extensive conservation and research efforts are set to be released in 2016.

== Exhibitions ==
- 1913. Munich, Moderne Galerie Heinrich Thannhauser, Pablo Picasso, Feb.
- 1913. Stuttgart, Kgl. Kunstgebäude, Grosse Kunstausstellung, May–Oct.
- 1913. Berlin, Ausstellungshaus am Kurfürstendamm, Herbstausstellung, autumn.
- 1927. Hamburg, Kunstverein, Europäische Kunst der Gegenwart.
- 1939. Amsterdam, Stedelijk Museum, Parijsche Schilders, Feb. 25–Apr.10.
- 1939. New York, The Museum of Modern Art, Picasso: Forty Years of His Art, Nov.15, 1939–Jan. 7, 1940. Traveled to the Art Institute of Chicago, Feb. 1–Mar. 3, 1940 and Boston, Institute of Modern Art, Apr. 27–May 26, 1940.
- 1941. New York, The Museum of Modern Art, Masterpieces of Picasso, July 15–Sept. 7.
- 1944. New York, The Museum of Modern Art, Art in Progress, May 24–Oct 15.
- 1947. The Minneapolis Institute of Arts, 20th Century French Painters, May 3–June 1.
- 1947. New York, M. Knoedler and Co., Picasso Before 1907, Oct. 15–Nov. 8.
- 1949. The Art Gallery of Toronto, Picasso, Apr.
- 1952. Paris, Musée National d'Art Moderne, L'Oeuvre du XXe siècle, May–June.
- 1957. New York, The Museum of Modern Art, Picasso: 75th Anniversary Exhibition, May 22–Sep. 8.
- 1965. New York, Solomon R. Guggenheim Museum, Masterpieces of Modern Art, Thannhauser Foundation.
- 1974. New York, Solomon R. Guggenheim Museum, Concentrations 1: Nine Modern Masters from the Guggenheim Museum and Thannhauser Collections.
- 1980. New York, The Museum of Modern Art, Pablo Picasso: A Retrospective, May 14–Sept. 16.
- 1986. New York, Solomon R. Guggenheim Museum, The Expressive Figure from Rousseau to Bacon.
- 1987. New York, Solomon R. Guggenheim Museum, Fifty Years of Collecting: Painting by Modern Masters, fall 1987–spring 1988.
- 1989. New York, Solomon R. Guggenheim Museum.
- 1990. New York, Solomon R. Guggenheim Museum.
- 1990. Venice, Palazzo Grassi.
- 1992. The Montreal Museum of Fine Arts.
- 1992. New York, Solomon R. Guggenheim Museum.
- 1997. Washington, D.C., National Gallery of Art.
- 1998. New York, Solomon R. Guggenheim Museum, Rendezvous: Masterpieces from the Centre Georges Pompidou and the Guggenheim Museums, Oct. 16, 1998–Jan. 24, 1999.
- 2001. New York, Solomon R. Guggenheim Museum, The Global Guggenheim: Selections from the Extended Collections, Feb. 9–Apr. 22.
- 2001. Bilbao, Guggenheim Museum, Selections From The Thannhauser Collection, Oct. 2, 2001–Feb. 17, 2002.
- 2002. Las Vegas, Guggenheim Hermitage Museum, Art through the Ages: Masterpieces of Painting from Titian to Picasso, Aug. 30, 2002–Mar. 2, 2003.
- 2006. New York, Solomon R. Guggenheim Museum, Spanish Painting from El Greco to Picasso: Time, Truth, and History, Nov. 17, 2006–Mar. 28, 2007.
- 2011. New York, Solomon R. Guggenheim Museum, The Great Upheaval: Modern Art from the Guggenheim Collection, 1910–1918, Feb. 4–June 1.
- 2012. New York, Solomon R. Guggenheim Museum, Picasso Black and White, Oct. 5, 2012–Jan. 23, 2013.

== Influences on other artists ==
While it is difficult to deny the artistic genius of Pablo Picasso and his impact on the development of modern and contemporary art, it is also certain that most of his influence on other artist's works derives from later periods in his career.

Woman Ironing directly inspired the work of artist Vik Muniz (1961—), a photographer and mixed-media artist, best known for repurposing everyday materials for intricate and heavily layered recreations of canonical artworks. His Woman Ironing (Isis),<ref>Muniz, Woman Ironing (Isis). Burger Collection</ref> from the series Pictures of Garbage (2008), is a homage to Picasso's painting. Muniz collaborated with a team of men and women who earned their living by collecting recyclable materials. A woman named Isis Rodrigues Garros, who had ended up working at the landfill, became the woman ironing. Muniz engaged with Picasso's painting by depicting contemporary urban laborers.

== See also ==
- De strijkster (Woman Ironing) by Rik Wouters
- Girl in a Chemise
