= Concord Blue =

Renewable energy company

- Industry: Renewable energy
- Founded: 2002
- Headquarters: Germany
- Area served: Worldwide
- Key people: Charlie Thannhaeuser (CEO & CTO)
- Website: concordblueenergy.com

Concord Blue is a renewable energy company founded in Germany in 2002, which has built waste-to-energy plants in Germany, India, Japan, and the United States, often in partnerships with governments or other companies. With headquarters, the company has developed a steam thermolysis-based production of CO_{2}-free hydrogen and bioenergy from waste and biomass technology. The patented process is called the Concord Blue Reformer.

== History ==
Concord Blue was founded by Charlie Thannhaeuser in Germany in 2002, with its first pilot plant as part of an innovation center initiative focused on renewable energy. Following the success of this pilot plant, the company received government support. It then established a subsidiary in India, where it also built three research and development plants, in partnership with regional engineering and wastewater treatment company Rochem India. By 2009, it had plants in India and Japan, with its Japan facility in Omuta being the first biomass-to-hydrogen facility in the world.

In 2016, Concord Blue partnered with Lockheed Martin to open a 250-kilowatt bioenergy plant in Owego, New York.

As of 2025, company founder Charlie Thannhaeuser continues to serve as CEO and CTO. As part of the German Finance Ministers Dr. Joerg Kukies Delegates trip to the Gulf Region, Concord Blue has signed with the PIF subsidiary SIRC for the first phase of a sewage sludge to hydrogen project in Saudi Arabia.
