= Tannhäuser (disambiguation) =

Tannhäuser was a legendary medieval German Minnesänger and poet.

Tannhäuser can also refer to:

- Tannhäuser (opera), an 1845 opera by Richard Wagner
- Tannhäuser (novel), an 1877 Danish novel by Holger Drachmann
- Tannhäuser (board game), a French war board game
- Matikanetannhauser, a Japanese racehorse named after the opera.

== See also ==
- Tannhauser Gate
