= Angela Rosengart =

Swiss art dealer and collector (1932–2026)

Angela Rosengart (28 June 1932 – 30 June 2026) was a Swiss art dealer, collector and philanthropist. She was the co-founder of the Rosengart Collection Museum in Lucerne.

Rosengart died on 30 June 2026, at the age of 94.
