= Hürben (Krumbach) =

Coordinates: 48°14′45″N 10°22′10″E

Hürben, today the eastern part of Krumbach in Bavarian Swabia, was an independent village before it was incorporated into the neighbouring town of Krumbach in the year 1902. The Kammel was in most parts the border between Krumbach and Hürben.

== History ==
Hürben was found around the year 1000. Until 1805 Hürben was part of the Margraviate of Burgau, which was part of the Habsburg Further Austria. In the year 1805 Hürben became Bavarian by the Peace of Pressburg. In the year 1902 Hürben became part of Krumbach, which received its town charter seven years before. Jewish families were allowed to live in Hürben, though it was still dominantly Christian.

== Gallery ==
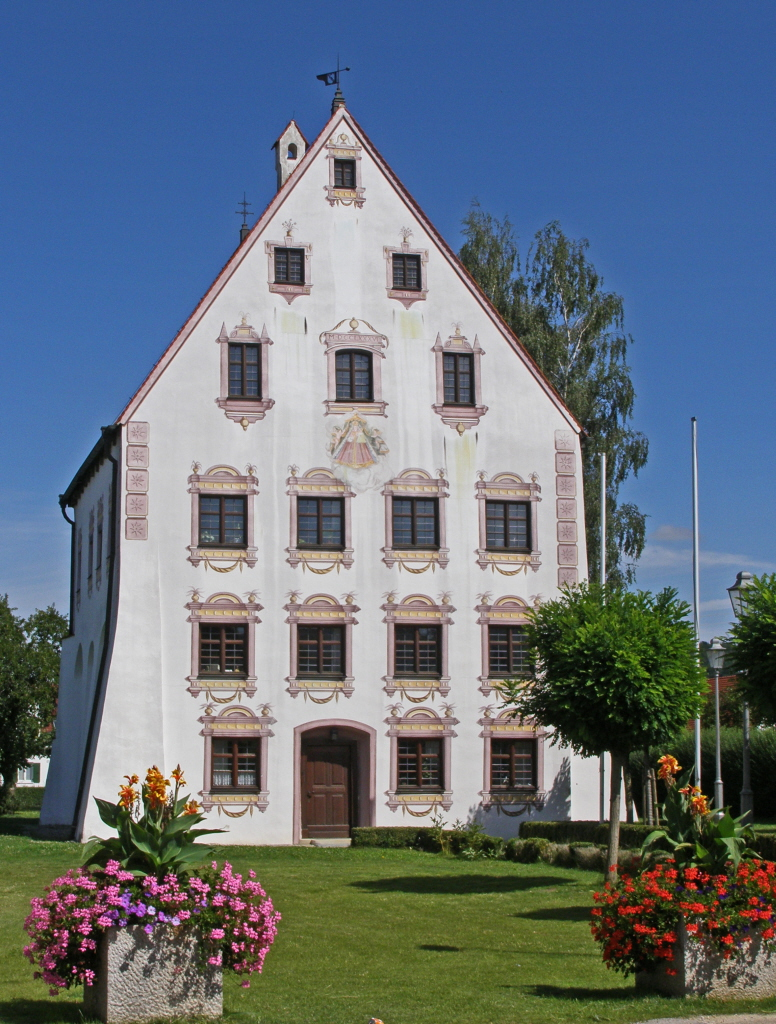
moated castle of Hürben

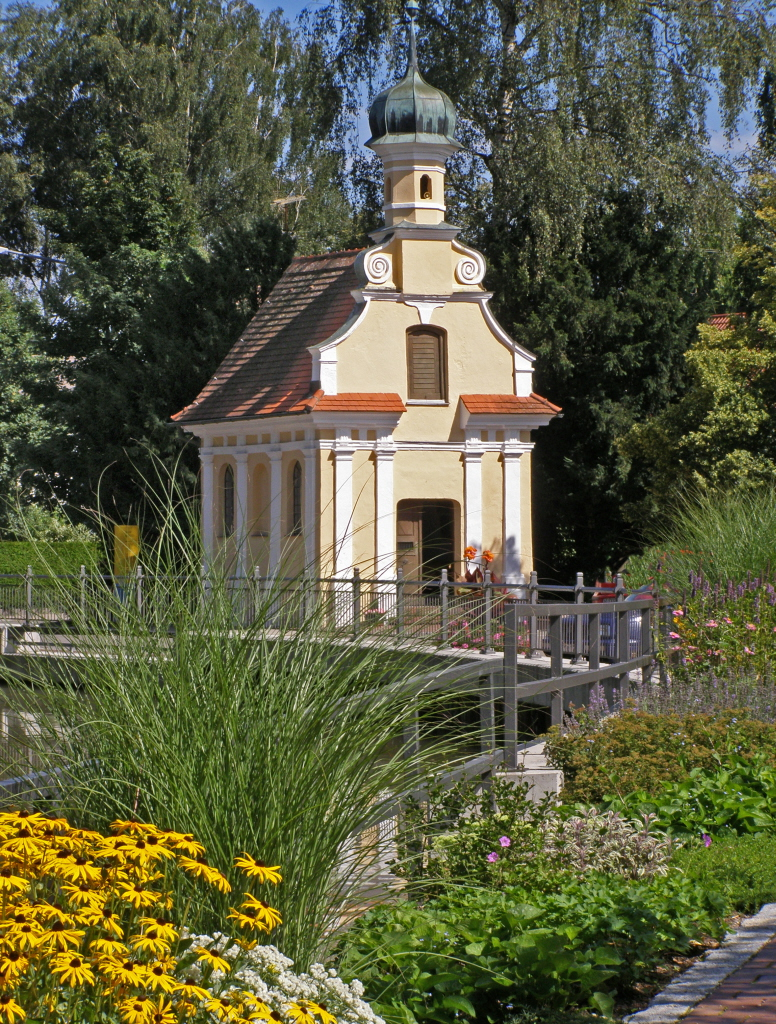
Mühlkapelle at the stream Kammel

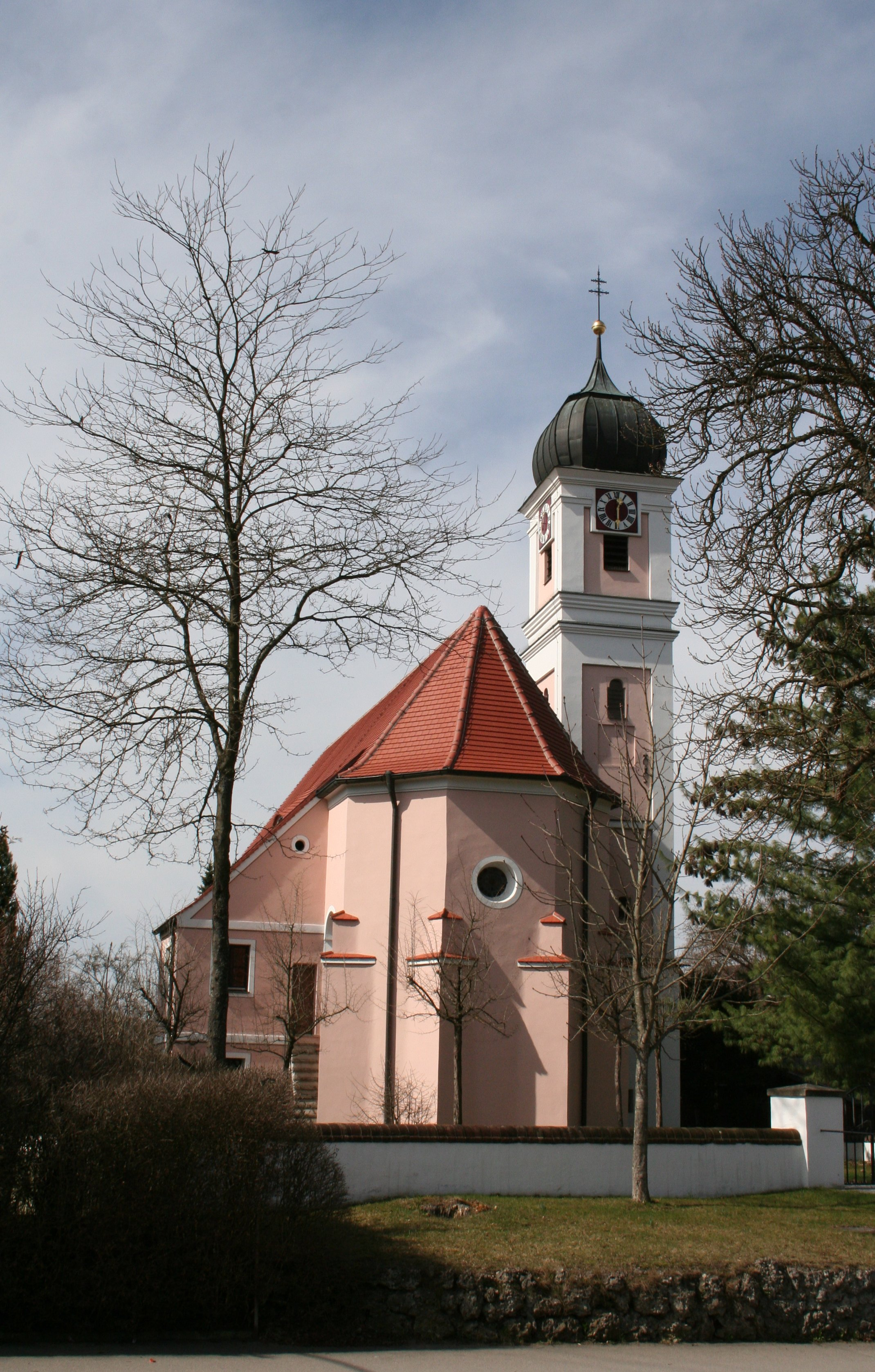
church St. Ulrich

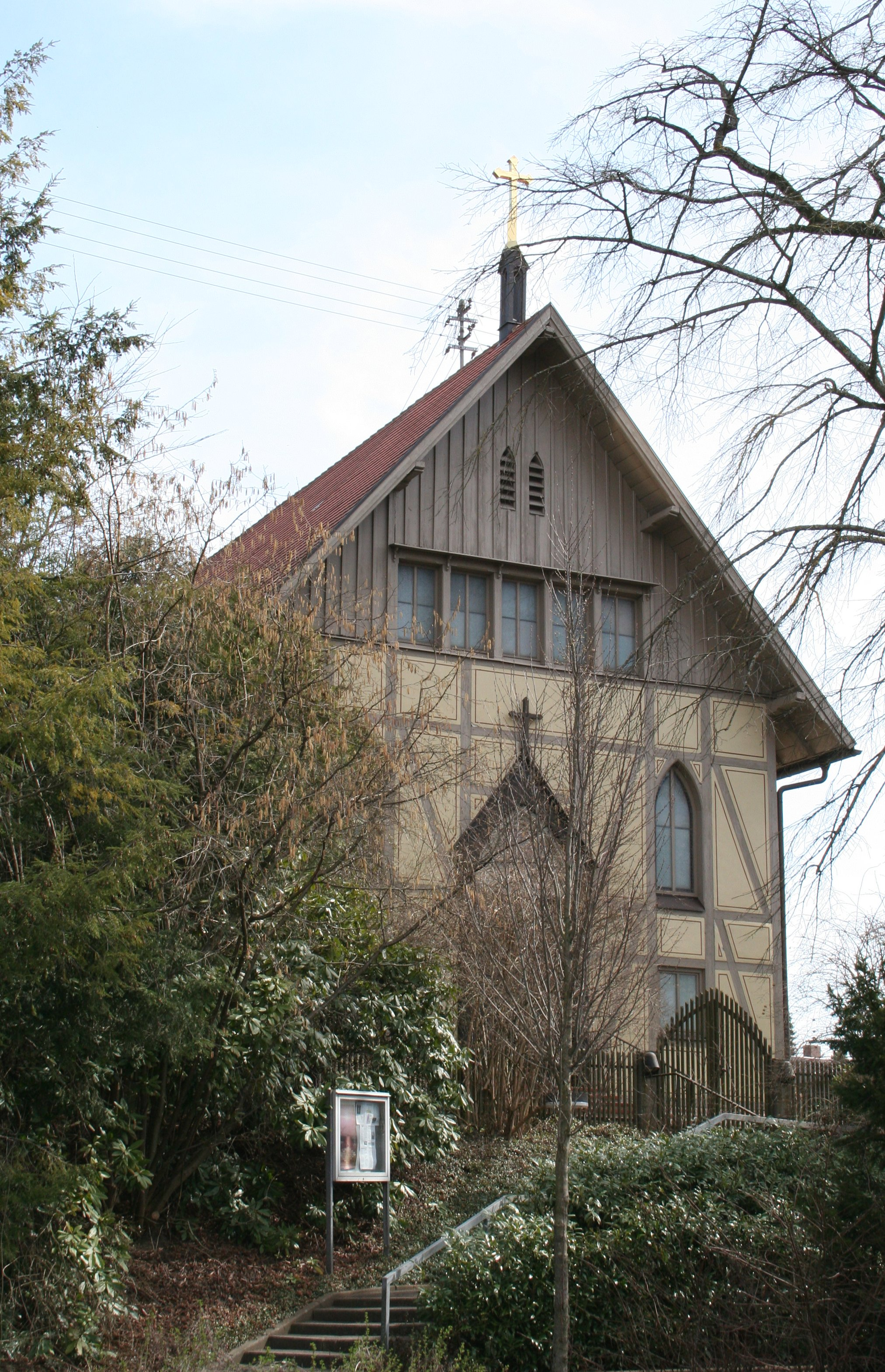
Lindlkirche

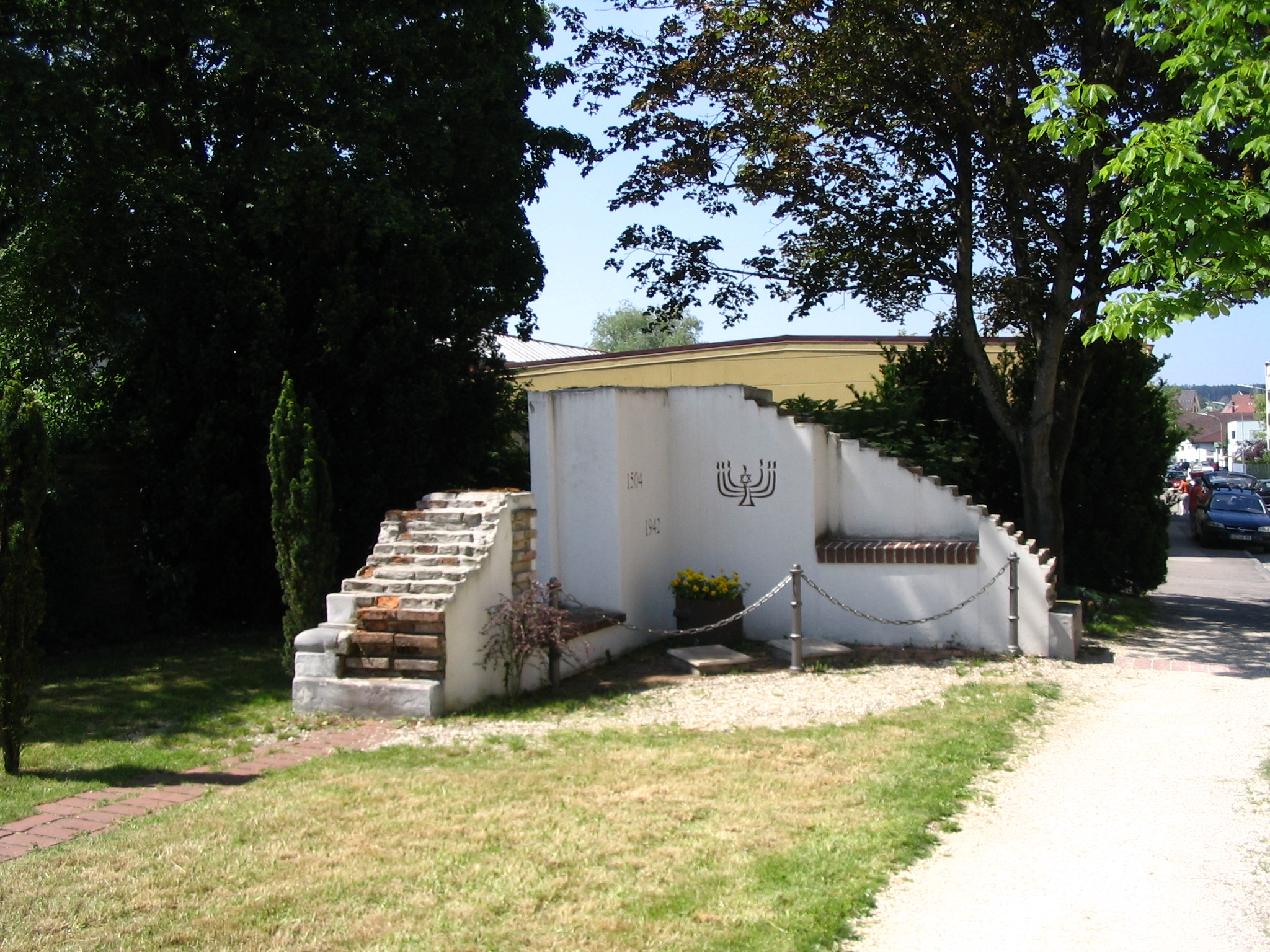
memorial place at the place of the former synagogue
