= Thannhauser Galleries =

Modernist art galleries in Germany

The Thannhauser Galleries was established in the early 20th century by Heinrich Thannhauser and Justin K. Thannhauser. Their cutting-edge exhibitions helped forge the reputations of many of the most important Modernist artists.

== History ==
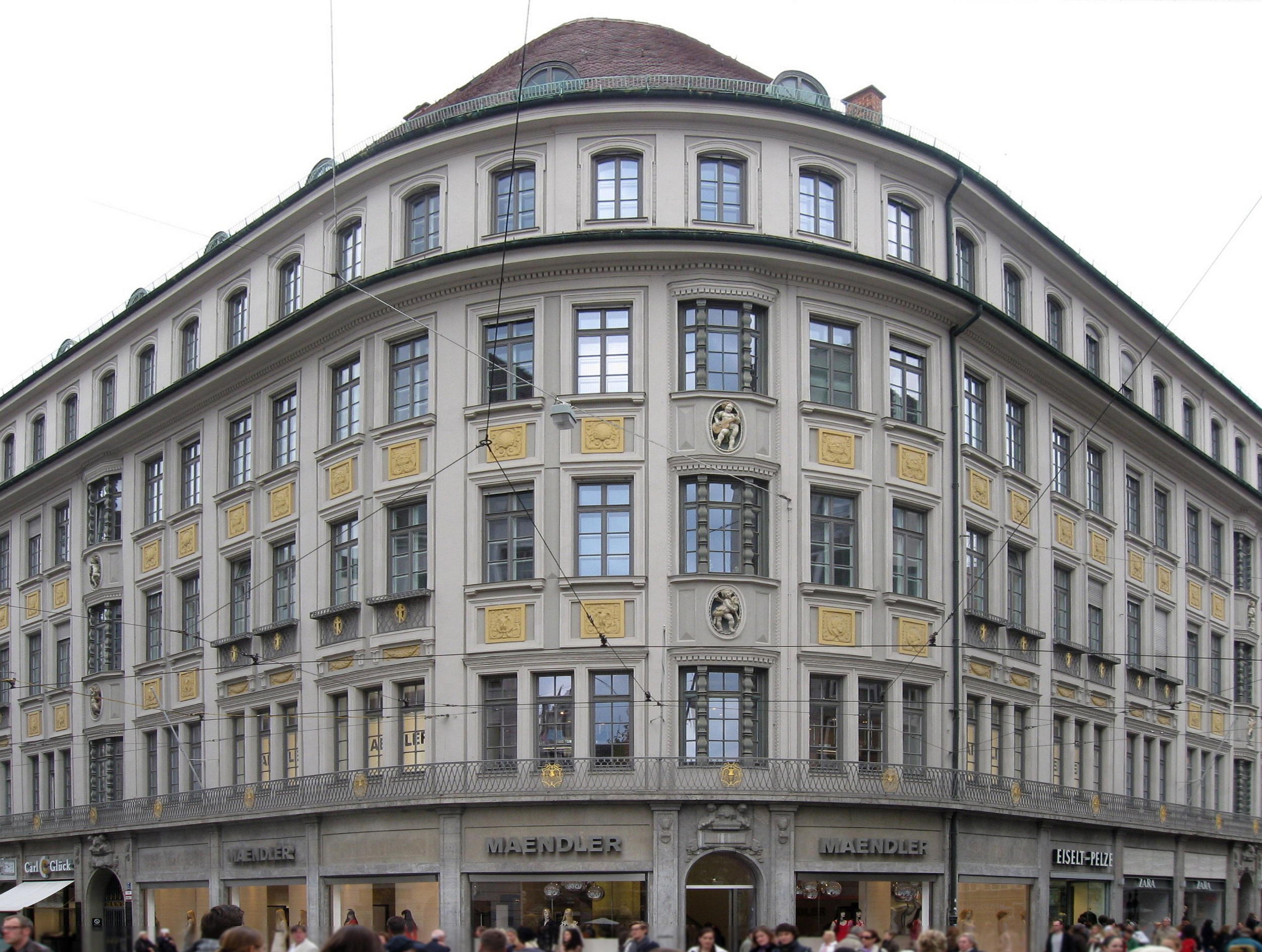
The Arco-Palais today on Theatinerstraße 7. The Thannhauser Gallery occupied over 2,600 square feet of this building on the ground and first floor.

Heinrich Thannhauser (1859–1935) opened the first of the Thannhauser Galleries in Munich in the fall of 1909, after deciding to leave the gallery that he had previously opened with his friend Franz Josef Brakl. He called his new business the Modern Gallery (Moderne Galerie) and established it in the glass-domed Arcopalais at Theatinerstraße 7, in the heart of Munich's shopping district. The gallery was, by most accounts, one of the largest and most beautiful art galleries in the city. Designed by local architect Paul Wenz, it occupied over 2,600 square feet of the glass-domed Arcopalais. The gallery was divided between two floors, with nine exhibition rooms on the ground floor and an open, skylit gallery on the floor above. Several of the rooms were set up as domestic environments, as was fashionable at the time.

In its early years, the Moderne Galerie (more commonly known as the Moderne Galerie Heinrich Thannhauser) exhibited the work of some of the most notable French Impressionists, Post-Impressionists, and Italian Futurists. It also presented the earliest exhibitions of contemporary German movements and artists who would later come to define the avant-garde: Neue Künstlervereinigung München (New Artists' Association of Munich) in 1909, and Der Blaue Reiter (The Blue Rider) in 1911. Both exhibitions featured the work of Vasily Kandinsky, considered by many to be the pioneer of abstraction in art. The gallery also participated in the Armory Show of 1913, the watershed exhibition that introduced European Modernism to the United States, and mounted the first major Pablo Picasso retrospective during the same year.

In 1919, Heinrich Thannhauser's son, Justin K. Thannhauser (1892–1976), established a branch of the gallery in Lucerne (Luzern), Switzerland. He ran the branch until 1921, when he was called back to Munich to assist his father, who had developed a serious condition in his larynx. The Lucerne gallery continued to be under Justin's direction until 1928, when his cousin Siegfried Rosengart assumed control and changed its name to Galerie Rosengart.

Over the years, Heinrich and Justin Thannhauser purchased, traded or had on consignment 107 works by Van Gogh or attributed to him. In 2017, the Van Gogh Museum in Amsterdam published the catalogue The Thannhauser Gallery: Marketing Van Gogh.

Justin established a third branch in Berlin in 1927. During the 1930s, however, the business operations of all of the Thannhauser Galleries were sanctioned and delayed by the Nazi government. The Nazis were vehemently opposed to the art of the avant-garde, which they branded as "degenerate art." After the death of Heinrich in 1935 and the formal closing of the Galleries in 1937, Thannhauser and his family left for Paris. In 1940, they moved to New York, where Justin, together with his second wife, Hilde (1919–91), established himself as an art dealer.

The Art Dealing Family's support of artistic progress, and their advancement of the early careers of artists like Kandinsky, Franz Marc, and Paul Klee, paralleled the vision of the Solomon R. Guggenheim Museum’s founder, Solomon R. Guggenheim (1861–1949). In recognition of that connection, and in honor of his first wife and two sons (who died at tragically young ages), Justin Thannhauser bequeathed the most essential and iconic works of his collection, including over 30 works by Picasso, to the Guggenheim Foundation in 1963. Beginning in 1965, the works were on loan to the museum and on view in the Thannhauser Wing. The collection formally entered the Guggenheim's permanent holdings in 1978, two years after Thannhauser's death, and the museum received a bequest of 10 additional works after the death of Hilde Thannhauser in 1991. The gift, containing over 70 works in total, provides an important antecedent to the Guggenheim Museum's contemporary collection and thus has allowed the institution to represent the full range of modern art.

== Artists ==
Notable exhibited artists include:

- Max Beckmann
- Georges Braque
- Mary Cassatt
- Paul Cézanne
- Edgar Degas
- André Derain
- Otto Dix
- Paul Gauguin
- Vincent van Gogh
- George Grosz
- Vasily Kandinsky
- Paul Klee
- Max Klinger
- Max Liebermann
- Édouard Manet
- Henri Matisse
- Claude Monet
- Edvard Munch
- Pablo Picasso
- Camille Pissarro
- Pierre-Auguste Renoir
- Alfred Sisley
- Henri de Toulouse-Lautrec
- Maurice de Vlaminck

== Catalogues ==
Up to 1914, all catalogues were based on exhibitions.

=== Moderne Kunsthandlung Brakl & Thannhauser ===
- 1908: Vincent van Gogh – Prices indicated ("Die Preise verstehen sich in holländ. Gulden.")

=== Moderne Galerie Heinrich Thannhauser, München ===
- 1909: Impressionisten
- January 1910: Cuno Amiet & Giovanni Giacometti
- Spring 1910: Félix Vallotton
- April 1910: Édouard Manet (aus der Sammlung Pellerin)
- Summer 1910: (Heymel Collection)
- August 1910: Paul Gauguin
- mid-July – August 15, 1911: Carl Schuch
- Oct. 1911: (Theodor Alt)
- February 13 – March 10, 1912: Kollektiv-Ausstellung Edvard Munch

==== War time selections from the stock of the gallery ====
- Moderne Galerie Heinrich Thannhauser (folder, without date) (pre-1916)
- Katalog der Modernen Galerie Heinrich Thannhauser, introduction by Wilhelm Hausenstein and 174 reproductions, Munich 1916
- Nachtragswerk I mit 76 Abbildungen zur grossen Katalogausgabe 1916, Moderne Galerie Heinrich Thannhauser, Munich, September 1916
- Nachtragswerk II mit 105 Abbildungen zur grossen Katalogausgabe 1916, Moderne Galerie Heinrich Thannhauser, Munich, Juli 1917
- Nachtragswerk III mit 115 ganzseitigen Abbildungen zur grossen Katalogausgabe 1916, Moderne Galerie Heinrich Thannhauser, Munich, 1918

=== Galerien Thannhauser, Berlin – Luzern – München ===
- Eröffnungs-Ausstellung unseres neuen Berliner Hauses, Bellevuestr. 13, illustrated catalogue, dated June 1927
