= List of Picasso artworks 1889–1900 =

This is a partial list of artworks produced by Pablo Picasso from 1889 to 1900.

== 1890 ==
- Le petit picador jaune (1889–1890), oil on wood, 24 x 19 cm, The Picasso Estate
- Pigeons (1890), lead pencil on paper, 11 x 22 cm, Museu Picasso
- Course de taureaux et colombes (1890–1892), pencil on paper, 13.5 x 20.2 cm, Museu Picasso
- Hercule et sa matraque (1890)

== 1896 ==
- L'enfant de chœur (1896), oil on canvas, 76 x 50 cm, Museu de Montserrat
- Portrait de la mère de l'artiste (1896), pastel on paper, 49.8 x 39 cm, Museu Picasso
- Autoportrait aux cheveux courts (1896) oil on canvas, 46.5 x 31.5 cm, Museu Picasso
- Tête de fille (1896), oil on canvas on paperboard, 29.8 x 26.1 cm, Museu Picasso
- Autoportrait mal coiffé (1896)
- Portrait du père de l'artiste (1896), oil on canvas on cardboard, 42.3 x 30.8 cm, Museu Picasso
- Tête d'un homme barbu (La Llotja) (1896), oil on canvas, 28.5 x 36 cm, Private Collection
- Portrait de la tante Pepa (1896), oil on canvas, 57.5 x 50.5 cm, Museu Picasso
- Scène biblique (1896), oil on canvas, 35.5 x 52 cm, Museu Picasso
- Autoportrait en gentilhomme du XVIIIe siècle (1896), oil on canvas, 55.8 x 46 cm, Museu Picasso
- Nu [Étude] (1896), charcoal and black pencil on paper, 62 x 42.7 cm, Museu Picasso
- Courses de taureaux (1896), oil on canvas, 13.7 x 22.1 cm, Museu Picasso
- Courses de taureaux (1896), pen and ink on paper, 14.6 x 22.3 cm, Musée Picasso

== 1897 ==
- Science and charity (1897), oil on canvas, 197 cm × 249.5 cm, Museu Picasso

== 1898 ==
- Fille bohémienne devant La Musciera (1898), pastel on paper, 44.5 x 59.7 cm, Private Collection
- Fille assise (1898)
- Portrait de Lola (1898), conte pencil on paper, 32.2 x 24.7 cm, Museu Picasso
- Femme à la guitare (1898)
- Garçon bohémien nu (1898), oil on canvas, 49.7 x 32 cm
- L'aumône (1898)
- Portrait de Carmen (1898), conte pencil on paper, 48 x 31.5 cm, Museu Picasso
- Autoportrait (1898), conte pencil and color pencil on paper, 17.5 x 10.5 cm, Museu Picasso
- Le charnier (1898), conte pencil, sanguine, and watercolor on paper, 10.5 x 17.5 cm, Museu Picasso
- Homme lisant (1898), conte pencil and watercolor on paper, 17.5 x 10.5 cm, Museu Picasso
- Portrait de Pepe-Illo (1898), conte pencil and color pencil on paper, 17.5 x 10.5 cm, Museu Picasso
- Saeta et son maître (1898), conte pencil and watercolor on paper, 17.5 x 10.5 cm, Museu Picasso
- Au bord du lit (1898), pencil on paper, 18.5 x 13 cm, Museu Picasso
- Trois roses (1898)
- Carter (1898)
- Tête de cheval (1898)
- Cheval (1898), color pencil, 25 x 28 cm, The Picasso Estate
- Cheval Attele (1898), charcoal and watercolor on paper, 24.4 x 27.9 cm
- Lola de profil (1898), conte pencil on paper, Private Collection
- Maisons de Horta d'Ebre (1898), pencil on paper, 16 x 20 cm, Museu Picasso
- Maisons de Horta d'Ebre (1898), oil on canvas, 27 x 39 cm, Private Collection
- Maison dans un champ de blé (1898), oil on canvas, 33 x 44 cm, Museu Picasso
- Paysage de Horta d'Ebre (1898)
- Hermitage de Saint Antoine du Tossai (1898)
- Mulet (1898), oil on canvas, 27.7 x 36.4 cm, Museu Picasso
- Chèvres sauvages (1898), conte pencil on paper, 16.1 x 24.8 cm, Museu Picasso
- La caverne (1898), oil on wood, 12.8 x 18.1 cm, Museu Picasso
- Chèvres (1898), pencil on paper, 32.3 x 24.5 cm, Museu Picasso
- Jeune berger (1898), conte pencil on paper, 32.2 x 24.5 cm, Museu Picasso
- Mas du Quiquet (1898), oil on canvas, 27 x 40 cm, Museu Picasso
- Berger courtisant (1898), conte pencil on paper, 10.8 x 13.3 cm, Museu Picasso
- Bûcheron (1898)
- Moulin (1898)
- Paysan et moulin (1898)
- Garçon de Horta d'Ebre (1898)
- Dessins (1898), conte pencil on paper, 32 x 24.5 cm, Private Collection
- Autoportrait (1898), conte pencil, 33 x 23.5 cm, Private Collection

== 1899 ==
- Tête d'homme à la Greco (1899)
- Portrait de Jacint Reventos (1899)
- Portrait de Carlos Casagemas (1899)
- Menu de Els Quatre Gats (1899)
- Le divan (1899)
- Fenêtre fermée (1899)
- Portrait d'Utrillo (1899)
- Portrait de Jaume Sabartés (1899)
- Portrait de Oriol Martí (1899)
- Caricature (Portrait de Josep Rocarol) (1899)
- Lola Picasso, sœur de l'artiste (1899)

The Artist's Sister Lola (1899-1900), Cleveland Museum of Art

- Autoportrait (1899)
- Allégorie: jeune homme, femme et grotesques (1899)
- La chata (1899)
- Portrait de Josep Cardona (1899)
- Portrait du père de l'artiste (1899)
- Femmes traversant une place (1899)
- Paysage de Horta d'Ebre (1899)
- Homme assis (1899)
- Femme nue assise (1899)
- Homme (1899)
- Buste de Don José (1899)
- Enfant assis (1899)
- Fille suçant son pouce (1899)
- Nu (1899)
- Homme nu (1899)
- Femme nue assise (1899)
- La Muse (1899)
- Un vieil homme sale (1899)
- Couple assis à une table (1899)
- Patio andalou (1899)
- Couple (1899)
- Le baiser (1899)
- Couple andalou (1899)
- Don José tenant un parapluie (1899)
- Don José avec un pardessus (1899)
- Portrait de Don José (1899)
- Don José sur le rivage (1899)
- Picadors (1899)
- Fenêtre fermée (1899)
- Portrait de Mercedes (1899)
- Intérieur avec vue sur fond enneigé (1899)
- Lola devant une fenêtre (1899)
- Portrait de Lola (1) (1899)
- Portrait d'homme (1899)
- Portrait d'Angel F de Soto (1899)
- A l'extérieur de l'aire de danse (1899)
- Aumône (1899)
- Femme qui prie (1899)
- Femme qui prie et enfant (1899)
- Scène d'hôpital (Derniers moments) (1899)
- Prêtre qui visite un homme mourant (Derniers moments) [Étude] (1899)
- Au chevet de l'homme mourant (1899)
- Au lit de mort (1899)
- Homme mourant et sa famille (1899)
- Les derniers moments (1899)
- Génies faibles [Étude] (1899)
- Portrait de Lola (2) (1899)
- Femme assise (1899)
- Au chevet de la femme mourante (1899)
- Homme lisant et quelques etudes (1899)
- Trois nus et main droite (1899)
- L'enfant mort-né (1899)
- Deux homes (1899)
- Portrait de Ramón Reventós (1899)
- Portrait de Joan Vidal i Ventosa (1899)
- Études (1899)
- Portrait de Carles Casagemas (1899)
- Portrait (1899)
- Études et têtes (1899)
- Caricature de Joaquim Mir (1899)
- Le sage (1899)
- Groupe de femmes qui aide d'autres femmes (1899)
- Caricature de violoniste (1899)
- Le baiser (1899)
- Dame avec pékinois et autres personages (1899)
- Affiche 'Carnival 1900 [Étude] (1899)
- Gente Nueva [Étude] (1899)
- Manola (1899)
- Danseuse de flamenco (1899)
- Femmes (1899)
- Le cloître de la cathédrale (1899)
- Têtes d'hommes et femmes [Études] (1899)
- Têtes et figures [Études] (1899)
- Têtes et main [Études] (1899)
- Donneur d'aumône [Études] (1899)
- Tête de femme [Études] (1899)
- Autoportrait [Études] (1899)
- Buste de femme et dessins de Carles Casagemas et Joaquim Mir (1899)
- Homme à terre (1899)
- Quatre femmes qui pleurent [Études] (1899)
- Femme assise avec châle (1899)
- Portrait d'homme (1899)
- Mère et fille (1899)
- Picasso et le peintre Casagemas (1899)
- Buste de femme [Études] (1899)
- Café musical, nain et buste de femme (1899)
- Joueurs de cartes, femme et nain (1899)
- Dessin pour 'Art' [Études] (1899)
- A deux doigts de la mort (1899)
- A la mort (1899)
- Figures dans la rue et études de têtes (1899)
- Courses de taureaux (recto); Esquisses (verso) (1899)
- Chanteuse (recto); Tête d'espagnole (verso) (1899)
- Les derniers moment(1899)

== 1900 ==
- Le Moulin de la Galette (1900)
- Les amants dans la rue (L' étreinte) (1900)
- Couple espagnol devant une auberge (1900)
- Le peintre Opisso (1900)
- Casagemas avec cape et canne (1900)
- Portrait de Manolo Hugué (1900)
- L'étreinte dans la mansarde (1900)
- L'étreinte brutale (1900)
- Dans la pièce (La loge) (1900)
- Deux femmes assises à une table et deux mains qui écrivent (1900)
- Deux femmes (1900)
- Deux femmes assises (1900)
- Petite fille en habits du Dimanche (1900)
- Bonne avec bébé dans ses bras (1900)
- Bonne avec deux enfants (1900)
- Midinette de Paris (1900)
- Dame avec chapeau et écharpe autour du cou (1900)
- Prêtre (1900)
- Femme assise, visage plein (1900)
- Parisienne (1900)
- Portrait de Sabatés (1900)
- Portrait d'Anglada Camarasa (1900)
- French cancan (1900)
- Les arènes de Barcelona (1900)
- Le matador (1900)
- La fin du numéro (1900)
- Courses de taureaux (Corrida) (1900)
- Casagemas de face et de profil (1900)
- Sebastianus III König (Portrait de Sebastià Junyer-Vidal) (1900)
- La Musclera (1900)
- Arrastre (croquis) (1900)
- Intérieur de Els Quatre Gats (1900)
- Portrait de Eveli Torent (1900)
- Portrait de Creus (1900)
- Jeune fille devant une fenêtre ouverte (1900)
- Portrait de Daniel Masgoumeri (1900)
- Portrait de Jaume Sabartés ('Poeta decadente') (1900)
- Portrait d'homme de profil (1900)
- Portrait (1900)
- Portrait de Carles Casagemas (1900)
- Riera de Saint Jean vu d'une fenêtre (1900)
- Masque de visage (1900)
- Carnaval (1900)
- Courses de taureaux (Corrida) (1900)
- Taureau tiré par la queue (1900)
- La fin de la route (L'ange de la mort) (1900)
- Picador et 'Monosario' (1900)
- Portrait de Ramon Surinach i Senties (1900)
- Déjeuner à l'extérieur (1900)
- Femme qui rêve de Venise (1900)
- Portrait d'auteur (1900)
- Homme en manteau espagnol (1900)
- Eveli Torent (1900)
- Joan B Fonte (1900)
- Josep Cardona (1900)
- Josep Rocarol (1900)
- Poster pour 'Drabas Criollos' (1900)
- Auparavant (1900)
- Maintenant (1900)
- Picasso et Pallares arrivant à Paris (1900)
- Autoportrait et études (1900)
- Une rue de Montmartre (1900)
- Hommes vaniteux (1900)
- Germaine (1900)
- Le peintre Sébastien Junyent (1900)
- Nogueras Oller et personnages dans Els Quatre Gats (1900)
- La sortie de l'exposition universelle, Paris (1900)
- Scène tauromachique (1900)
- Portrait de Joaquim Mir (1900)
- Pere Romeu (1900)
- Els Quatre Gats' menu [Étude] (1900)
- Affiche 'Caja de Previsión y Socorro' [Étude] (1900)
- Affiche 'El Liberal' [Étude] (1900)
- Dessin pour le journal 'Joventut' (1900)
- Etre ou ne pas être (1900)
- Corrida [Études] (1900)
- Enterrement rural (1900)
- Personnages sur une place bordée d'arbres (1900)
- Lettre de Casagemas et Picasso à Cinto Reventós (1900)
- Cochers (1900)
- Femmes au café (1900)
- Danseuse et femmes (1900)
- Baraque foraine (1900)
- Deux personages (1900)
- Femme en rouge (1900)
- Dans l'arène (1900)
- El clam de les verges (1900)
- Frommage a la creme! (1900)
- A la belle tomate! (1900)
