= La Gommeuse =

1901 painting by Pablo Picasso

- Artist: Pablo Picasso
- Year: 1901
- Medium: Oil on canvas
- Movement: Blue Period
- Dimensions: 81.3 cm × 54 cm (32.0 in × 21 in)

Caricature of Pere Mañach on the reverse

Pere Mañach, 1901, National Gallery of Art

La Gommeuse [la ɡɔmøz] is a 1901 oil-on-canvas painting by the Spanish artist Pablo Picasso. It dates from his Blue Period and is noted for its caricature of Picasso's friend Pere Mañach painted on the reverse. Gommeuse was sexually charged slang of the time for café-concert singers and their songs. It was offered for sale ex the William I. Koch collection at a Sotheby's, New York, auction on 5 November 2015. The painting realized $67.5 million at the sale, a record for a Blue Period Picasso, placing the painting among the most expensive ever sold.

== Background ==
The painting was executed in the second half of 1901 following Picasso's successful exhibition at the Vollard gallery that June. This was at the start of his Blue Period of 1901 to 1904, thought to have been occasioned by the suicide of his friend Carlos Casagemas earlier in the year, a time when his paintings were somewhat melancholic and characterized by somber monochromatic tones in blue and green. During this time, Picasso, who was nearly 20, was sharing a studio flat in the Boulevard de Clichy with his friend Pere Mañach and was exploring the carnal pleasures of youth. Mañach was a Catalan anarchist who worked as a talent scout for art dealers and was responsible for organising Picasso's successful 1901 Vollard exhibition. A portrait of Mañach, which is now housed in the National Gallery of Art, Washington, was a feature of the Vollard show.

== Description ==
La Gommeuse is a nude portrait of a cabaret performer. The word "gommeuse" was a term used to describe cafe concert singers who were dressed in a suggestive manner. This subject matter reflects the pleasures of the Parisian nightlife, in which Picasso and his friend, Pere Mañach were immersed. The identity of the model is unknown, but she is unabashed by her nakedness and poses with a striking directness, as though with a sense of defiance.

Picasso painted La Gommeuse in his studio on Boulevard de Clichy. A painting on the wall of the studio can be seen behind the woman, which appears to be a large, blue canvas depicting a figure wearing a dress and red stockings. It is similar to another painting that Picasso had created earlier in 1901, which was titled Nude with red stockings.

The model in this painting is displayed in the foreground to the left, her body outlined against the flat background to give emphasis to her figure. Her body is depicted using tones of green and ochre. The central theme of the image is of a woman who is both a siren and a figure of loneliness. Her figure is slumped, giving an impression of physical exhaustion and her face offers a sad, contemplative expression. Picasso historian Marilyn McCully commented that, "The depictions of syphilitic prostitutes and poverty-stricken mothers in his Blue Period of late 1901-1902 was in many ways anticipated in La Gommeuse and works related to it".

=== Hidden caricature ===
A caricature of Picasso's friend Pere Mañach can be seen on the reverse and is inscribed "Recuerdo a Mañach en el día de su santo", demonstrating that the painting was intended as a gift for Mañach on his Saint's Day (29 June). The caricature is intentionally irreverent, depicting Mañach naked except for a red and yellow striped turban on his head. He is placed in a suggestive pose, urinating into the landscape.

The caricature remained undiscovered for over a century. It was revealed under the lining of the painting when conservation work took place in 2000. William Koch displayed in his home with a custom-made display so that both paintings could be viewed from opposite sides of the same wall.

== Significance and legacy ==
Helena Newman, chair of impressionist and modern art for Sotheby’s in Europe described the painting as, "an absolutely incredible and major blue period work" and opined that, "The value sits in the front, but it [the reverse] does give you a glimpse into what Picasso’s life must have been like in 1901 when he had just arrived in Paris and was still a relatively impoverished artist."

Picasso historian Marilyn McCully summarised the significance of the painting, stating that it represents a pivotal moment in Picasso’s artistic development in 1901.

The major influence was Toulouse Lautrec, both in subject matter – café scenes, prostitutes and dance halls – and, to some extent, technique, but Picasso's subsequent focus on isolated figures and restricted, subdued palettes in his new works emphasized his own exploration of the theme of loneliness and his interest in formal experimentation.

== 2015 auction ==
In 2015 La Gommeuse was sold at Sotheby's auction in New York. The owner, American billionaire Bill Koch had acquired it for $3 million in 1984. The painting achieved a price of $67.5m, which was a record for a Blue Period work.

== Provenance ==
- Ambroise Vollard, Paris
- Demotte Gallery, New York (1931)
- Josef von Sternberg, Hollywood (acquired from the above before 1935 and sold: Parke Bernet Galleries, New York, November 22, 1949, lot 89)
- Perls Gallery, New York (acquired at the above sale)
- Jacques Sarlie, New York (sold: Sotheby’s, London, October 12, 1960, lot 5)
- Galerie Alex Maguy, Paris (acquired at the above sale)
- William I. Koch (sale: Sotheby’s, London, December 4, 1984, lot 23 )
- Private collection (sale: Sotheby's, New York, November 5, 2015, lot 26)

== See also ==
- List of most expensive paintings
- Le petit picador jaune
- Science and Charity
- Child with a Dove
- 1901 in art
