= Science and Charity =

1897 painting by Pablo Picasso

- Artist: Pablo Picasso
- Year: 1897
- Medium: Oil on canvas
- Dimensions: 197 cm × 249.5 cm (78 in × 98.2 in)
- Location: Museu Picasso, Barcelona

Science and Charity is an oil on canvas painting by Pablo Picasso, which he painted in Barcelona in 1897. It is an example of one of Picasso's earliest works, as he painted it when he was only 15 years old. The painting depicts a formal composition of a sick patient in bed, attended by a doctor and a nun holding a child. It was the culmination of Picasso's academic training and displays his talent as an artist before he moved away from this style to pursue his own artistic career. The painting is housed in the collection of the Museu Picasso, Barcelona.

== Background ==
José Ruiz y Blasco, Picasso's father, was a professor of painting who felt he had failed in his own attempts to become a renowned artist. Picasso's father "had a twofold problem: the inclination to be an artist but not the gifts, and the temperament of a gentleman of leisure but not the means." He wanted his son to succeed in the world of professional painting and offered Picasso a strong academic background with hopes that he would be featured at the National Exhibition of Fine Arts in Madrid. Picasso began his academic training in Coruña and also studied in Barcelona at the Llotja School.

Picasso was influenced by the medical profession from an early age. His paternal uncle, Dr. Salvador Ruiz, was a physician and financed Picasso's art training. When Picasso entered art school at the Instituto da Guarda at the age of ten, the director, Dr. Ramon Perez Couteles, who was also a physician, became Picasso's role model.

In 1896, Picasso received rave reviews for his work The First Communion, which was presented at the Third Exhibition of Arts and Artistic Industries in Barcelona. This encouraged his father to rent a workshop for his son at No. 4 of La Plata Street in the Ribera neighbourhood, near the family home on the La Mercè Street. It was in this workshop where Picasso painted Science and Charity. He was only 15 years old.

Science and Charity is the second of three paintings created by Picasso in this period that deals with disease, the others are titled The Sick Woman (1894) and Last Moments (1899). It was created during a cholera epidemic in his hometown, which apparently caused the death of one of his sisters. The painting was also produced following the death of his younger sister Conchita, who died from diphtheria at the age of seven in 1895. Unfortunately, a newly discovered antitoxin for diphtheria was only available to wealthy Spanish families and therefore Conchita could not be saved. This was a period when new hopes created by significant medical progress in fighting diseases was at the centre of public consciousness.

== Description ==
This work is related to social realism, a trending style during the second half of the nineteenth century. The expansion of the industrial revolution had consolidated the bourgeoisie need to flaunt its new status. Influenced by writers such as Emile Zola, some painters began to paint works for this new bourgeoisie, who liked social realism. An interest in science and medical topics made this theme recur across Europe, so hospital painting emerged, a subgenre of social realism, which flourished between 1880 and 1900.

It is believed that the work was inspired by Enrique Paternina, Mother's Visit and A Hospital Room during the visit of the Head Doctor by the Sevillian painter Luis Jiménez Aranda. Picasso had previously painted a picture of a similar theme (The Sick Woman, painted in Coruña in 1894).

To prepare the work, Picasso made several previous notes and sketches. The Museu Picasso conserves six sketches of this work that are displayed by turns in the permanent collection. One of these sketches is painted on the back of another work, the Portrait of Joan Vidal Ventosa.

This is a large painting with a classical composition, where all the characters contribute towards focusing the viewer's attention on the sick patient. The light and restricted space enhance the intimate and welcoming atmosphere. Picasso used family, friends and locals as the models for this painting. José Ruiz Blasco, Picasso's father was the model for the doctor. For the sick woman and child, Picasso hired a street beggar holding a child for 10 pesetas. The model for the nun is believed to have been an adolescent dressed in a nun's habit, which was borrowed from a nun named Josefa González, who was a friend of Picasso's uncle Salvador.

The painting presents a motif of the period, which promotes the professional authority of the doctor. In this scene, the doctor is depicted coldly taking the pulse of the patient, while in contrast, the nun offers the patient empathy, care and support. The apparent coldness of the doctor reinforced the prestige of the medical professional to the public at a time when few treatments were available.

== Significance and legacy ==
Picasso painted this scene when he was just 15 years old, the culmination of his academic training in Madrid. This painting was an ambitious composition for such a young painter, and it was awarded an Honorary Mention at the General Fine Arts Exhibition in Madrid in Spring 1897, followed by the Gold Medal at the Provincial Exhibition in Malaga. Despite his success, Picasso criticised his training and did not continue to paint in this formal style. Instead, he chose to pursue an artistic career that led him away from his academic training.

Pepe Serra, director of Museu Picasso commented on Picasso's early display of artistic talent stating, "In 1897, when he painted Science and Charity, Picasso did not yet exist. This is a work by Pablo Ruiz, a boy of only fifteen who was already extraordinarily gifted technically for painting".

== Provenance ==
Once completed, the painting was presented at the General Exhibition of Fine Arts in 1897 in Madrid, and later in the Málaga Provincial Exhibition of the same year. Once the exhibition was closed, the work would remain in Málaga, at the home of Salvador Ruiz Blasco, Picasso's uncle. When Blasco died in 1918, his widow sent the work to Barcelona, where it hung in the home of the Vilató Ruiz family on Passig de Gracia until the artist donated it to the museum in 1970, along with other works. Science and Charity entered the museum with the registration number MPB110.0465 and is exhibited in Gallery 13.

== Exhibitions ==
- 2010 – "Science and Charity, revealed", Musée Picasso, Barcelona
- 1980 – Pablo Picasso: A retrospective. Museum of Modern Art, New York (May to September)
- 1982 – Picasso 1981–1973. Retrospective exhibition. Museu Picasso, Barcelona (January–February)

== See also ==
- Le petit picador jaune
- Child with a Dove
- La Gommeuse
- Picasso's Blue Period
- Picasso's Rose Period

== Bibliography ==
- Rafart Panas, Claustre (1998). Museu Picasso Guide. Barcelona: Barcelona City Council. p. 21. ISBN 84-7609-869-3.
- DDAA (2010). Ciencia y caridad al descubierto. Col·lecció Focus. Barcelona: Museu Picasso, Barcelona. ISBN 978-84-9850-277-0.
