= Emmanuel Guigon =

Museum director

- Born: 1959 (age 66–67); Morteau
- Occupation: museologist
- Known for: Director of the Museu Picasso

Emmanuel Guigon, born March 15, 1959, in Morteau, is a museologist, holds a doctorate in art history and is the current director of the Museu Picasso in Barcelona. He holds dual French-Swiss nationality. Guigon earned his doctorate in contemporary art at the Paris-Sorbonne University (France), and is a specialist in historical avant-gardes, surrealism, modern Spanish art and European post-war art. Before becoming the director of the Picasso Museum Barcelona, he was deputy director of museums in Besançon. Prior to that, he was director and head curator at the Strasbourg Museum of Modern and Contemporary Art (France) and head curator at the Valencia Institute of Modern Art (IVAM). He was a member of the Science Section at the École Pratique des Hautes Études Hispaniques Casa de Velázquez in Madrid, having previously lectured in contemporary art history at the Université de Franche-Comté (UFR) between 1985 and 1987. He is an associate member of numerous organisations, including the Training and Research Unit (UFR) of Iberian and Latin-American Studies at the Panthéon-Sorbonne University; the André Chastel Centre, Laboratoire de Recherche en Histoire de l’Art; AICA France (International Association of Art Critics); the Technical Committee of the Fonds Régional d’Art Contemporain (FRAC) Alsace; and the Board of Directors of the Société des Amis de Paul Éluard. He was named Knight in the Order of Academic Palms and Knight in the Order of Arts and Letters by the Ministry of Culture of the French government.
