= Child with a Dove =

Painting by Pablo Picasso

- Artist: Pablo Picasso
- Year: 1901
- Medium: Oil on canvas
- Movement: Blue Period
- Dimensions: 73 cm × 54 cm (29 in × 21 in)
- Location: Qatar Museums Authority

Child with a Dove (French: L'enfant au pigeon), also described as Child Holding a Dove, Child with a Pigeon is an oil-on-canvas painting by the Spanish artist Pablo Picasso, which he created in 1901 at the start of his Blue Period. The painting is a depiction of a young girl in a white dress holding a white dove, and represents an important transitional moment in the artist’s career. It was on public display at the National Gallery in London, England for nearly four decades before its private sale in 2012, when it achieved a price of £50 million.

== Background ==
Child with a Dove was painted in 1901, when Picasso was 20 years old, and was still struggling to make his mark at the start of his artistic career. Picasso first visited Paris from October to November 1900. He returned for a second spell in Paris in May 1901, to prepare for a joint exhibition in June 1901 with Francisco Iturrino at Ambroise Vollard's gallery, Galeries Vollard on rue Laffite. The exhibition was a success and Picasso's reputation as an artist began to spread. Towards the end of the year, Picasso moved away from the rapid impressionistic brushwork that had won him praise towards a flatter, abstracted presentation, with blocks of colour outlined in black, a style that is typical of his Blue Period.

== Description ==
Child with a Dove is an oil painting on canvas and measures 28.75 inches (73.0 cm) by 21.25 inches (54.0 cm). It is signed by Picasso on the centre left of the painting. It depicts a girl, with short ginger hair, wearing a white gown tied at the waist with a blue sash. The subject stands holding a white dove in both hands, beside a ball with brightly coloured segments like a colour wheel. The background is painted flatly, as an abstracted blue sky and green grass. The items in the scene, such as the girl's hair, the ball and the dove's feathers, are suggested by their shapes, yet display very little detail. The perspective is limited and implied only by the girl's arms and folds of her dress.

The work has been interpreted in several ways. It can be read as a picture of the innocence of childhood. It may be an experiment in abstraction, due to the simplified shapes and reduction of detail. It may also be regarded as a commentary or critique on colour theory, as it displays large blocks of colour; the girl's bright orange hair is set against a blue sky, and her white dress is set against green grass. With these elements, Picasso broke convention, perhaps as a way to challenge the older generation of established artists.

== Provenance ==
The painting was acquired by French art dealer Paul Rosenberg. It was bought in 1924 by a Mrs RA Workman from the Alexander Reid Gallery in Glasgow, but she sold it to Samuel Courtauld in 1928. On his death in 1947, he bequeathed it to Christabel McLaren, Lady Aberconway, wife of Henry McLaren, 2nd Baron Aberconway. After the death of Lady Aberconway, the family loaned the painting to the National Gallery from 1974 to 2010, and it was also displayed at exhibitions at the Courtauld Gallery and the Tate Gallery.

In 2012, the painting was sold in a private sale brokered by auction house Christie's on behalf of the Aberconway family. The price was reported as £50 million. The government imposed a temporary export ban which expired in December 2012 because no British institution was able to match the purchase price to acquire the work. It was displayed at an exhibition of Picasso's works from 1901 at the Courtauld Gallery until May 2013, and was expected to be exported when the Courtauld exhibition closed in May 2013. In April 2013 it was reported by Le Figaro that the buyer was the Qatar Museums Authority.

== Significance and legacy ==
Child with a Dove is considered to be the earliest example of Picasso's Blue Period (1901), presenting a simplified style and coarse brushwork that is reminiscent of Van Gogh and Gauguin. The presence of the dove is particularly significant, as it represents peace and purity. It also had a personal significance for Picasso, who watched his father José Ruiz y Blasco paint doves when Picasso was a boy.

The painting was described by Arts Council England as "probably the most famous work by Picasso in a UK collection". An Expert adviser's statement for Arts Council said, "It is a work that enjoys great public affection, providing an engaging mixture of radical brushwork, bold stylisation and charmingly sentimental subject matter.".

Lord Inglewood, chairman of the Arts Council-managed Reviewing Committee described the painting's departure from the UK as "a great shame" and said of the painting, "Child With A Dove is an iconic Picasso painting, and has a long history in British collections. It is one of Picasso's key early works, and marks a transitional moment in his career, the move into his much celebrated Blue Period".

Jonathan Jones for The Guardian summarised the significance of the painting.

In this painting, the artist who was to reveal his inner male violence in paintings of savage bullfights shows his sweet and loving side, a simple joy in life. Child with a Dove is however more revolutionary than it might seem. It has a primitive clarity no 19th-century artist was capable of. Building on the insights of Gauguin, this painting by the young Picasso – it dates from 1901, his 20th year – breaks out into a new visual language of complete boldness and human directness. The dove the child holds would of course become one of Picasso's personal additions to modern symbolism, the dove of peace he was to let fly during the Cold war.

== See also ==
- List of Picasso artworks 1901–1910
- Le petit picador jaune
- Dove (1949)
- Le pigeon aux petits pois
