= José Ruiz y Blasco =

Spanish painter (1838–1913)

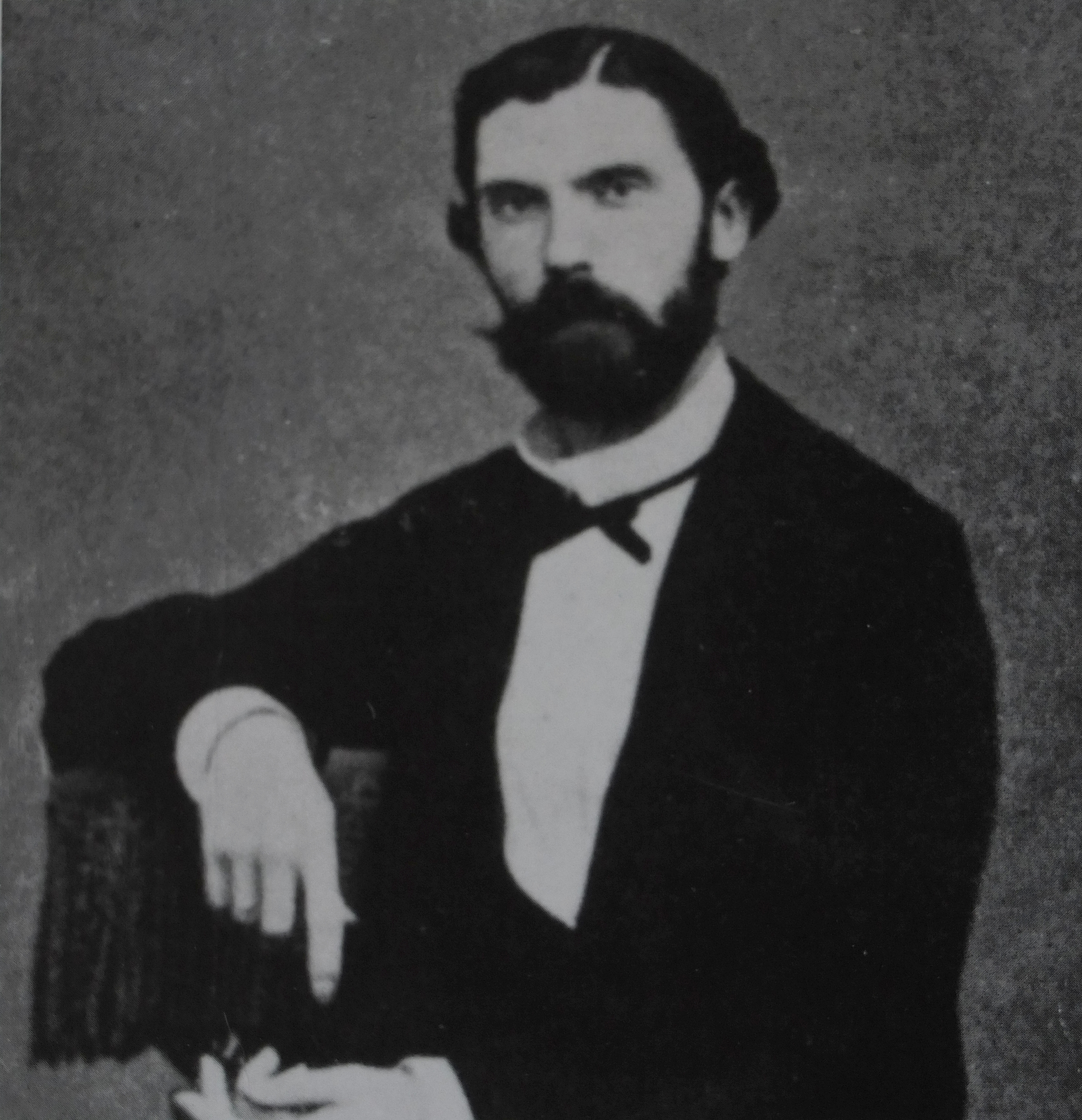
- Born: 12 April 1838; Málaga, Spain
- Died: 3 May 1913 (aged 75); Barcelona, Spain
- Occupations: Artist, art teacher
- Children: Pablo Picasso, Dolores, Concepción

Signature
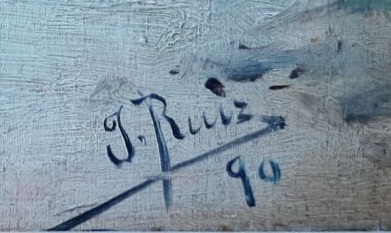

José Ruiz y Blasco (12 April 1838 – 3 May 1913) was a Spanish painter, art teacher, and the father of artist Pablo Ruiz Picasso (1881–1973).

== Family life ==
José Ruiz y Blasco (Note: nicknamed "el inglés" and "Pepe",) was born in Málaga, Spain in 1838 and grew up in a middle-class (semi bourgeois) family. Ruiz y Blasco's father was Diego Ruiz de Almoguera (1798/9-1876), his mother Maria de la Paz Blasco y Echavarria. At 42 years of age, he married María Picasso López (1855–1938), who was 17 years younger than him. The couple had three children; Pablo was born on 25 October 1881, Dolores, who was nicknamed "Lola", was born in 1884, and Concepción, who was nicknamed "Conchita", was born in 1887. When Pablo was 13 years old, Conchita died at the age of seven from diphtheria.

== Career ==
From 1875 to 1890, José Ruiz y Blasco worked as an art teacher at the Escuela Provincial de Bellas Artes San Telmo. He specialised in still lifes, landscapes, and images of doves and pigeons. He also worked as curator and restorer at the Museo Municipal in Málaga.

In 1891 Ruiz y Blasco moved his family to A Coruña and taught at the Escuela de Bellas Artes, and Pablo attended his ornamental drawing classes.

Ruiz y Blasco attempted to achieve an income from his paintings, but was unsuccessful. He exhibited his work twice in A Coruña but received lukewarm reviews, which were in contrast to the praise that his son Pablo received for his artwork. As a result, he decided to give up these aspirations.

In 1895 he moved to Barcelona and taught at the Escuela de Bellas Artes ("La Lonja").

== Influence on Picasso ==
Early in his son's life, Ruiz y Blasco recognised the artistic talent of Pablo. He began to teach him art at the age of seven. Pablo completed his first painting Le petit picador jaune at the age of eight. His father believed that the best way to learn art was to copy the great masters. In 1892, he enrolled Pablo in the Fine Arts School in Coruña, where Picasso developed his drawing skills.

At the age of 13, Pablo started to attend the Escuela de Bellas Artes in Barcelona. His father was impressed by his son's talent, but they maintained a volatile relationship. In Barcelona, Ruiz y Blasco was a model for his son's artwork and Pablo made numerous portraits of his father. Ruiz y Blasco also helped his son to create some of his artworks, including Science and Charity. He also rented a studio to help Picasso to work.

Later in life, Picasso admitted to the photographer Brassaï the reason why he painted so many bearded men: "Yes, they are all bearded, do you know why? Every time I draw a man, I accidentally think of my father. For me, the man is Don José and he will be like that all my life..."

== Death ==
Ruiz y Blasco died in Barcelona in 1913 at the age of 75.

== Gallery of paintings ==
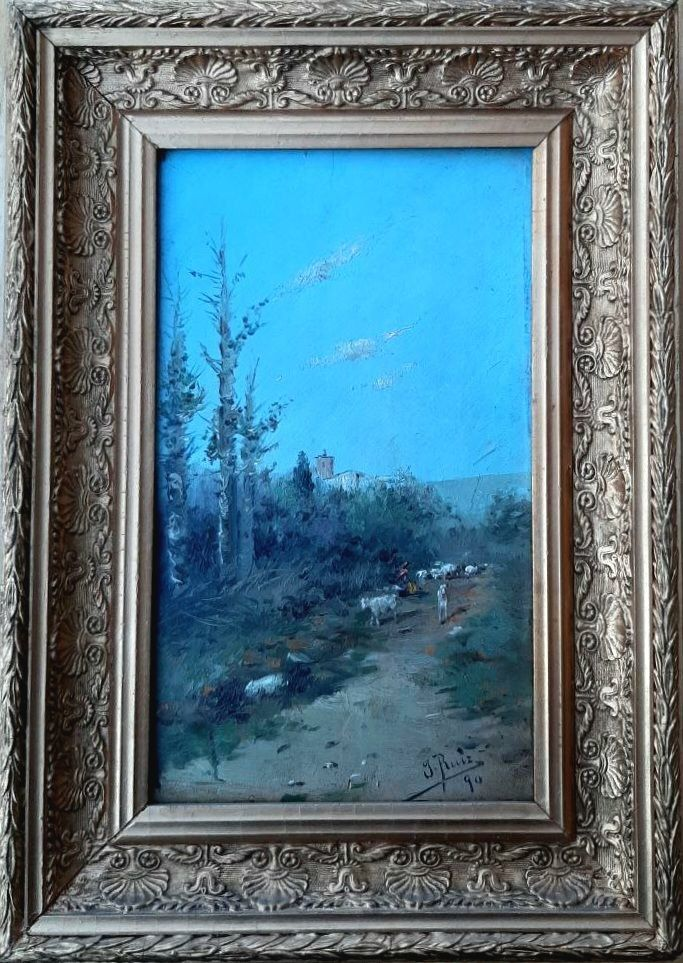
Shepherdess in the field, painted by José Ruiz y Blasco in 1890

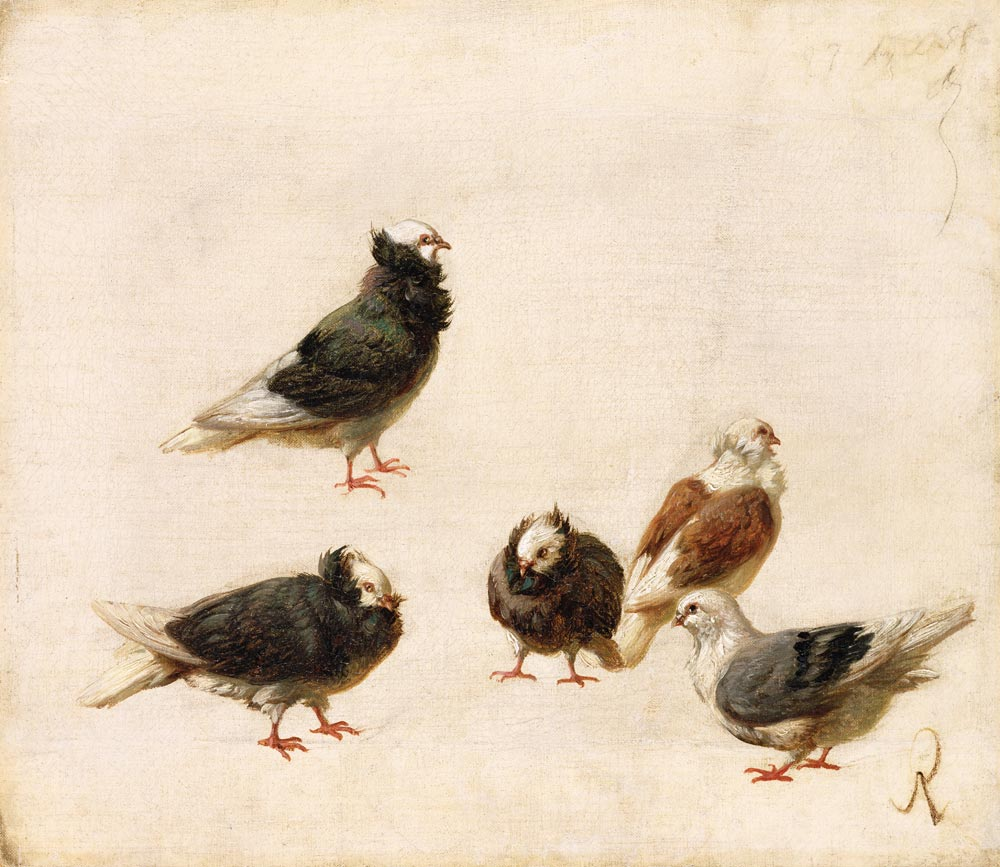
A group of doves, painted by José Ruiz y Blasco

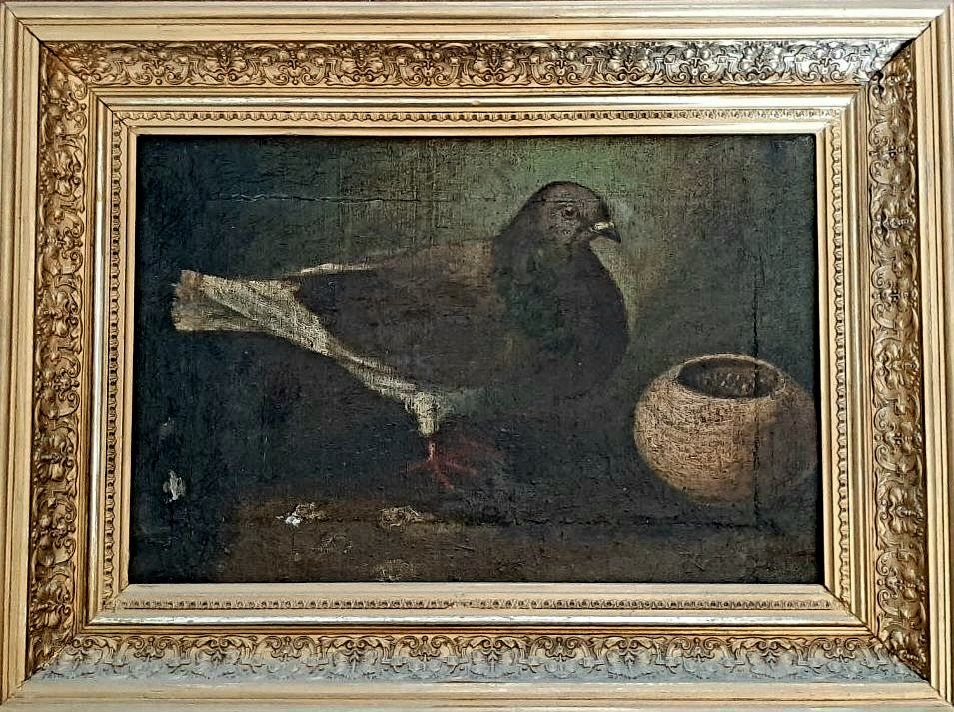
A dove, painted by José Ruiz y Blasco

== See also ==
- Dove, a 1949 lithograph by Pablo Picasso
