= Museu Picasso =

- Museo Picasso de Barcelona
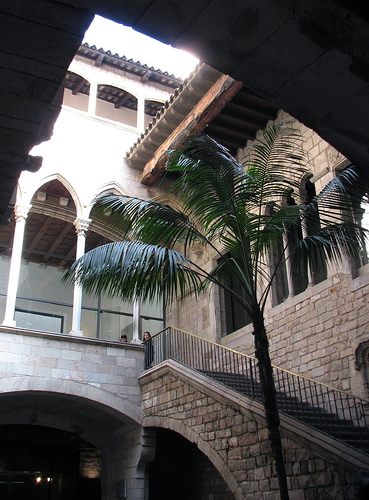

- Location within Barcelona
- Established: 9 March 1963; 63 years ago
- Location: Montcada Street, Barcelona, Spain
- Coordinates: 41.385216°N 2.180893°E
- Type: art museum
- Visitors: 1,047,094 (2023)
- Director: Emmanuel Guigon
- Curator: Malén Gual
- Website: museupicassobcn.cat

The Museu Picasso (Catalan pronunciation: [muˈzɛw piˈkasu], "Picasso Museum") is an art museum in Barcelona, in Catalonia, Spain. It houses an extensive collection of artworks by the twentieth-century Spanish artist Pablo Picasso, with a total of 4251 of his works. It is housed in five adjoining medieval palaces on Montcada Street in the La Ribera neighborhood in the Old City of Barcelona. It opened to the public on 9 March 1963, becoming the first museum dedicated to Picasso's work and the only one created during his lifetime. It has since been declared a museum of national interest by the Government of Catalonia.

Highlights of the collection include two of his first major works, The First Communion (1896), and Science and Charity (1897). In particular, the Museu Picasso reveals Picasso's relationship with the city of Barcelona, a relationship that was shaped in his youth and adolescence and continued until his death.

== History ==
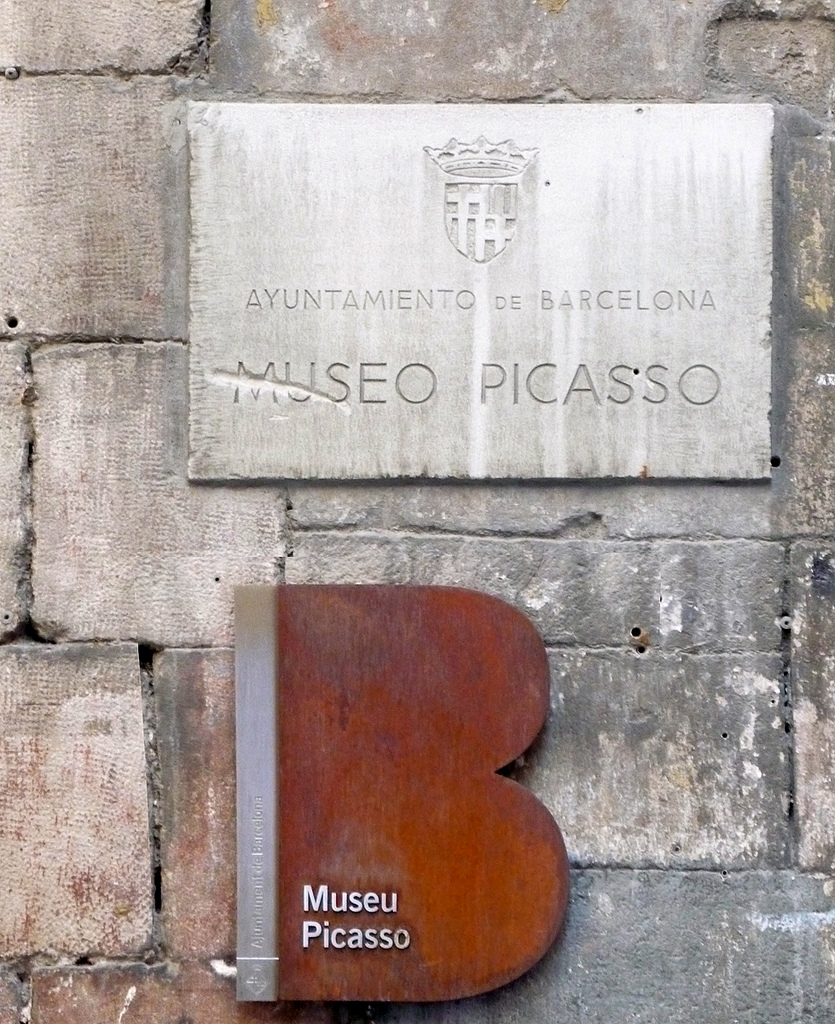
Museu Picasso, Plaque

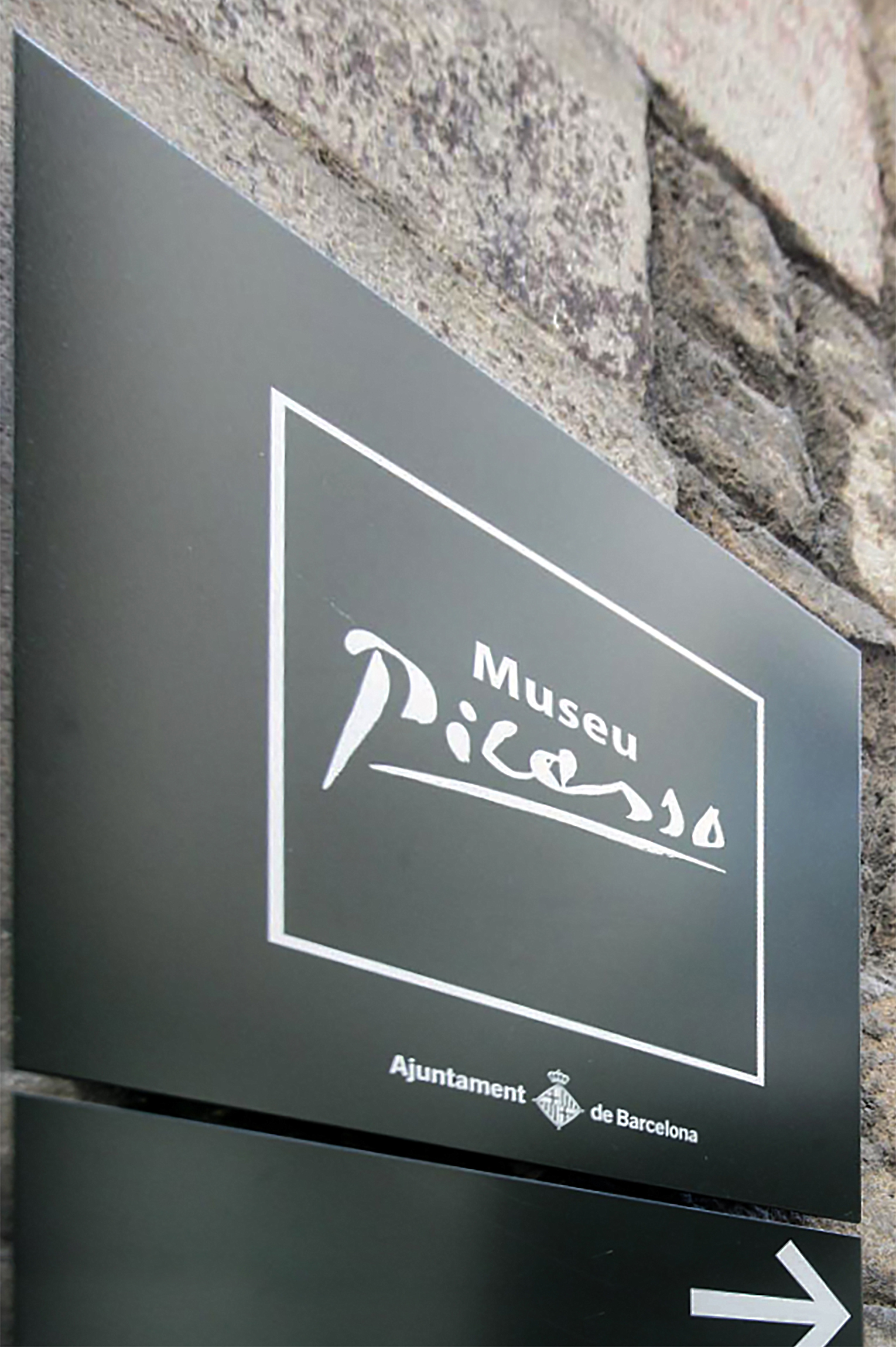
Directional sign of Museu Picasso

The original idea for the museum came from Picasso's lifelong friend and secretary, Jaume Sabartés, whom Picasso had given many paintings, drawings, and prints since meeting in 1899. Originally, Sabartés intended to found the museum in Málaga, Picasso's birthplace. It was Picasso himself who suggested that Barcelona would be more appropriate, given his long-standing connections with the city.

On 27 July 1960, Sabartés signed an agreement with the city of Barcelona to found the museum. The museum opened in 1963, with the collection established through Sabartés' donation of 574 works from his personal collection. Other items included works that Picasso had given to the city of Barcelona, such as Harlequin, works previously in the possession of the city's museum of modern art, and other gifts from Picasso's friends and collectors. The museum opened under the name of the Sabartés Collection, because of Picasso's strong opposition to Franco's regime. In the end, Barcelona mayor Josep Porcioles went against the wishes of the central government in order to open the museum. When it opened, the museum was located in Palau Aguilar on Montcada Street. In this era, the collection consisted mainly of the personal collection Sabartés, some lithographs, and posters. Other donations during the museum's first year included a book of engravings made by Picasso of Ovid's Metamorphoses, donated by Salvador Dalí, as well as a collage given by Gala Dalí, titled No, 1913. In subsequent years, the collection was expanded with donations, including 7-drawings dated between 1899 and 1904 given by Junyer Sebastian Vidal.

=== Expansion ===
After Sabartés' death in 1968, in 1970 Picasso made his last personal donation to the museum. The donation was made up of 920 varied works, including items from his early work that his family had been keeping for him ever since the time he first settled in France. These included school books, academic pieces and paintings from Picasso's Blue Period. Sabartés himself bequeathed a number of works upon his death, including a series of 58 paintings on Las Meninas. In December 1970, the museum underwent its first expansion, adding the Palau del Baró de Castellet, which is attached to the original museum building, Palau Aguilar.

As years passed, the museum grew in importance as more substantial donations were made. During the early 1980s the collection was expanded with several donations from individuals and various art galleries, as well as through acquisitions. In 1982, Picasso's widow Jacqueline Roque gave 41 pieces to the museum. In 1983, the Louise Leiris Gallery made a donation of 117 engravings. Some notable donations include those from Carles Domingo and the Editorial Gustavo Gili, among others. In 1985, the museum's physical space expanded again with the addition of Palau Meca.

During the 1990s donations included (women bust or Man sitting). The museum also acquired works such as Portrait of Jacqueline with tape, among others. In the late 1990s the museum expanded yet again with the acquisition of Casa Mauri and Palau Windows, both on the same street and adjacent to the museum. Opened in 1999, this new extension added 3,400 square meters to the museum, serving as a space for temporary exhibitions, an auditorium, and additional services. The extension was opened with the temporary exhibition Picasso: Interior and Exterior Landscape, with more than 200 works by the artist created between 1917 and 1970.

=== 21st century ===
In 2003, the museum's interior was remodeled and the artworks rearranged. Two years later, The Government of Catalonia declared the institution a museum of national interest.

In 2006, Maite Ocaña, the museum's director since 1983, resigned in order to direct the National Art Museum of Catalonia. Pepe Serra was appointed director of the Picasso in the same year. In 2008, the Museu Picasso rearranged the permanent collection and opened new rooms dedicated to engraving, including one dedicated to Sabartés. Serra has since established a network of organizations associated with Picasso, including the City of Gósol, the Centre Picasso of Horta de Sant Joan and Palau Foundation in Caldes d'Estrac, with the central aim of promoting the position of the artist by the Catalan territory. In 2009, the museum was listed as one of the 40 most visited art museums in the world by The Art Newspaper.

In 2010 the museum began a project to improve its active presence in social networks such as Twitter, Flickr, and Facebook. The museum's efforts resulted in the Museums & the Web 2010 Best of the Web award for social media. The museum's social media projects promote participatory discussion around the institution's research and knowledge.

More recently, the museum has built a new building in Sabartés square, behind Montcada Street. This expansion helped alleviate the overcrowding at the entry of the museum. The building was designed by the architect Jordi Garcés, who had completed the previous expansion of the museum.

== Architecture ==
The Museu Picasso occupies five large houses or palaces of the Carrer de Montcada Barcelona, dating from the 13th century and 14th century, occupying a total area of 10,628 sqm. The buildings follow the style of Gothic civil Catalan. Each of the 5 buildings are built following a similar pattern, around a courtyard equipped with an exterior staircase that allows access to the main floors. The buildings that house the collection of Picasso's works also have their own history.

=== Palau Aguilar ===
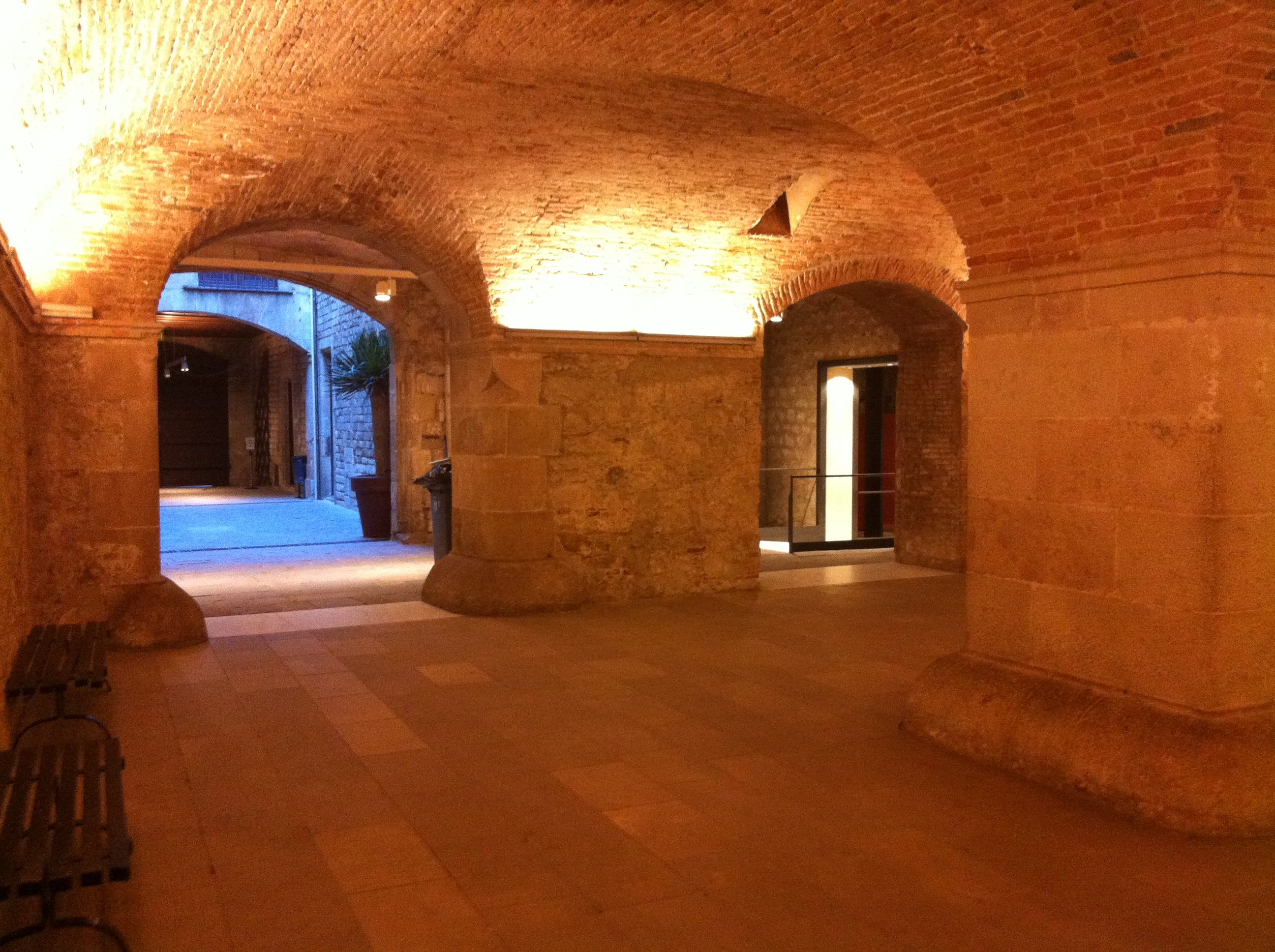
Palau Aguilar

The Palau Aguilar (Montcada, 15) was the first building occupied by the museum. The building was probably built on the residence of James Ses sources, an important character in the life of Barcelona. The building dates from the 13th century but underwent significant alterations between the 15th and 18th centuries. Between the 13th and 14th centuries the building belonged to various nobles of the Court of Aragon. It was purchased in 1386 by the bourgeois family Corominas-Desplà, who then sold it fourteen years later to Berenguer Aguilar, from which the palace is named. Later owners included several members of the Catalan bourgeoisie prior to the building's purchase by the city council on 3 November 1953.

During a restoration made in 1960, the remains of a 13th-century painting were discovered while removing plaster from one of the rooms. Today this work is exhibited in the National Art Museum of Catalonia. A large fresco representing the conquest of Majorca in 1229, the work is made up of cauldrons and roses, which suggest that the palace belonged to the lineage Caldes and Desvalls. It depicts the central courtyard of the building during the 15th century, with an open staircase and a pointed Gothic arch.

=== Palau Baró de Castellet ===
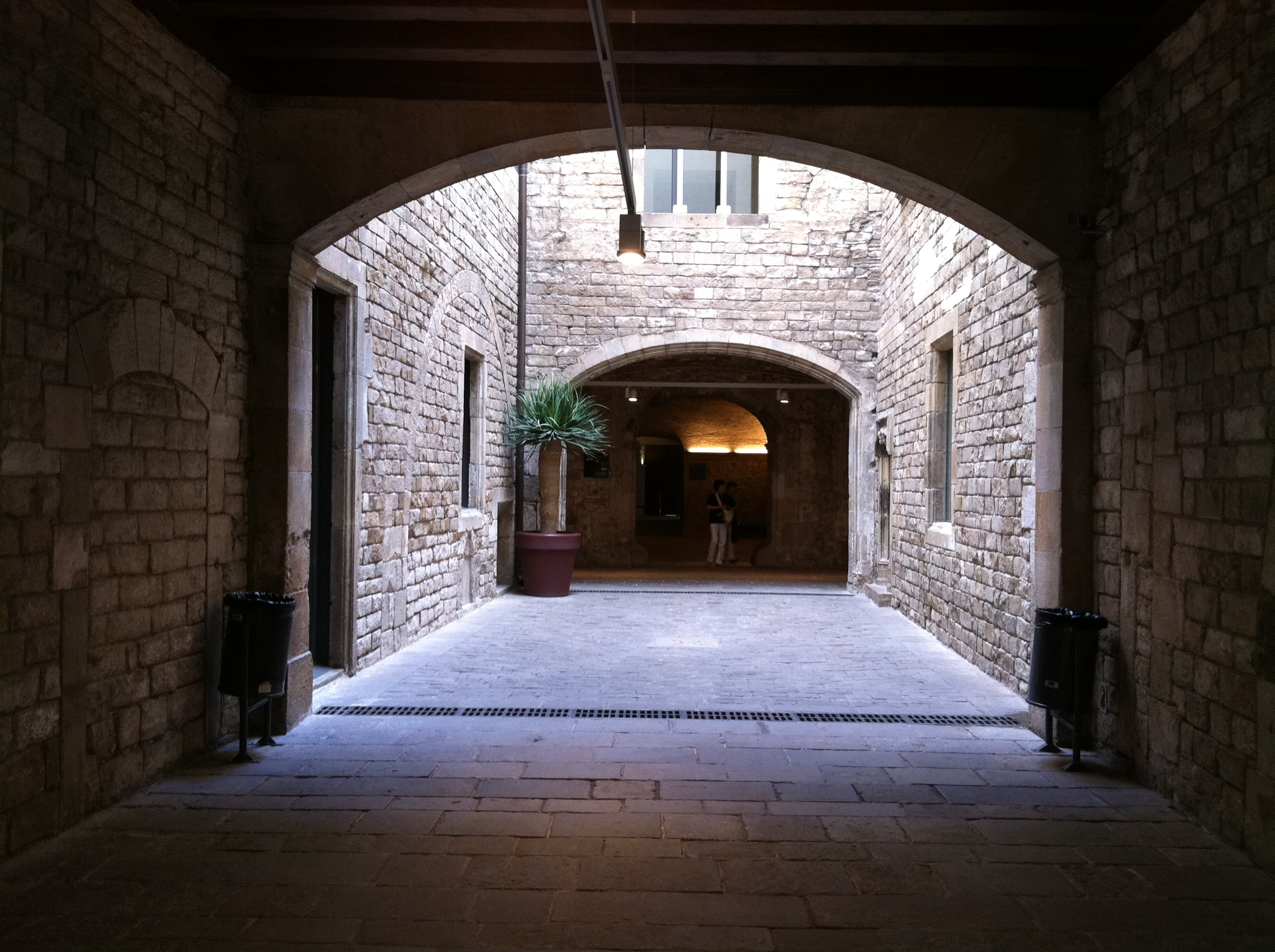
Palau Baró de Castellet

The Palau Baró de Castellet (Montcada, 17) is a palace from the medieval period. Built during the 13th century, it was owned by the Gerona family during the 15th century. Since then it has changed hands between the bourgeois and aristocratic families of Barcelona, having been remodeled during the 18th century. In 1797, the then owner (Mariano Alegre Aparici Amat) received the noble title of Baron Castle at the hands of King Charles IV, prompting the palace to receive its name. Upon the death of the Baron, the building was bequeathed to the Hospital of the Holy Cross, who rented it to different tenants until they sold it to the Rivers family. The city council then purchased the building in the 1950s. The palace was built around a central courtyard and includes on its facade a relief from the 16th century that depicts religious themes. The interior's main floor is in the neo-classical style of the mid-18th century, including elements of marble and polychrome reliefs.

=== Palau Meca ===
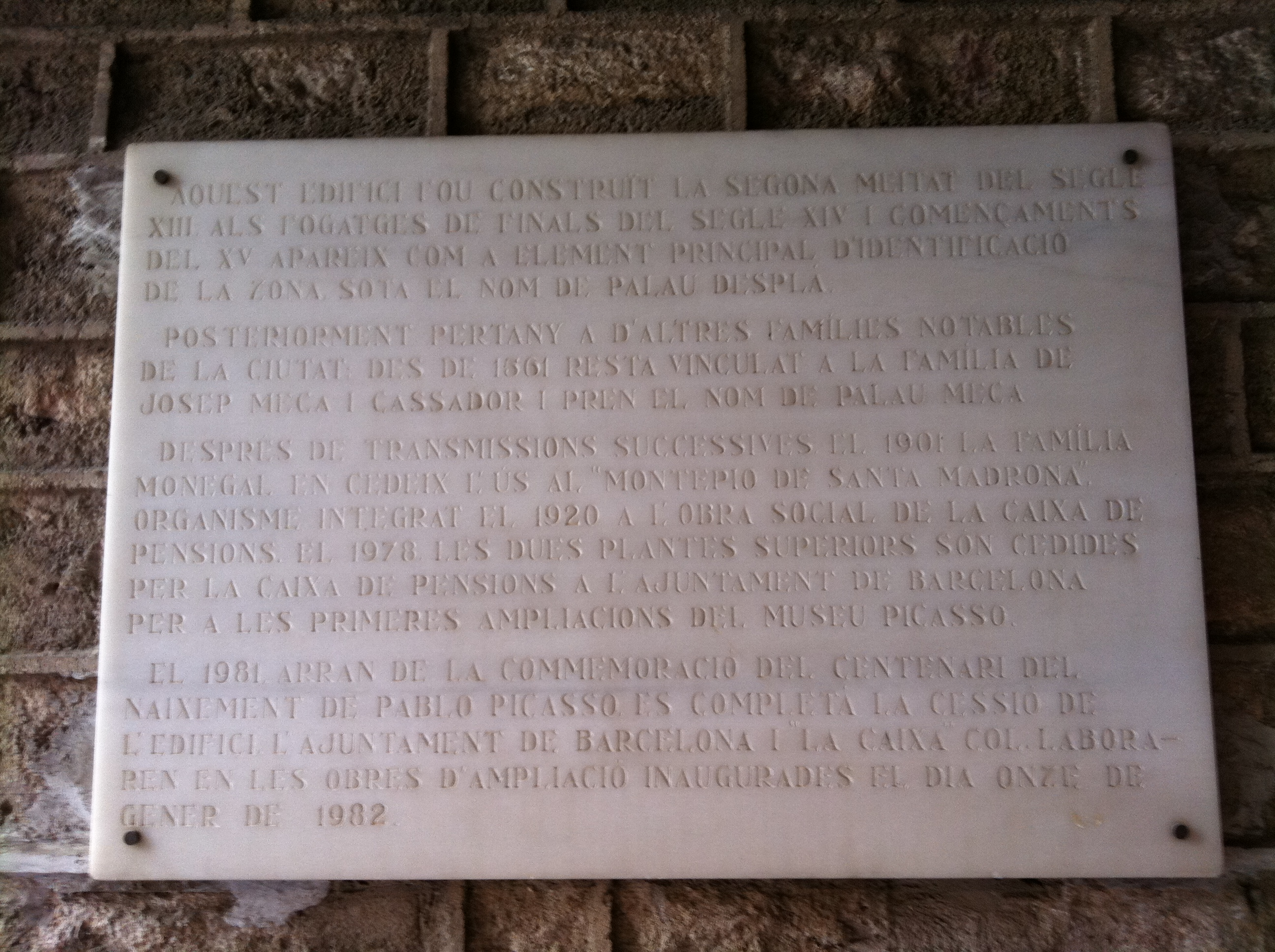
Palau Meca 1982

The Palau Meca (Montcada, 19) was built between the 13th and 14th centuries and also underwent restoration during the 18th century. Similar to the other palaces, it contains a central courtyard. Highlights include the medieval polychrome coffered ceilings of the main floor as well as unique ceilings from the 19th century. In 1349, the property was owned by James Knight, then minister of the city council. Under the ownership of his grandson, Ramon Desplà Knight, it became the largest palace on the block. The building later became the property of the family of Cassador (or Hunter), Marquis of Ciutadilla. The first owner, Joseph Mecca Hunter gave the palace its current name. The next family to own it, the Milans, restored the building after it was badly damaged during the War of Spanish Succession. In 1901, the building was given to the Brothers of Christian Doctrine and (was installed Montepío of Santa Madrona.) Over time the Montepío integrated with a bank, who gave the building to the city council on 5 December 1977. The palace was reopened as part of the museum on 11 January 1982.

=== Casa Mauri ===
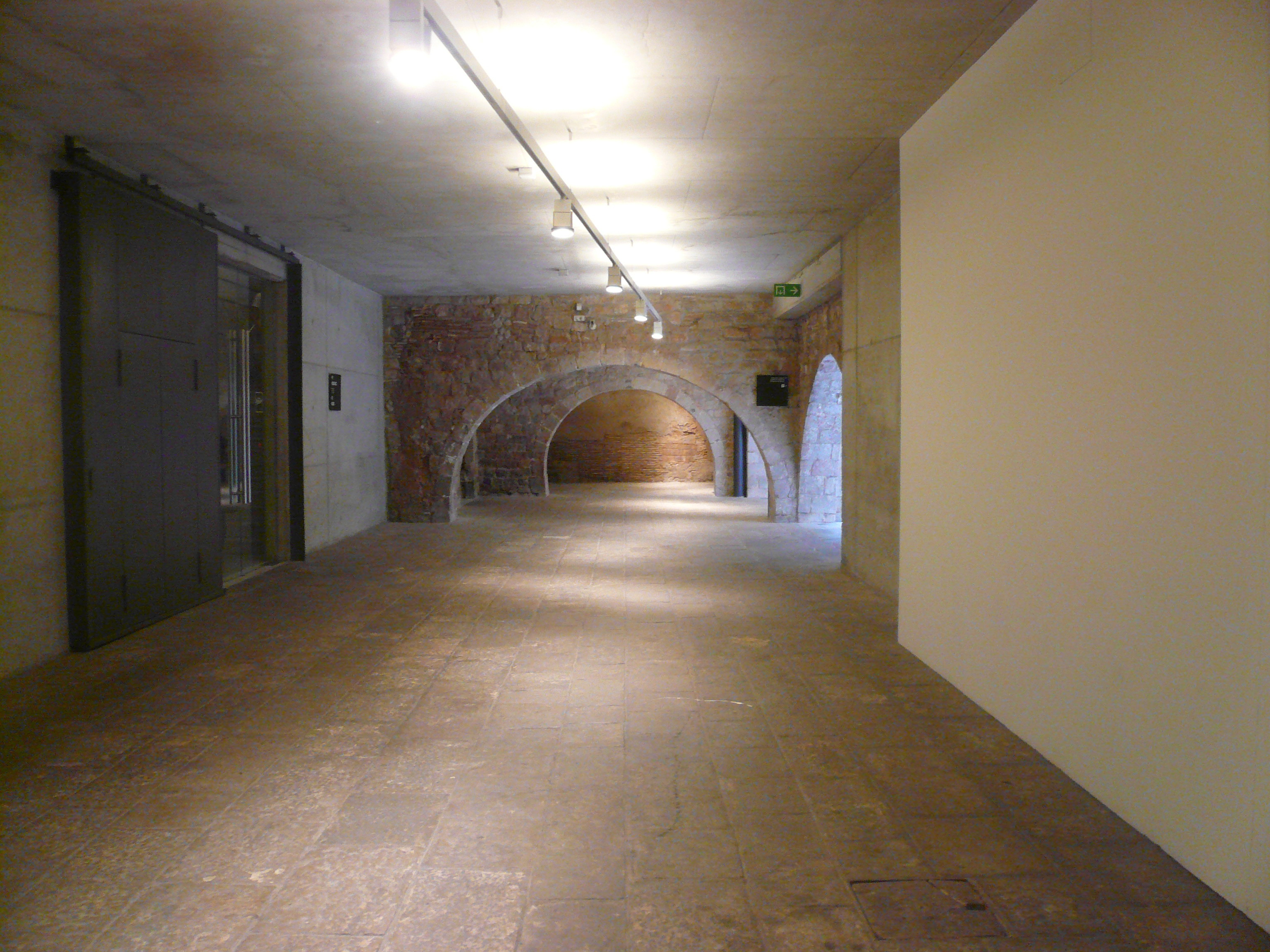
Casa Mauri

Casa Mauri (Montcada, 21) includes some structures that date from Roman times, when the space was occupied by the suburbs of Barcino. Of note is the unique wood facade, one of the few examples in Barcelona of the locking system typical of the 18th century. Between 1378 and 1516 the building was owned by the Rocha family and in 1716 it was owned by F. Casamada. During the 19th century several renovations were made. Under the owner Josep Vidal Torrents, the building was made to have industrial uses until it was bought by Mauri bakeries in 1943, the company that gave the building its name. In 1999 the building was acquired by Museu Picasso.

=== Palau Finestres ===
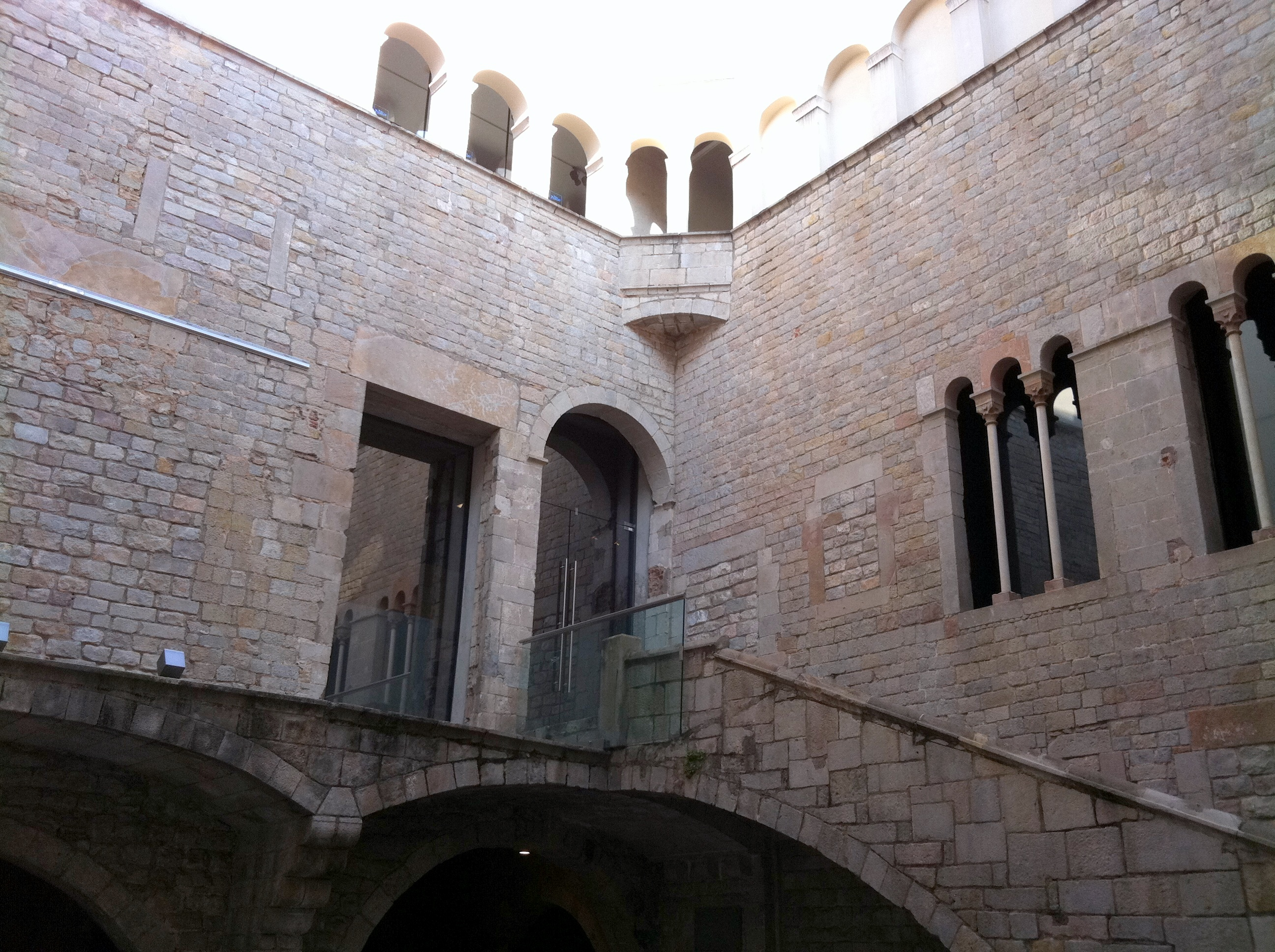
Palau Finestres, temporals entry

The Palau Finestres (Montcada, 23) was built on the foundations of a building dating to the 13th century and occupies a former Roman necropolis. Between 1363 and 1516 the area belonged to the Marimon family. In 1872, the owner of Casa Mauri, Jose Vidal Torres, bought the building in order to annex it to his home. The city acquired the building in 1970. There are arcades on the ground floor, added during the reforms of the fifteenth and 17th centuries. On the main floor, a coffered ceiling from the end of the 13th century have been restored. The building is currently used as exhibition space.

=== Knowledge and Research Center ===
The Knowledge and Research Center was opened on 17 February, a new building located in Plaza Sabartés that was designed by architect Jordi Garcés. The site aims to become an international landmark in the study of Picasso and his artistic and social context. Director Pepe Sierra explained that the space would be used for discussion, dialogue, and debate, rather than as a place of consumption. (The organization responsible for this is Silvia Domenech, commissioned between 1997 and 2007 of the Photographic Archive of Barcelona.)

Jordi Garcés, who already performed the previous expansion of the museum, designed the 1500 square meter building with a transparent glass facade protected by a cantilever. The building houses an educational center on the ground floor, with 4 multi-purpose spaces aimed at providing educational service for the museum. The first floor is devoted to the library, documentation center, and archives of the museum. The basement is devoted to visitor services. The construction began on 10 July 2009 and ended on 16 February 2011, costing 6.7 million.

== The permanent collection ==
The permanent collection is organized into three sections: painting and drawing, engraving, and ceramics. These cover principally the early years of Picasso's artistic life, such as his Blue Period from 1901 to 1904, but Picasso, his family, and his friends would bequest or loan other later pieces as well. There are now more than 3,500 works making up the permanent collection of the museum.

The collection is organized into areas that include the early years (Málaga, Corunna and Barcelona, 1890–97), the training period (Barcelona, Horta de San Juan and Madrid, 1897–1901), the Blue Period (1901–04), works in Barcelona from 1917, and the entire Las Meninas (1957) series. Most of the paintings on display at the museum are from the period between 1890 and 1917, an important collection in regard to that portion of Picasso's life. The museum has very few paintings after 1917, with the exception of the Las Meninas, painted in 1957. The collection of lithographs comprises the years 1962 and 1982. Picasso himself gave the museum a copy of each of his works produced after the death of Sabartés in 1968. The collection also includes illustrations made by the artist for various books, as well as ceramics gifted to the museum by Picasso's widow, Jacqueline.

Between 2009 and 2010 the museum began making information on the permanent collection public on their website. As of October 2010, over 65% of the museum's collection was available to view online.

== Exhibitions ==
The Picasso Museum has carried out dozens of exhibitions since it opened. Often, these exposures are related to the figure of the painter or topics related to their environment, trying to research and review the work and studies of the painter from Málaga. It has also held exhibitions on the relationship between Picasso and other artists, such as Picasso vs. Rusiñol held in 2010. Sometimes also organized a traveling exhibition, and Bullfighting. Paintings, drawings and prints in the collection of the Museu Picasso which could be seen at the Casa Lis in Salamanca in 2010. Also made small exhibition focused on one topic, called displays, such as analyzing the painting Science and Charity, the results of studies showing radiographic and reflectologia or another that analyzes a statement that was made about Picasso in Barcelona 1936, Room Esteva. Picasso Exhibition, 1936.

The Museu Picasso frequently hosts special exhibitions presenting artworks by Picasso and other artists. From time to time, the museum also organizes seminars and lectures on subjects related to Picasso or on museological issues of interest given by specialists from throughout the world.

== Directors ==
1. Joan Ainaud Lasarte (1963–1966)
2. Rosa Maria Subirana (1966–1983)
3. Maria Teresa Ocaña (1983–2007)
4. Pepe Serra (2007–2011)
5. Bernardo Laniano Romero (2012–2016)
6. Emmanuel Guigon (2016-)

== See also ==
- Musée Picasso (Paris)
- Museo Picasso Málaga
- List of single-artist museums
