= Le petit picador jaune =

Painting by Pablo Picasso

- The little yellow bullfighter (English)
- Artist: Pablo Picasso
- Year: 1889
- Medium: oil paint on wood
- Dimensions: 24 x 19 cm

Le petit picador jaune (English: The little yellow bullfighter) is an oil on wood painting by the Spanish artist Pablo Picasso, which he created in 1889 at the age of eight. It is considered to be the earliest known surviving work by the artist. The painting is a colourful representation of a Spanish bullfight, a subject which Picasso repeatedly returned to throughout his career.

== Background ==
Picasso began to develop his artistic skills from an early age. His first art teacher was his father, José Ruiz y Blasco, whose nickname was "Pepe". He worked as a teacher at the Malaga School of Fine Arts and also as curator at the city's municipal museum. Picasso's father had great influence on his son, particularly in relation to his developing artistic skills. Picasso would watch his father paint and they often visited the museum together. Picasso’s early artistic skills are evident in this painting, which was created before he had received any formal art training. Picasso would later state, "I never drew like a child. When I was 12, I drew like Raphael". When Picasso’s training as an artist began, he was put to work on interior decorative painting, where he painted pigeons’ legs. Picasso’s father soon noticed his son’s talent and decided to enrol him in The Barcelona Academy of Art. There the now thirteen-year-old Picasso created a drawing for the entrance exam within the course of a day, a task that would normally take an entire month. By 1894, Picasso had developed his skills and had begun his career as an artist. By this point, he had already been inspired by the work of other Spanish masters, like Diego Velázquez and Francisco Goya. However, he decided to relocate to Paris after making his first trip in 1900 and would spend most of his adult life there.

== Description ==
Le petit picador jaune is considered to be the earliest known painting by Picasso, having been painted at 8 years old. The painting depicts a bullfight, an activity which Picasso was already attending at age seven. The young Picasso painted the image after attending a bullfight in Malaga’s La Malagueta bullring in 1889.

The painting is small in size, measuring just 24 cm x 19 cm. The composition is of a bullfighter on horseback, dressed in bright yellow, who is the focus of the scene, with three spectators standing outside the bullring. The image displays an element of playfulness and comic caricature in its representation of the subject.

Le petit picador jaune contains elements that influenced the artist in childhood and would continue to preoccupy him throughout his adult artistic career. The subject matter of bulls and bullfighting is a prominent aspect of Picasso's Spanish heritage, and a theme that Picasso returned to on repeated occasions in his work. Picasso maintained a fascination for bullfighting and would regularly visit the arenas in the South of France later in life. The violence that the young Picasso would have witnessed at the bullring in childhood was a recurring element of his work, not least of all in his 1937 painting Guernica, in which the presence of a bull has been interpreted as a symbol of death. In Le petit picador jaune, the artist's primary motive was to depict the spectacle of the event and the drama of the scene, yet in his later adult works, the bull would be used to convey other themes, such as eroticism and emotion, which were influenced by biographical events.

Another recurring motif in this painting is the presence of a horse, a subject which appears time and again throughout Picasso's work right through to his later years in the 1960s, including Guernica. In Picasso's art, the horse represented many meanings, including being both a noble and grotesque symbol. Horses can be seen depicted in many of his subsequent works, including Boy Leading a Horse (1906), Naked Horseman (1919), The Rape (1920), and Bullfight (1934).

== Significance and legacy ==
Although Picasso left Madrid to start a new life in Paris, he never forgot his Spanish heritage. His experiences of watching the bullfights in Madrid at an early age made a lasting impression on him and he maintained a life-long obsession with bullfighting. The character of the matador was a subject that he continually returned to and was an important symbol of his Spanish heritage. For Picasso, the bullfight embodied a public display of violence, bravery and skill. Picasso was particularly attracted to the subject due to its powerful contradictions of grace and brutality, entertainment and tragedy, and life and death. In A Picasso Bestiary, Neil Cox and Deborah Povey remarked on the influence of bullfighting on the work of Picasso. "The bullfight was, of course, immensely important to Picasso. The play of domination and subjugation, grandeur and pathos which characterises his pictures of bulls and their Cretan cousin the Minotaur, is essentially a product of that almost religious intensity of the rituals of the ring."

Picasso's friend and biographer, John Richardson, who attended the bullring with Picasso, said that the crowds at the bullfights were "screaming and clapping and cheering and Picasso just sat there, absolutely still, not making any sound but just taking it all in. Occasionally he would make a remark." He also said of the painting, "It is amazing to see all what comes out of that early image. We haven't got anything else from that date, it was something he always hung on to. It is fascinating to see what came out of it."

Helen Newman, Global Co-Head of Sotheby's Impressionist & Modern Art Department & Chairman of Sotheby's Europe, commented on Picasso's depictions of the bullfight, "Through the subject of the bullfight, Picasso explores the theme of life and death, creation and destruction, earth and sun, casting himself at the centre stage of the spectacle."

== Exhibition ==
In 2017, the painting was featured in the exhibition Picasso: Minotaurs and Matadors at the Gagosian Gallery in London.

== See also ==
- Guernica
- Picasso's Blue Period
- Picasso's Rose Period
- Cubism
- List of Picasso artworks 1889–1900
