= Krug (surname) =

Krug is a German surname meaning jug, and therefore it is an occupational surname based on occupation of a jug/mug seller/manufacturer or of an innkeeper. Notable people with the surname include:

- Adam Krug (born 1991), American ice hockey player
- Anita K. Krug, American legal scholar and academic administrator
- Arnold Krug (1849–1904), German composer
- Barbara Krug (born 1956), German athlete
- Charles Krug (1825–1892), founder of the first winery in Napa Valley, California
- Diederich Krug (1821–1880), German pianist and composer
- Edward A. Krug (1911–1979), American education historian
- Etienne Krug, Belgian physician and epidemiologist
- Frederick Krug (1855–1930), German founder of Krug Brewery and Krug Park in Omaha, Nebraska
- Hellmut Krug (born 1956), German football referee
- Jessica Krug, professor of history who revealed in 2020 that she had falsely pretended to have Afro-Caribbean heritage
- Johann-Joseph Krug (1800–1866), German founder of Champagne Krug (Champagnerhauses Krug)
- Judith Krug (1940–2009), American librarian
- Julius Albert Krug (1907–1970), American Secretary of the Interior under President Harry Truman
- Karl Wilhelm Leopold Krug (1833–1898), German botanist
- Lilly Krug (born 2001), German actress
- Ludwig Krug (1488-1532), German goldsmith, engraver, and sculptor
- Manfred Krug (1937–2016), German writer and actor
- Marty Krug (1888–1966), German baseball player
- Mikhail Krug (1962–2002), Russian singer
- Róger Krug Guedes (born 1996), Brazilian footballer
- Shirley Krug (born 1958), American politician
- Spencer Krug (born 1977), Canadian musician
- Steve Krug (born 1950), a user-interface and user-experience designer
- Torey Krug (born 1991), American ice hockey player
- Wilhelm Traugott Krug (1770–1842), German philosopher

== See also ==
- Krug (disambiguation)
- Crug (disambiguation)
