= Guernica =

Guernica Gernika Guernica y Luno
- City
- Gernika-Lumo
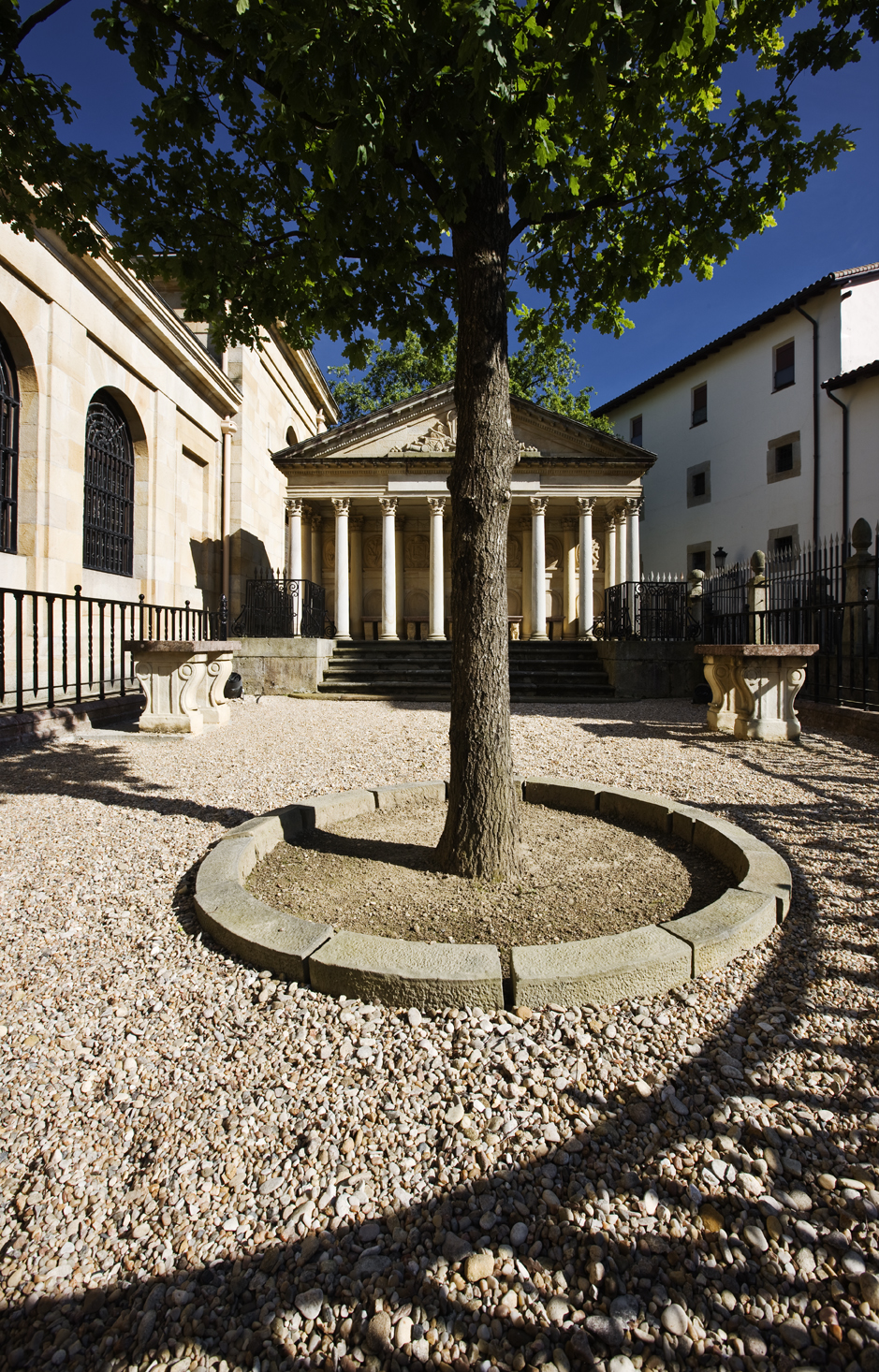
- The Oak of Gernika (Gernikako Arbola)

- Flag Coat of arms

- Location of Guernica within the Basque Country Location of Guernica within Spain
- Coordinates: 43°19′N 02°40′W
- Country: Spain
- Autonomous community: Basque Country
- Province: Biscay
- Eskualdea / Comarca: Busturialdea
- Founded: April 28, 1366

Government
  - Mayor: Jose Maria Gorroño Etxebarrieta (EAJ-PNV)

Area
  - Total: 8.6 km^{2} (3.3 sq mi)
- Elevation (AMSL): 10 m (33 ft)

Population (2025-01-01)
  - Total: 17,129
  - Density: 2,000/km^{2} (5,200/sq mi)
- Demonym: gernikarra
- Time zone: UTC+1 (CET)
  - Summer (DST): UTC+2 (CEST)
- Postal code: 48300
- Area code: +34 (Spain)
- Website: Official website

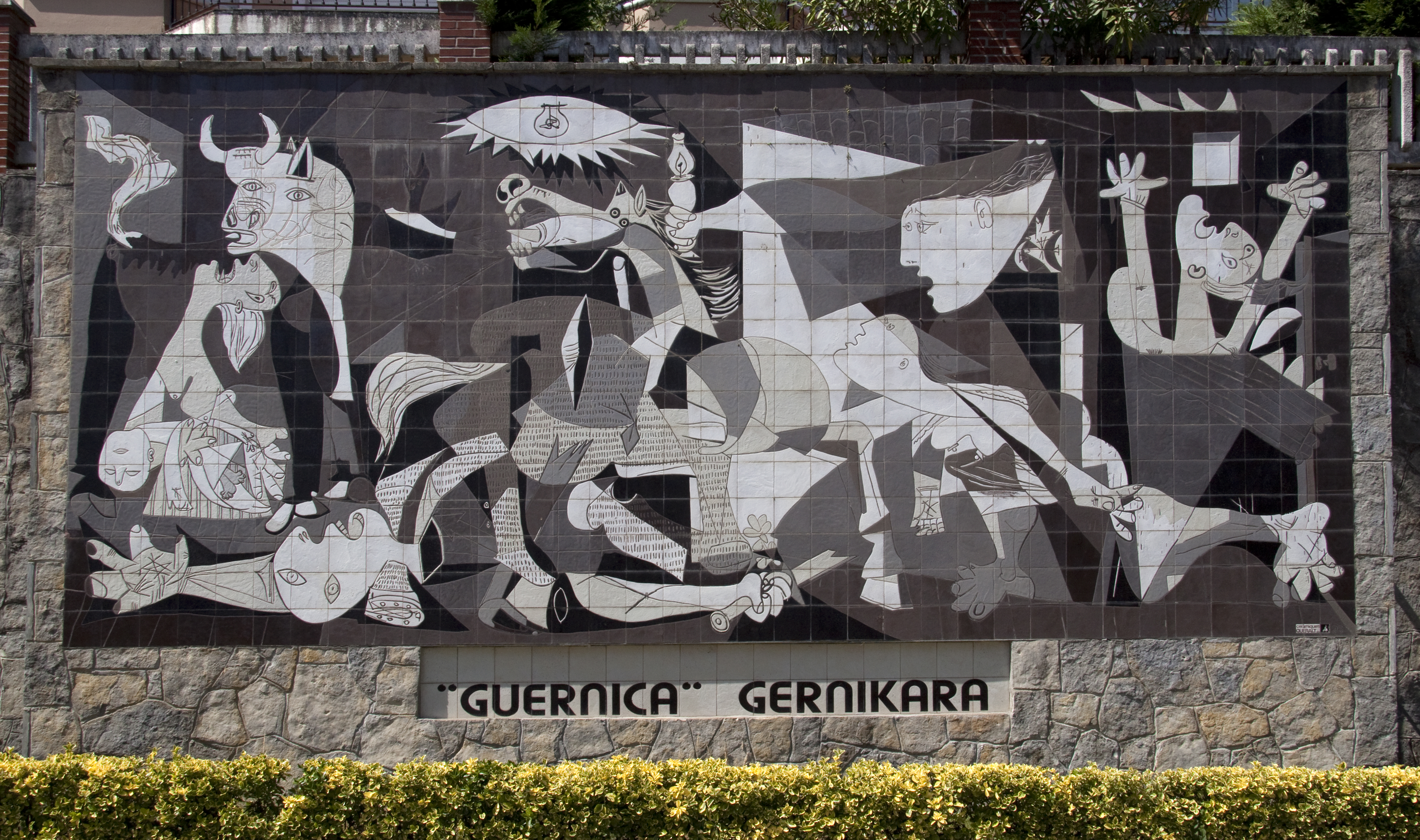
Tiled wall in Guernica, the inscription below, written in Basque, expresses the desire to have the Picasso painting of the same name transferred to the city (it is currently exhibited in the Museo Reina Sofía).

Guernica (/ɡərˈniːkə, ˈɡɜːrnɪkə/, Spanish pronunciation: [ɡeɾˈnika]), officially Gernika (pronounced [ɡernika]) in Basque, is a town in the province of Biscay, in the Autonomous Community of the Basque Country, Spain. The town of Guernica is one part (along with neighbouring Lumo) of the municipality of Gernika-Lumo (Spanish: Guernica y Luno), whose population was 17,033 as of 2024.

On April 26, 1937, Guernica was bombed by Nazi Germany's Condor Legion and Fascist Italy's Aviazione Legionaria, in one of the first aerial bombings. The attack inspired Pablo Picasso's painting Guernica, depicting his outrage at the attack.

== Location ==
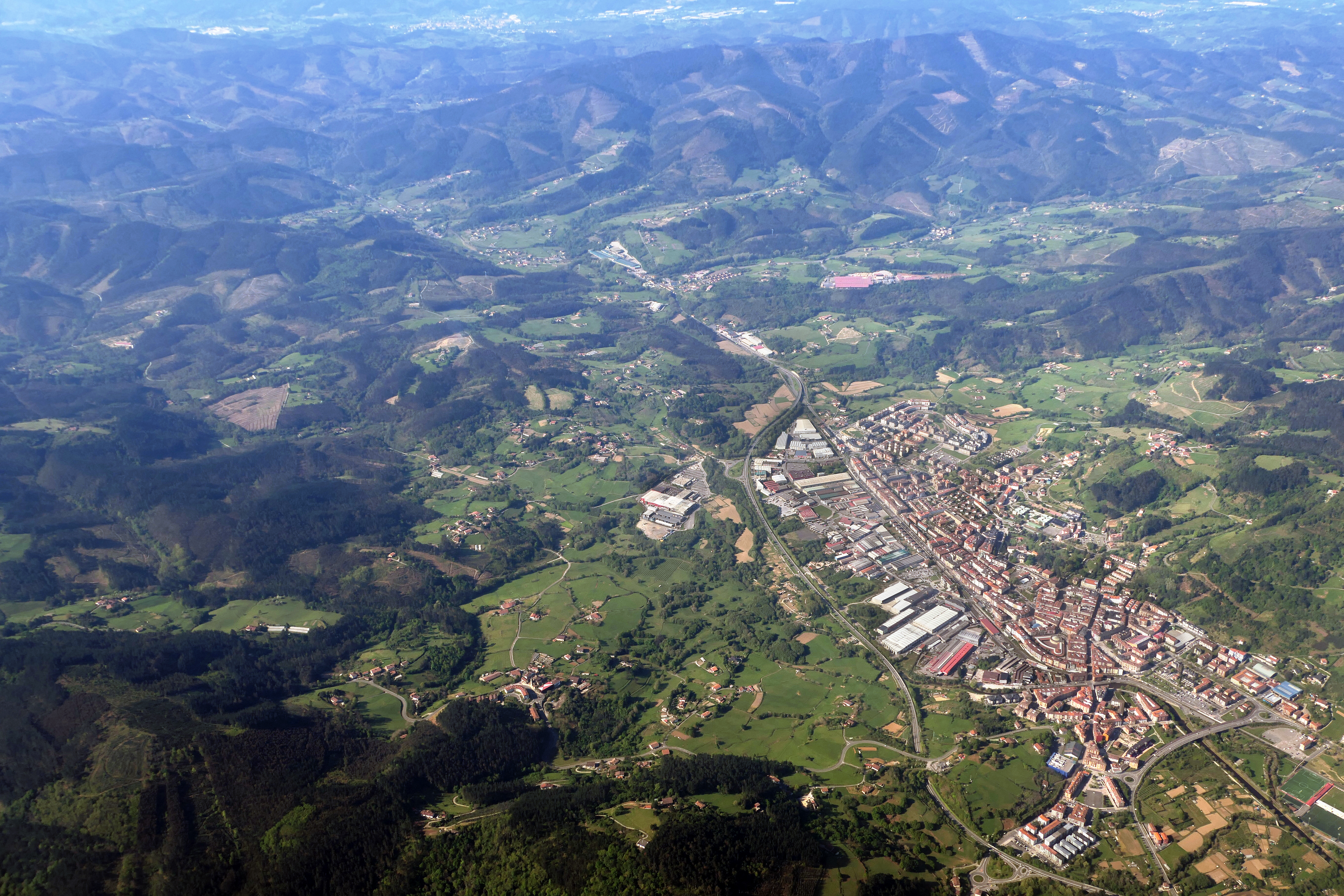
An aerial view looking south.

The village is situated in the region of Busturialdea, in the valley of the Oka River. The river ends in an estuary that gives its name to the village of Guernika. Its mouth is known as the Urdaibai's estuary's heart.

== History ==
=== 1366–1936 ===
The town of Guernica was founded by Tello Alfonso, Lord of Biscay, on April 28, 1366, at the intersection of the road from Bermeo to Durango with the road from Bilbao to Elantxobe and Lekeitio. The strategic importance of the site was increased by the fact that it lay on a major river estuary, where vessels could dock at the port of Suso.

In time, it took on the typical shape of a Basque town, comprising a series of parallel streets (Goienkale, Azokekale, Artekale and Barrenkale; respectively: ‘upper, market, between, lower roads’) and a transverse street called Santa María, with a church at each end of the built-up area.

Life in the town became rigidly structured, with the aim being to preserve the privileges of the dominant middle classes. This pattern continued practically unaltered until the late 17th century.

On a small hillock in the town, stands the Meeting House and the Tree of Gernika. By ancient tradition, Basques, and indeed other peoples in medieval Europe, held assemblies under a tree. In Slavic populations gathering under trees to discuss matters affecting the community is millennia old as trees, especially oaks, also held special roles and were regarded as holy or held the functions of deities. The tradition of protecting and caring for trees is alive even today in many Slavic countries across Europe.

In Biscay, each administrative district (known as a merindad) had its appointed tree, but over the centuries, the Tree of Guernica acquired particular importance. It stood in the parish of Lumo, on a site known as Gernikazarra, beside a small shrine. Guernica is an important and the symbolic town in the Basque Country and in Spain.

The laws of Biscay continued to be drawn up under this tree until 1876, with each town and village in the province sending two representatives to the sessions, known as General Assemblies. This early form of democracy was recorded by the philosopher Rousseau, by the poet William Wordsworth, by the dramatist Tirso de Molina and by the composer Iparragirre, who wrote the piece called Gernikako Arbola (Basque for The Tree of Gernika).

When the Domain of Biscay was incorporated into the kingdom of Castile, the king of Castile visited Guernica and swore an oath under the Tree promising to uphold the fueros or local laws of Biscay. The oath of King Ferdinand, known as the "Catholic Monarch", on June 30, 1476, is depicted in a painting by Francisco de Mendieta popularly known as "El besamanos" ("The Royal audience"). On July 3, 1875, during the Carlist Wars, the pretender to the throne, Don Carlos, also visited Guernica and swore the oath. Throughout the 19th century, there were frequent meetings under the Tree, including both General Assemblies and other political events.

By the 18th century, there was a square at the centre of the town, flanked by the town hall, a public gaol housing prisoners from all over the Lordship of Biscay, a hospital and a poor-house for local people. Day-to-day life comprised agriculture (growing of cereals, vegetable and fruit), crafts (menders, tailors, cobblers, flax manufacturers) and trade (transportation and sale of goods and produce).

This was also a time of continual conflicts with the neighbouring parish of Lumo over disputed land. These disputes were not finally settled until 1882, when the two parishes joined to form Gernika-Lumo.

The first industrial factories were set up in the early years of the 20th century. This encouraged population growth, and the town grew from 4,500 inhabitants in 1920 to around 7,000 in 1936.

=== Civil War: 1937 bombing ===
On April 26, 1937, during the Spanish Civil War, Guernica was the scene of a massive aerial bombing attack by the Condor Legion of Nazi Germany's Luftwaffe and the Italian Aviazione Legionaria. According to official Basque figures, 1,654 civilians were killed. The raid was requested by Francisco Franco to aid in his overthrowing the Basque Government and the Spanish Republican government. The town was devastated, though the Biscayan assembly and the Oak of Guernica survived. The Bombing of Guernica, which went on continuously for three hours, is considered the beginning of the Luftwaffe doctrine of terror bombing civilian targets in order to demoralize the enemy.

==== In art ====
Pablo Picasso painted his Guernica painting to commemorate the horrors of the bombing and René Iché made a violent sculpture the day after the bombing. It has inspired musical compositions by Octavio Vazquez (Gernika piano trio), René-Louis Baron, Lenny White, and Mike Batt (performed by Katie Melua), and poems by Paul Eluard (Victory of Guernica), and Uys Krige (Nag van die Fascistiese Bomwerpers; English translation from the Afrikaans: Night of the Fascist Bombers). There is also a short film from 1950, by Alain Resnais, titled Guernica.

Celebrations were staged in 1966 to mark the 600th anniversary of the founding of the town. As part of these celebrations, a statue of Count Tello, made by local sculptor Agustín Herranz, was set up in the Fueros Square.

=== 21st century ===
As of 2009, Gernika-Lumo had 16,244 inhabitants. It is a town with a prosperous service sector, and is also home to industrial companies, as well as good cultural and educational amenities.

== Cultural importance ==
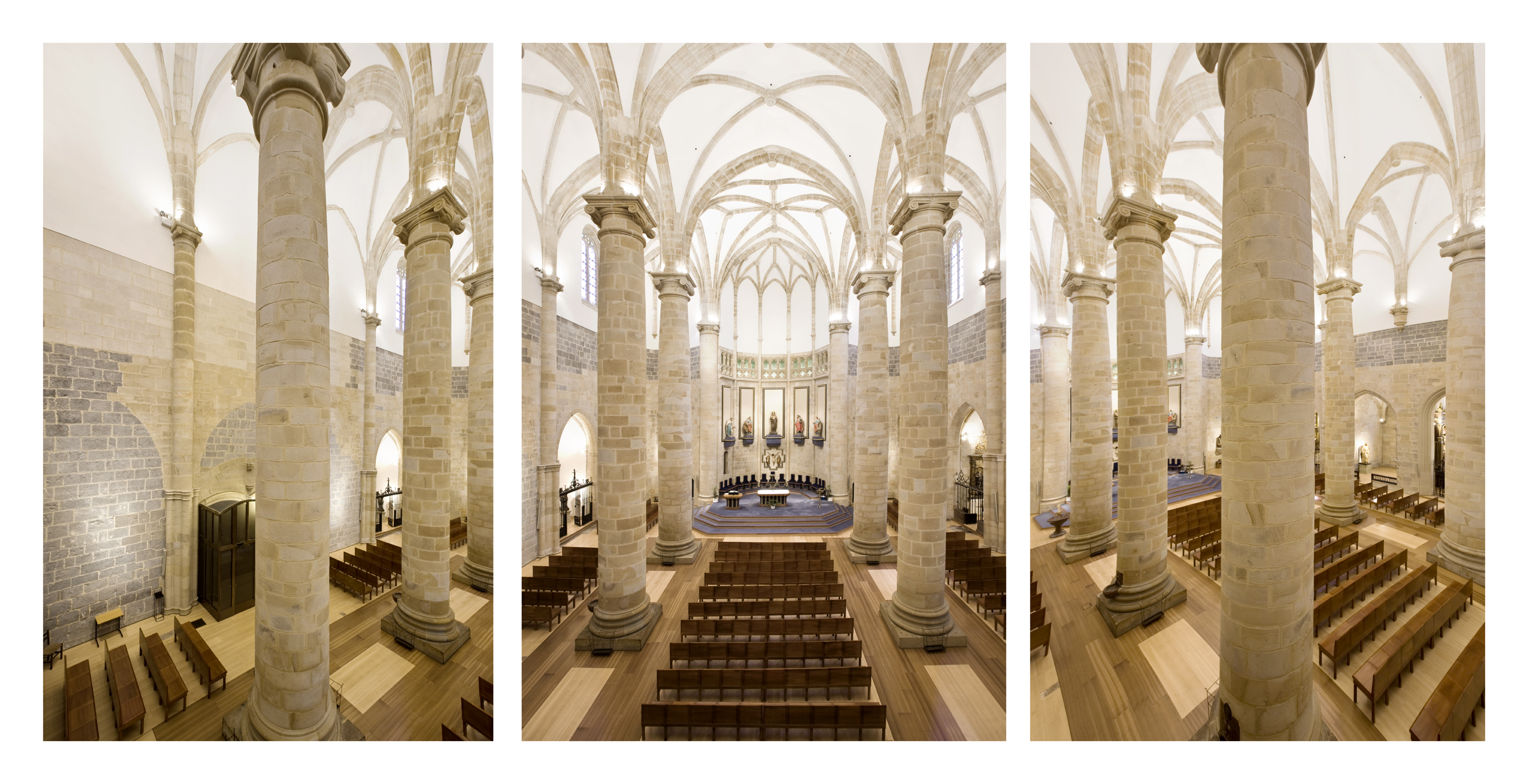
Santa María Church

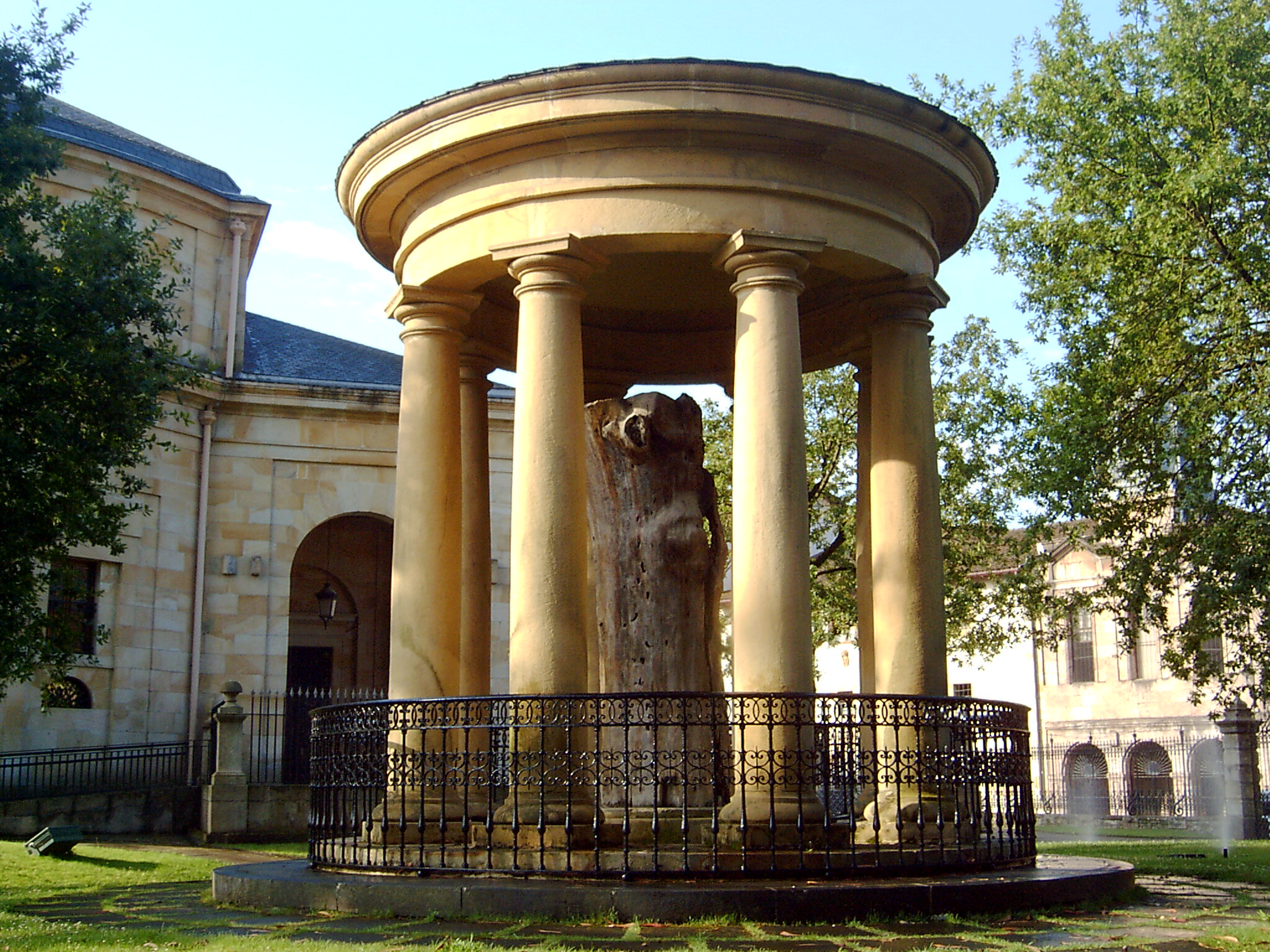
The "Old Tree" of Guernica inside its tholos

Guernica is historically the seat of the parliament of the province of Biscay, whose executive branch is located in nearby Bilbao.

In prior centuries, Lumo had been the meeting place of the traditional Biscayan assembly, Urduña and chartered towns like Guernica were under the direct authority of the Lord of Biscay, and Enkarterri and the Durango area had separate assemblies. All would hold assemblies under local big trees. As time passed, the role of separate assemblies was superseded by the single assembly in Guernica, and by 1512, its oak, known as the Gernikako Arbola, became symbolic of the traditional rights of the Basque people as a whole.

The trees are always renewed from their own acorns. One of these trees (the "Old Tree") lived until the 19th century, and may be seen, as a dry stump, near the assembly house. A tree planted in 1860 to replace it died in 2004 and was in turn replaced; the sapling that had been chosen to become the official Oak of Guernica is also sick so the tree will not be replaced until the earth around the site has been restored to health.

A hermitage was built beside the Gernikako Arbola to double as an assembly place, followed by the current house of assembly (Biltzar Jauregia in Basque), built in 1826.

== Symbol for peace ==
On April 26, 1937, during the Spanish Civil War, the town was razed to the ground by German aircraft belonging to the Condor Legion, sent by Hitler to support Franco's troops. For almost four hours bombs rained down on Guernica in an "experiment" for the blitzkrieg tactics and bombing of civilians seen in later wars.

In 1987 the 50th anniversary of the bombing was commemorated as the town hosted the Preliminary Congress of the World Association of Martyr Cities. The full congress was held subsequently in Madrid, bringing together representatives of cities all over the world. Since then, Gernika-Lumo has been a member of this association. 1988 saw the setting up of the monument Gure Aitaren Etxea, by Basque sculptor Eduardo Chillida, and in 1990 Large Figure in a Shelter, by British sculptor Henry Moore, was erected beside it. These monuments are symbolic of Gernika-Lumo as a city of peace.

As part of the "Symbol for Peace" movement, Gernika has twinned with several towns, including Berga (Catalonia – 1986), Pforzheim (Germany – 1988) and Boise, Idaho (United States – 1993). The twinning agreements include co-operation in the fields of culture, education and industry.

== Market day ==
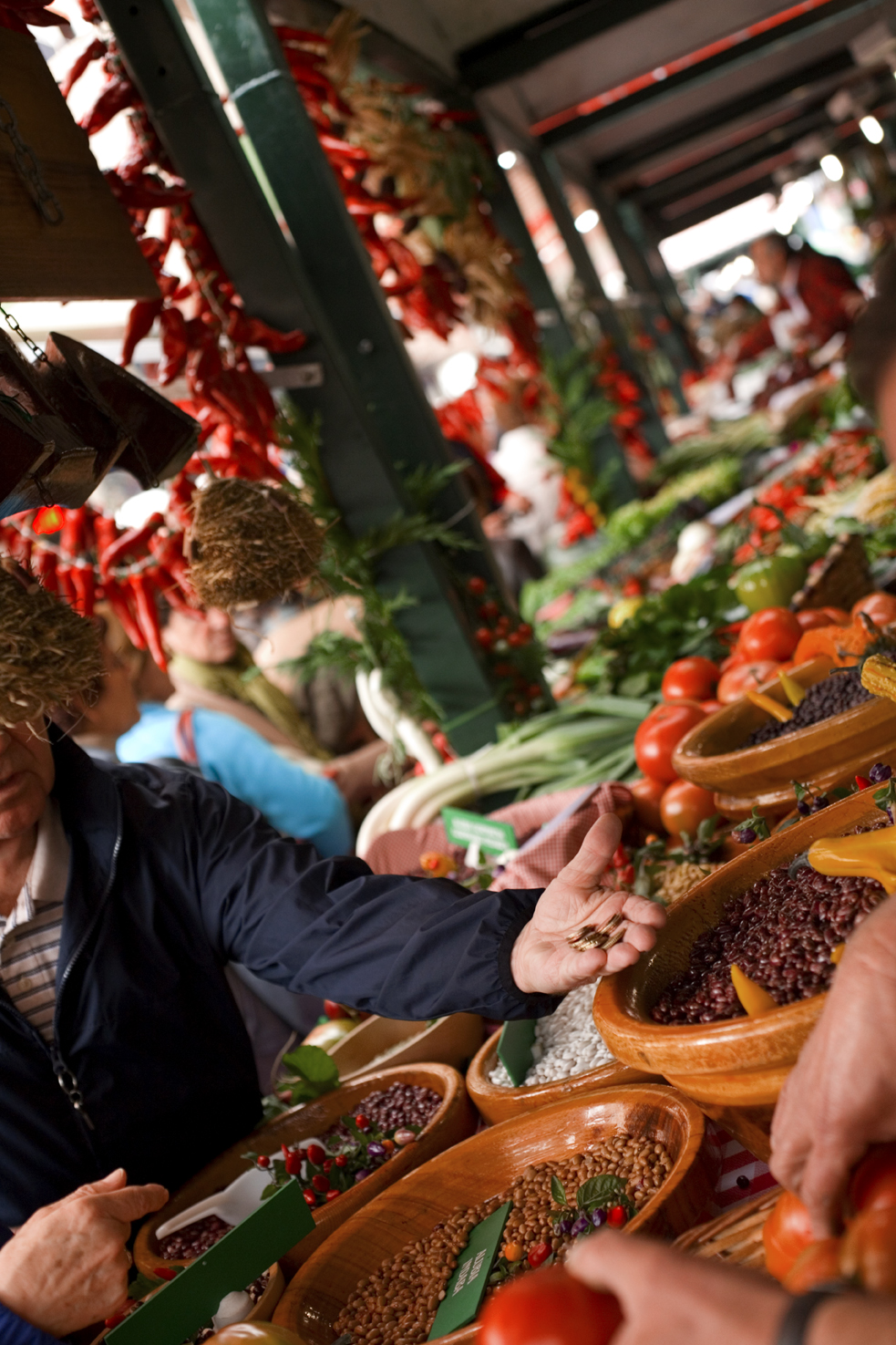
Guernica marketplace

There is a popular saying in Guernica which runs as follows: "lunes gerniqués, golperik ez". A combination of both local languages (Castilian and Basque) into a single sentence, this translates roughly as "not a stroke of work gets done on Mondays". The Monday market day has for decades been considered as a holiday in the town.

People would flock to Guernica not just from the immediate vicinity, but from all over the province, so that the town was packed. They came not just to buy or sell at the produce market, but also to eat at the town's renowned restaurants and afterwards perhaps to watch a pelota game at the local court. The Monday market has been fulfilling its age-old function of bringing people together since the times when people could not afford to travel far and it provided them with a chance to socialise. The bombing of Guernica by Nazi Germany's Luftwaffe and the Italian Aviazione Legionaria was deliberately chosen to occur on a Monday (April 26, 1937), because it was known that the Basque people who lived outside of Guernica proper would travel into town for the Market Day, thus affording the pilots of the German and Italian aircraft the opportunity to murder as many people as possible.

== Sports ==
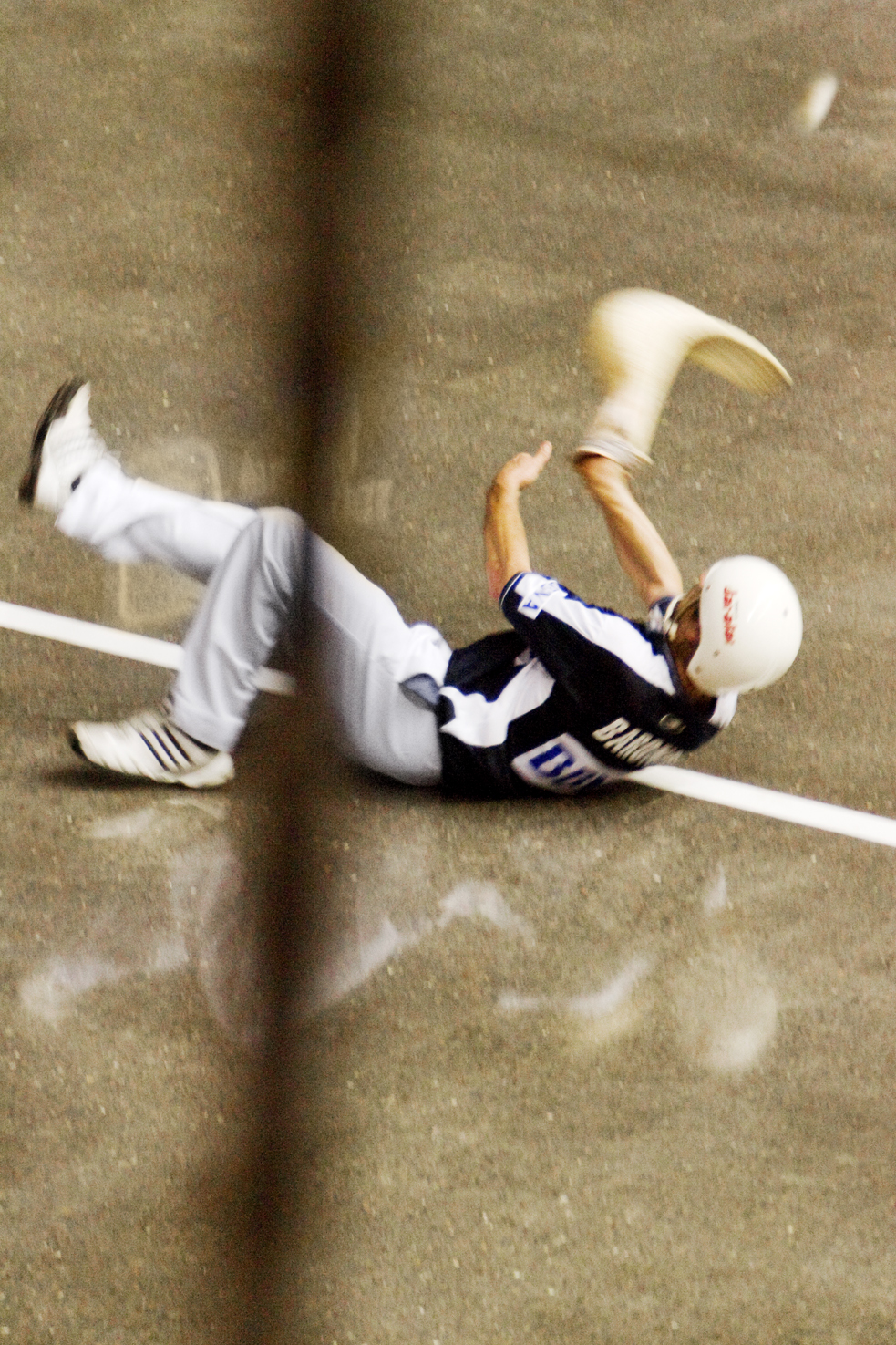
A cesta-punta player

Jai alai (cesta-punta) is a form of pelota. The Guernica jai alai court is the biggest operational court of its type in the world. It was designed by Secundino Zuano, one of Spain's leading architects of the 20th century and first opened in 1963. It is acknowledged by players of the game to be the world's finest court.

Bare-handed pelota games are held at the Santanape court. This is the most popular form of the sport.

== Twin towns – sister cities ==
- Berga, Catalonia, Spain
- Halabja, Kurdistan Region, Iraq
- Pforzheim, Germany
- Boise, Idaho, United States
- Irpin, Ukraine (2022)

== Notable people ==
- Manuel Allendesalazar y Muñoz de Salazar (1856–1923), conservative politician
- Teodoro de Arana y Beláustegui (1858–1945), Carlist politician
- Rafael Iriondo (1918–2016), footballer and manager
- Mauricio Ugartemendia Lauzirika (1934–2022), footballer
- Sofía Gandarias (1957–2016), painter
- Fernando Lamikiz Garai (born 1959), lawyer, economist and sports manager
- Enrique Guerrikagoitia (born 1967), cyclist
- Ainhoa Ibarra Astellara (born 1968), alpine skier
- Roberto Laiseka (born 1969), cyclist
- Yolanda Alzola (born 1970), actress
- Joane Somarriba (born 1972), cyclist
- Gorka Gerrikagoitia (born 1973), cyclist
- Rubén Oarbeascoa (born 1975), cyclist
- Lander Euba (born 1977), cyclist
- Andoni Lafuente (born 1985), cyclist
- Pello Bilbao (born 1990), cyclist
- Gorka Larrucea (born 1993), footballer
- Koldo Obieta (born 1993), footballer
- Iker Amorrortu (born 1995), footballer
- Asier Villalibre (born 1997), footballer

== See also ==
- Bombing of Guernica
