= Teodoro de Arana y Beláustegui =

Spanish politician (1858–1945)

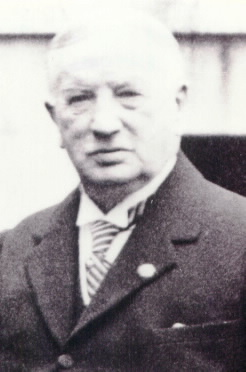
- Born: Teodoro de Arana y Beláustegui; 1858; Guernica, Spain
- Died: 1945 (aged 86–87); Bilbao, Spain
- Occupation: lawyer
- Known for: politician
- Political party: Carlism

Teodoro Benigno Ignacio de Arana y Beláustegui (1858–1945) was a Spanish Carlist politician. His career climaxed during last decades of the Restoration period: in 1903 he was elected to Congreso de los Diputados, the lower chamber of the Cortes, and in 1905, 1916 and 1918 he was voted into the Senate. In two separate spells of 1915–1919 and 1923–1932, Arana served as leader of the Biscay branch of Carlism. He was also known as a vehement advocate of separate legal establishments for the Basque provinces, as the author of a related pamphlet and as a promoter of Basque culture. He was the first person in Spain to send a telegram in Basque.

== Family and youth ==
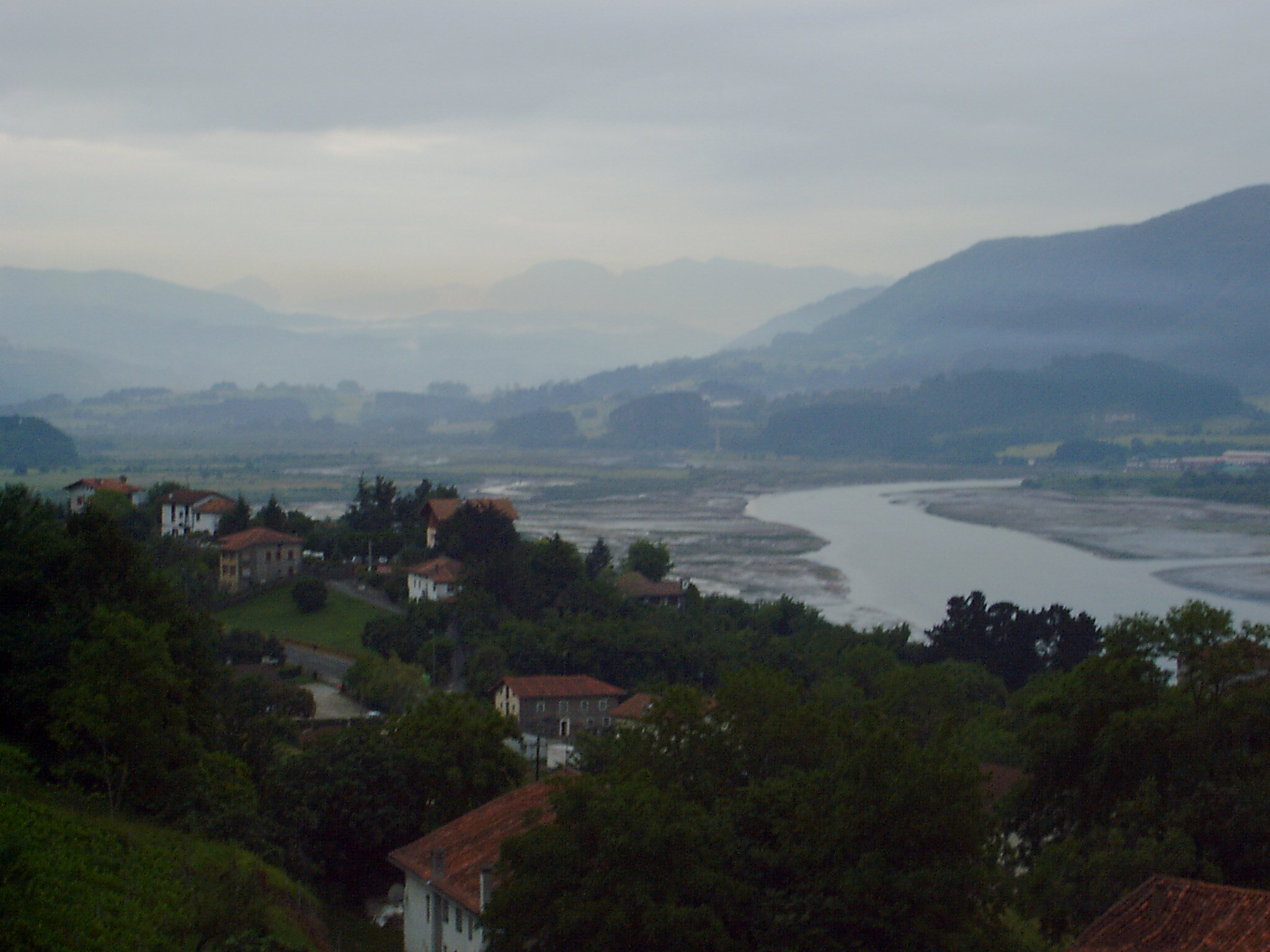
Oca estuary

The surname of Arana has been recorded already in the Medieval period, but ancestors of Teodoro can be traced back only to the early 18th century; his great-great-grandfather, born in 1703, was the native of the Biscay town of Arteaga. Also his descendants lived in north-eastern part of the province, in the Oca basin; the grandfather of Teodoro, Manuel de Arana Gandarías (born 1770), was related to Arrazua, though sources note him also in relation to Ajanguir and Marquina; it is not clear what he was doing for a living. At some point he moved to Guernica, another town at the banks of the Oca, and this is where the father of Teodoro, José Ignacio de Arana Torrezuri, was born. He became a lawyer and in some sources is referred to as "reputado jurisconsulto"; he worked as Registrador de la Propiedad and retired in 1870.

At unspecified time, probably in the mid-19th century, Arana Torrezuri married María Dolores de Beláustegui Arriaga from Busturia, also a town at the Oca banks. The couple lived in Guernica; they had at least 4 children, born from mid- till the late 1850s. Teodoro was born either as the youngest or as the second youngest one. None of the sources consulted provides any information on his childhood and early youth, except that the boys received "sólida educación cristiana". In 1876-1877 he was frequenting Instituto Vizcaino in Bilbao, but in 1877 – somewhat late compared to standard age - he obtained bachillerato and Titulo de perito mercantil in Instituto Provincial in Santander. It is not clear where he studied law; both his brothers pursued their academic career in Valladolid. It is neither clear when he graduated and when he commenced his law career. The first information identified is from 1887, when Teodoro was nominated juzgado de primera instancia in Guadix; however, he resigned this position and in 1890 latest was noted as engaged in law practice in Guernica.

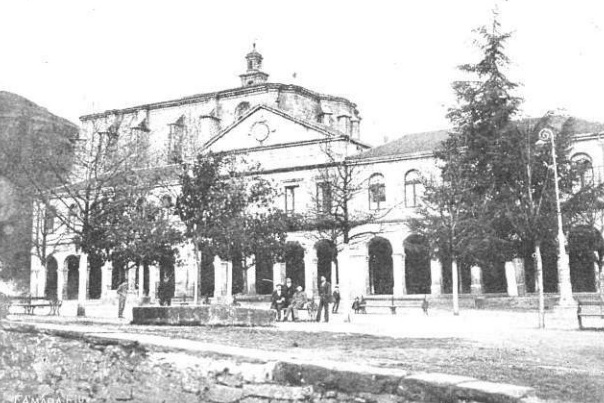
Guernica

In 1889 Arana married Cruz Dolores Niceta Larrinaga y Luzárraga (died 1944). Though she was born in Mundaca, a town in the Oca estuary, since the 1860s her parents were related to Liverpool. Her father, Ramón de Larrinaga, was co-founder and co-owner of Olano, Larrinaga & Co., a shipping company which operated a number of merchant vessels; they served mostly at long-distance routes, including the Philippines. The marriage elevated Arana to high-bourgeoisie and dramatically changed his financial position; in Guernica the couple built an imposing palace-like family residence, named Nere Kabia. They had 5 children: Ramón, Soledad, Teodoro, Margarita and Ricardo de Arana Larrinaga; none of them became a public figure. The best-known Arana's relative was his older brother Joaquín, who before his premature death in 1896-1898 served as a Carlist deputy to the Cortes. More distant relatives made their name in Argentina.

== Ascendance to Cortes (before 1905) ==
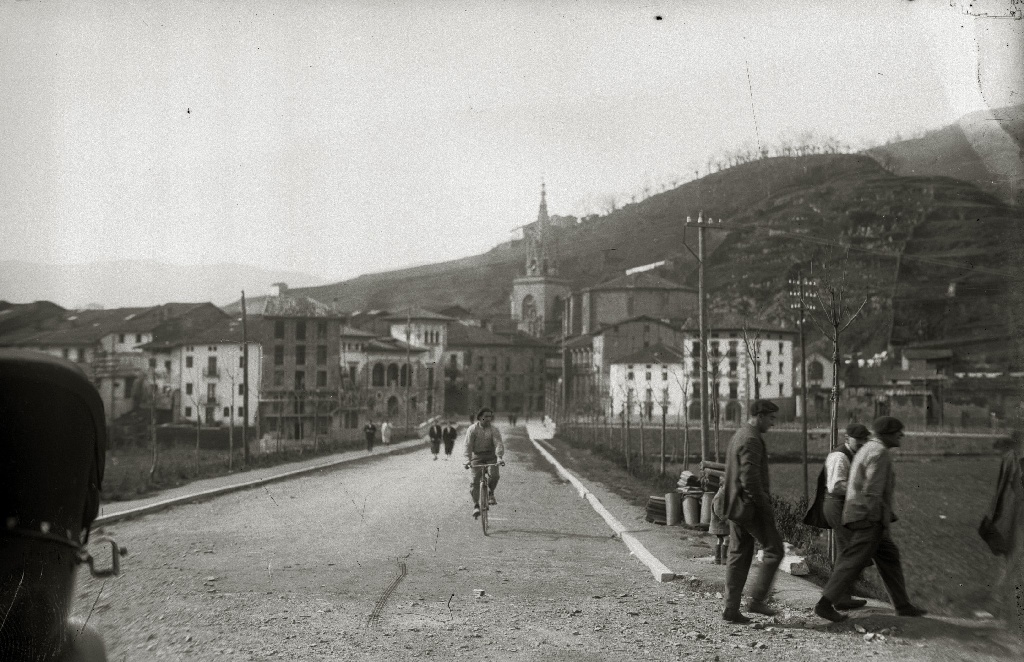
Azpeitia

There is no information available on political preferences of more distant Arana's ancestors; his father was of Traditionalist inclinations and in the 1860s all family members – including the 7-year-old Teodoro – were listed in a Carlist periodical as donating money to religious cause. In 1873 his older brother Joaquín as a 19-year-old volunteered to legitimist troops, but there is no information that Teodoro – in his late teens during last years of the Third Carlist War – followed suit. In 1885 he was noted as a signatory of open letters, published in the press in support of the then top Carlist theorist, Ramón Nocedal, but he did not follow the Nocedalistas during the 1888 breakup. In the late 1880s and early 1890s he was noted merely as engaged in organizing local Catholic festivities in Guernica or as a lawyer. In the mid-1890s Teodoro supported his brother Joaquín in the latter's bid for the Cortes mandate from the Gipuzkoan district of Azpeitia; the 1896 success was particularly cheered by the claimant Carlos VII, as Joaquín Arana defeated the detested rebel leader, Nocedal.

Teodoro Arana commenced his political career somewhat late, when he was already in his early 40s. In 1901 he was supposed to replace his brother and stand in Azpeitia as the Carlist candidate to the Cortes. Though officially approved by the party executive he eventually withdrew. The reasons remain unclear; in Azpeitia the mandate was seized by an Integrist candidate, Antonio Aldama y Mendívil. Arana resumed his bid in 1903, again in Azpeitia and again as a Carlist candidate. Like his brother 7 years earlier, he competed against Ramón Nocedal. With 3628 votes gathered he trashed the Integrist leader, who gained merely 134 votes; the claimant was delighted to see the chief rebel humiliated.

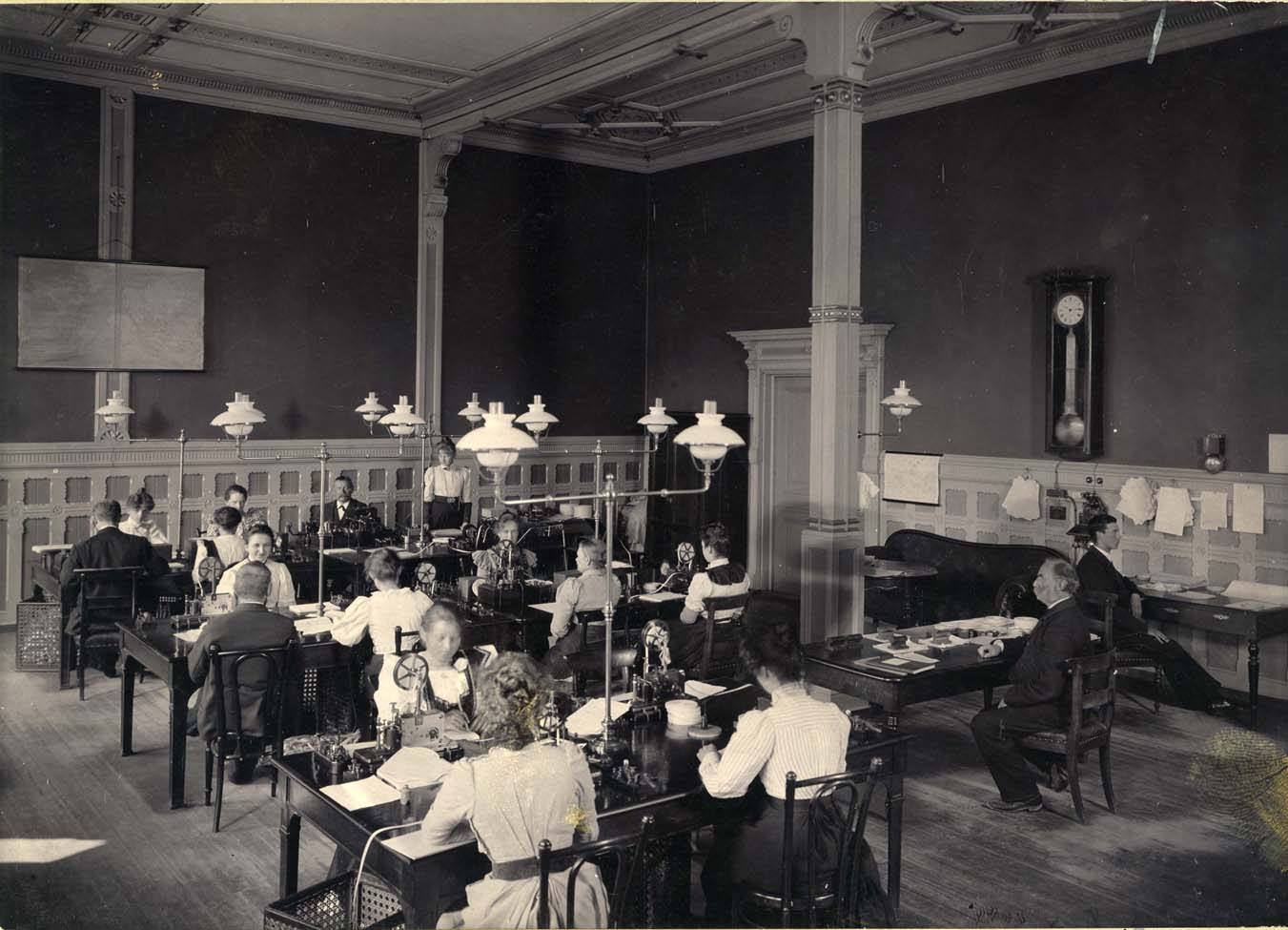
early telegraph office (example)

Before the Congress' term expired in 1905 Arana barely made himself visible, noted only for an initiative to raise benefits for rural parochial clergy and for signing some motions, e.g. the one on military issues by a fellow Carlist Llorens. Within the party he remained merely president of the Guernica círculo, though at times he also accompanied Traditionalist pundits on their trips in the vasco-navarrese region. Following a 1904 royal decree which allowed telegraph messages in "regional languages", Arana was the first person in Spain to cable in Basque, a measure of his zeal when supporting Basque culture. His vasquismo was also – if not primarily – formatted as a drive to restore fueros, traditional separate legal establishments of the Basque provinces. Arana was on friendly terms with Liga Foral Autonomista, a 1904-created alliance. When his parliamentary ticket was about to expire, the League pledged their support in case he decides to run for re-election in Azpeitia during the campaign of 1905. He was widely expected to stand, possibly also as a Carlist candidate; however, eventually he did not compete.

== First Senate term and afterwards (1905-1915) ==
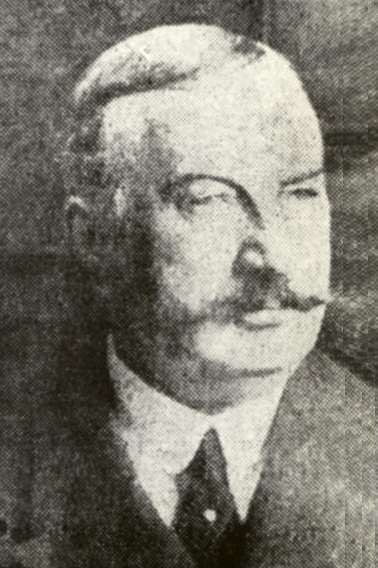
Arana, early 20th c.

In 1905 Liga Foral appointed Arana as their candidate to the senate, from the pool reserved for provincial self-governments. There were no counter-candidates fielded and in 1905 Diputación Provincial de Guipúscoa elected him to the upper chamber. At the time Carlist structures viewed Liga as an organization dominated by local conservative caciques. Carlos VII denounced it as incompatible with Traditionalism. During his electoral campaign Arana published an open letter, titled A los carlistas guipuzcoanos; he claimed that objectives of the League overlap with the Carlist ones and defended his access to the alliance. The claimant grumbled that Arana turned Traditionalism on its head, but having one more representative in the senate, he preferred not to disauthorise him. The liberal press cheered upon perceived "descomposición del carlismo", but the Basque regional jefe Tirso de Olazabal limited himself to publishing an ambiguous letter. Contemporary scholar presents the episode as a good demonstration of erratic Carlist position versus Basque autonomous demands.

During his senate term of 1905-1907 Arana welcomed emergence of strong regional Catalan representation formed by Solidaritat Catalana; as a measure of Basque-Catalan "foral unity" he entertained the Catalans in Guernica and co-organized a banquet to honor them in the chamber. Another thread of his activity was engagement against so-called Ley de Jurisdicciones, which declared some sort of offences under the military jurisdiction; his address in the chamber was later published as a pamphlet. Concerned that new regulations might be used to repress the Basque movement, he urged to distinguish between separatism and regionalism. Other interventions focused on unrelated issues, e.g. he protested the marriage of Alfonso XIII since in his opinion, it would imply an alliance with Britain.

Carlist standard

In 1908 Arana was rumored to be a Carlist candidate to Congreso from Tudela, but eventually he did not stand; the same year the Vatican administration made him conde ponteficio. There is little information on his public engagements of the early 1910s, except joining some local initiatives against secular schools. In the party his position changed; following death of Carlos VII older conflicts were being marginalized and Carlism was getting divided along new lines, marked by the conflict between the new claimant Jaime III and the key party theorist, Vázquez de Mella. The Biscay organisation was increasingly fragmented. At some point the Carlist national leader, marqués de Cerralbo, asked Arana to enter the 3-member directorio, a provisional party board supposed to introduce discipline. He refused, quoting incompatibility with local Biscay señorial tradition and dysfunctional nature of collegial executive. In 1915 Cerralbo agreed and nominated him Jefe Señorial, the Biscay party leader.

== Biscay leader, senator again (1915-1919) ==
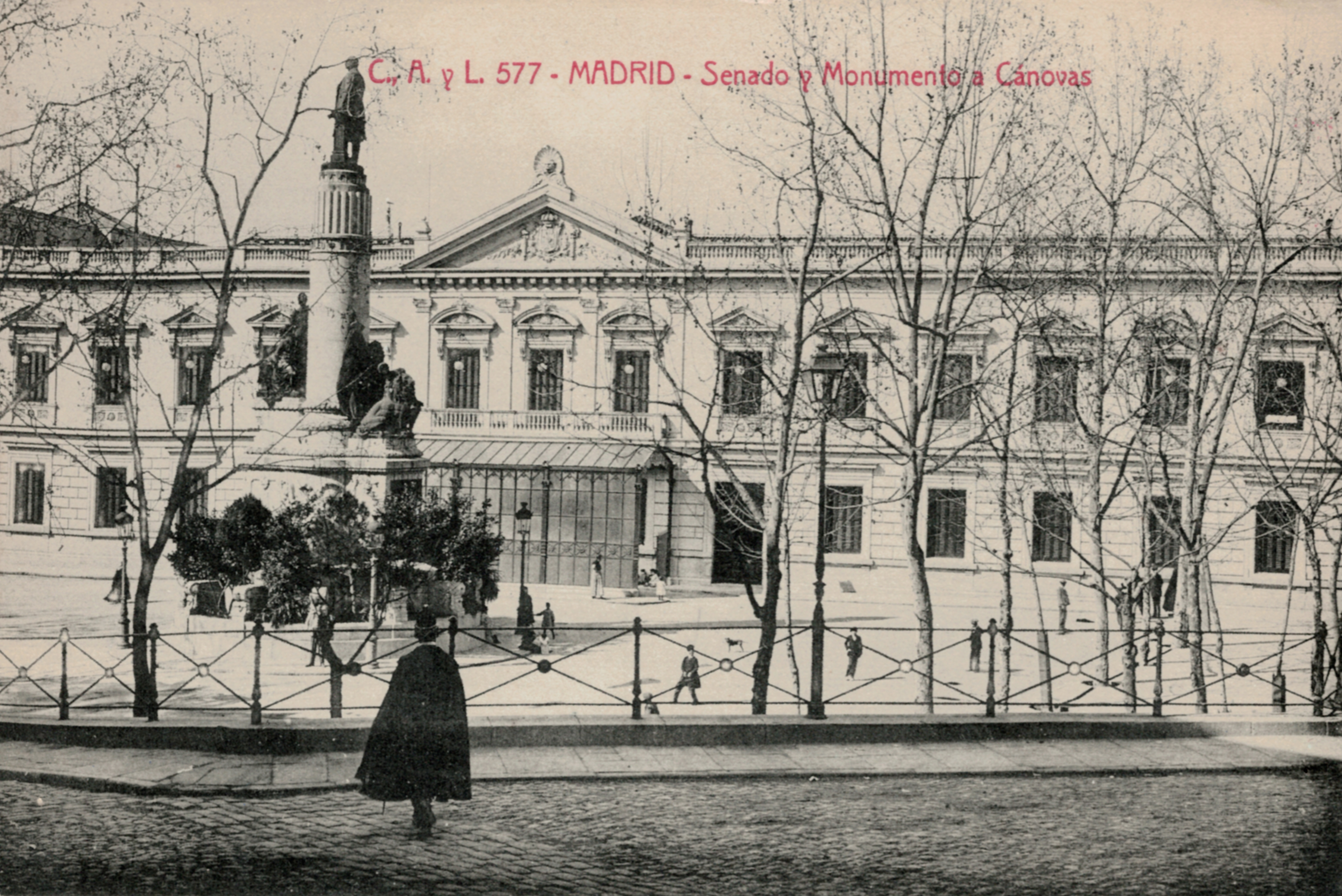
Palacio del Senado

As new head of the Biscay Carlism Arana tried to introduce discipline. His campaign was aimed mostly against a faction identified as "piñosos", those suspected of sympathy towards La Piña; it was an informal liberal grouping led by Víctor Chávarri, which dominated Biscay politics of the period. Arana claimed that "levadura rebelde" bewildered "gran parte de la masa del Partido"; he issued Reglamento, unheard of before, called for unity behind the "Dios, Fueros, Patria, Rey" theme and declared war against "modernismo político". He declared results of 1915 elections to the Bilbao municipal council a success; similarly, he claimed that having Ampuero elected to the Cortes in 1916 and 3 candidates voted into the Bilbao town hall in 1917 were more than satisfactory results; he blamed treason in own ranks and pucherazos on part of the administration as reasons for poor showing in the 1917 provincial elections.

In late 1916 thanks to alliance with the Integrists Arana with no opposing candidate was again elected to the senate, the mandate which was prolonged in following elections of 1918. During both terms and less than 3 years he was barely active in the chamber. His most notable undertaking was an appeal for "reintegración foral", co-signed with other Basque senators and lodged with the prime minister, Manuel García Prieto. As it was not acted upon, Arana was among organizers of the grand Carlist rally, which materialized in 1918 as so-called Gran Asamblea de Zumárraga. It declared autonomy as "medio transitorio" on the path towards the future foral system end called all parties operational in Vascongadas to join common efforts to get it restored. Though a senator and a provincial Biscay leader, Arana did not play any role in Carlist national politics.

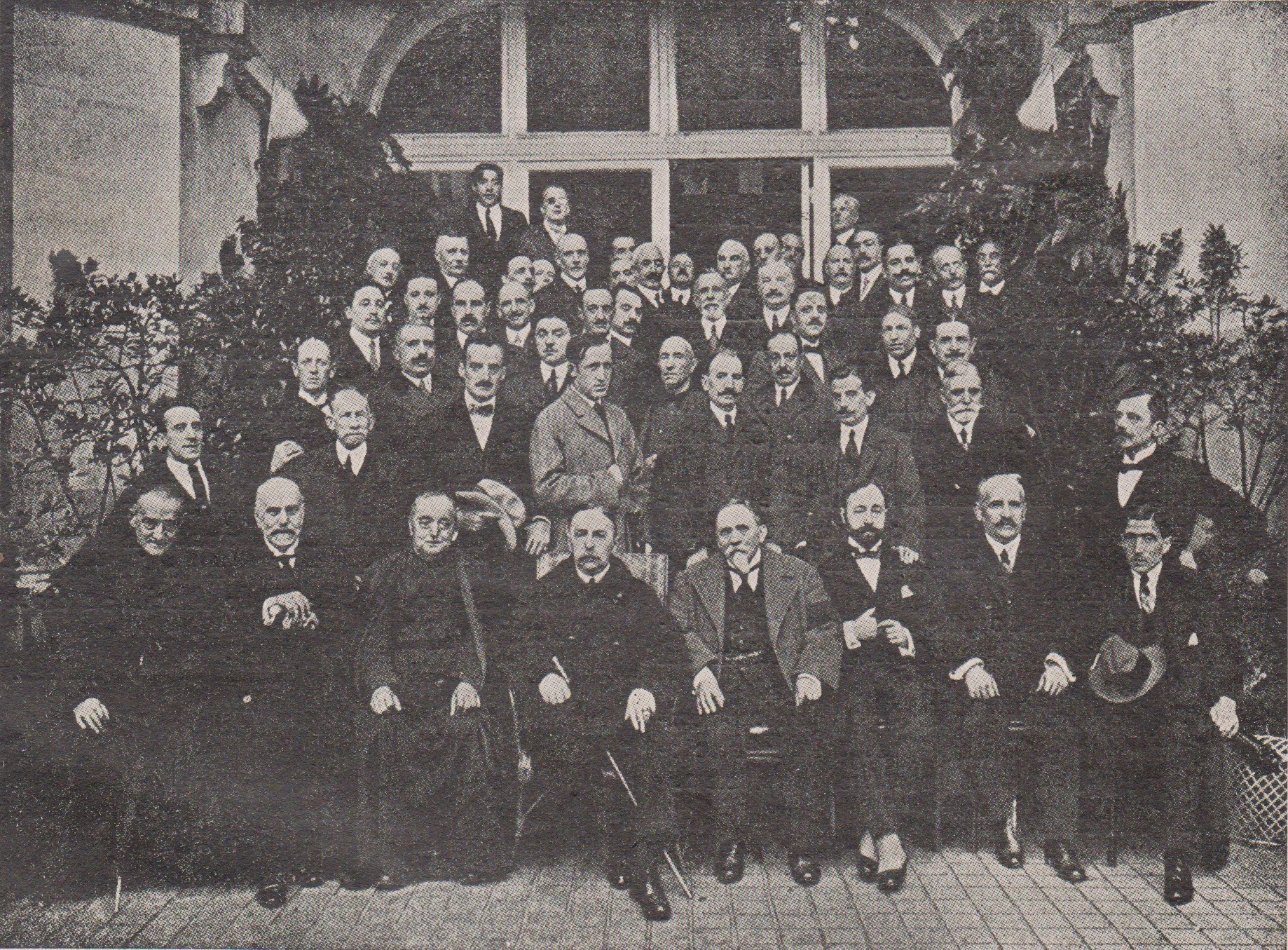
Arana in Magna Junta de Biarritz

Arana's strategy did not work. Biscay branches of mainstream parties accused him of siding with Basque separatism. Basque nationalists remained adamant and negotiations on would-be electoral alliances failed. The Carlist Junta Central, in 1918 largely decomposed and disoriented, banned alliances with "enemies of Spain"; Arana blamed Ignacio González de Careaga, another Carlist politician from Bilbao and at the time the secretary of Junta Central, for instigating a campaign against him. In early 1919 the Biscay Junta Señorial declared that they were not obliged to follow recommendations from the Madrid headquarters; Arana issued a manifesto which voiced both against designs of "Estado Vasco" on the one hand and against "régimen centralista y opresor" on another. The conflict seemed solved when Jaime III returned from wartime house arrest in Austria and dissolved the central executive, result of the long-standing fray with the Mellistas. However, Arana was already tired; quoting health reasons he handed the new party leader Pascual Comín his resignation note. He took part in the grand Carlist rally known as Magna Junta de Biarritz before in December 1919 his request was granted.

== Fraternidad Vasco-Histórica (1921) ==
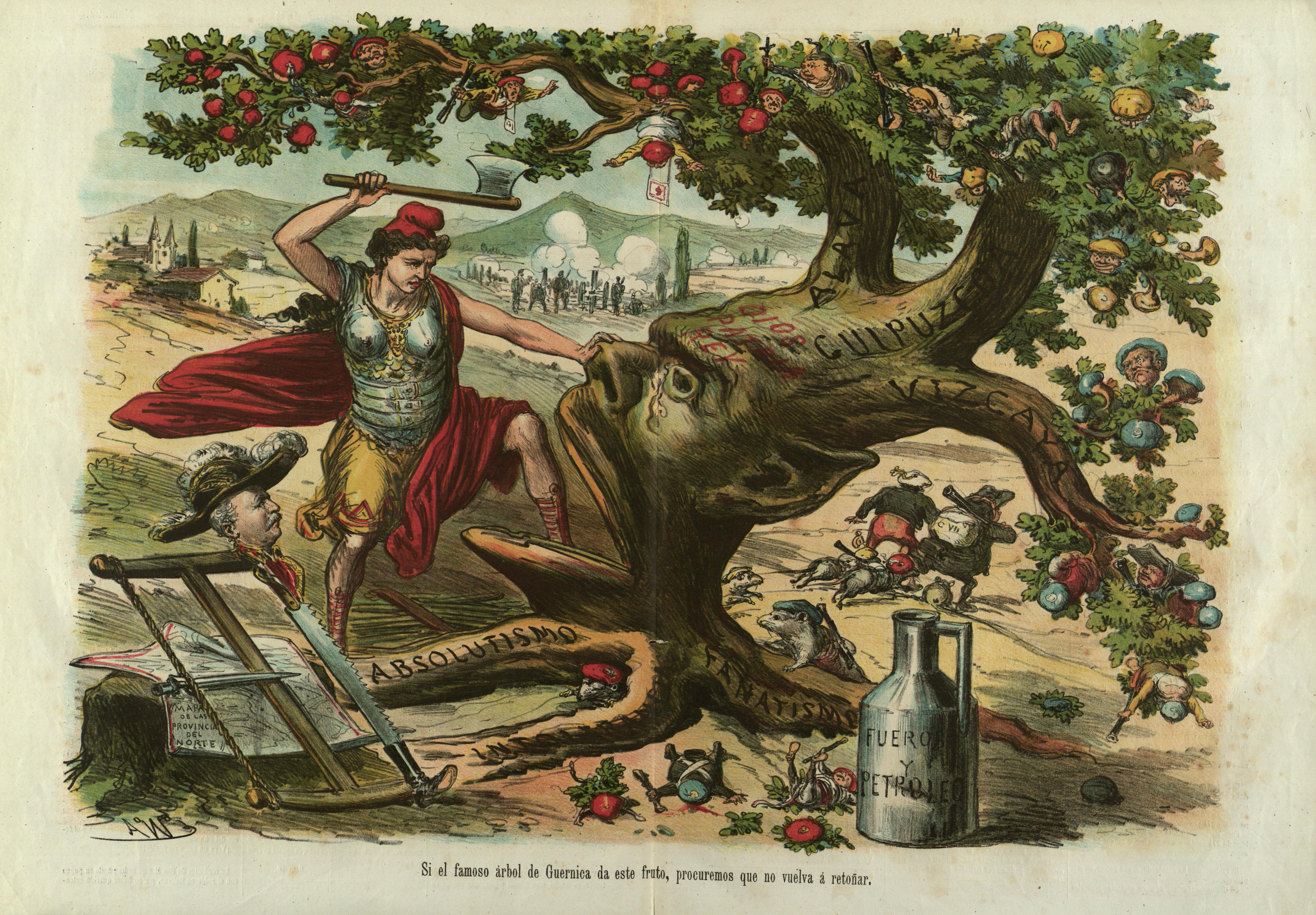
Guernica oak in liberal anti-fuerista propaganda cartoon, 19th c.

Following earlier initiatives aimed at reintegración foral, in 1918 Arana co-founded Sociedad de Estudios Vascos. However, his best-known contribution to the Basque issue was a 250-page book, published in 1921 in Bilbao and titled Fraternidad Vasco-Histórica. The volume is divided into 2 parts: the first, titled En justa defensa, is a partisan account of political turmoil within the Biscay branch of Carlism throughout the previous decade; Arana defends himself against charges of sustaining separatism. Last chapters of this part are directed also against the Carlist national executive, though Arana is cautious to present himself as a loyal Carlist. This part is appreciated by historians as providing insights into "disensiones internas del jaimismo vizcaino". The second part, titled La cuestión foral, is a call to restore separate Basque legal establishments, symbolised by the Guernica oak and abolished during the 19th century. Together with the 1915 work by Echave-Sustaeta, it is the most extensive lecture on Carlist vision of fueros.

The key motive listed behind the publication is countering "criminal campaign" against Biscay liberties, pursued by "malos vascos" who call themselves Traditionalists; they joined "planes maquiavélicos" and propaganda "anti-patriotica, anti-fuerista, anti-vasca y, sobre todo, anti-vizcaina". Arana intends to present the genuine, Traditionalist vision of the fueros. They are depicted as innate, history-grounded regulations to be respected and not as privileges (or contracts), granted (or agreed) by (or with) central authority. They are perceived as specific for separate entities (Navarre, Álava, Gipuzkoa, Biscay) and not as applicable generically to the region. He did not pursue a separatist claim and has never campaigned for breakup with Madrid; in his vision, the king of Spain was ruling in Bilbao as lord (señor) of Biscay. He declared also that "vasquismo y españolismo son armónicos" and that "we the Basques are not only vasquistas, but also españolistas".

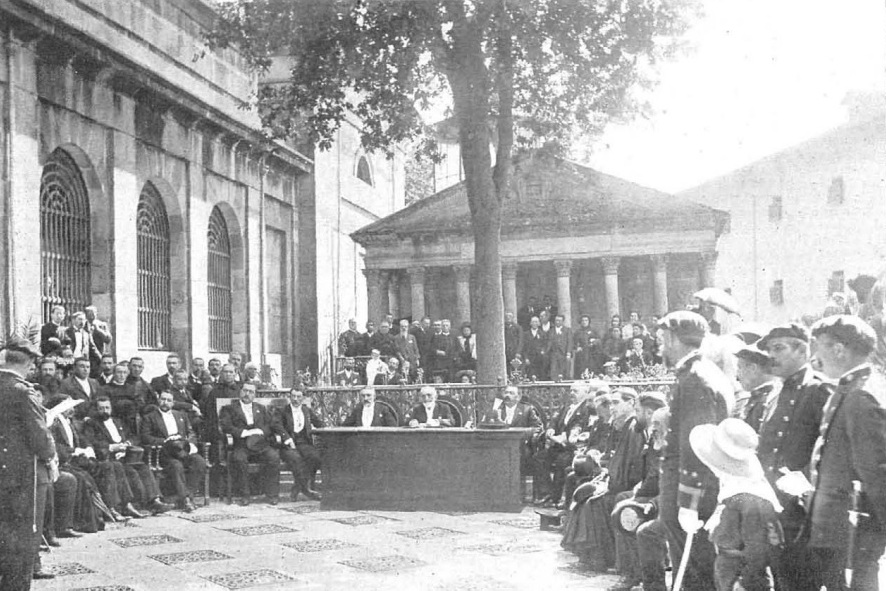
Guernica oak during Biscay fuerista ceremony, early 20th c.

Apart from a different format (Arana is closer to political theory, Echave wrote a historiographic narrative), Arana's understanding of fueros differs somewhat from this, offered 6 years earlier by Echave-Sustaeta. His focus is on Biscay (not Navarre). He understands "Patria" as a Basque spiritual fatherland (not as Spain), and sees Euskeria as a separate state (not a unit within Spain). It is to be united with Madrid by means of personal union (not federation). He pictures Basques as a "separate nation" or even "raza vasca" (terms avoided by Echave), even though he declares them "dentro de la unidad nacional española". His slogan is "Dios, Fueros, Patria, Señor" (not "Dios, Patria, Rey"). He embraces "fuerismo" as a term which reflects the proper attitude (not as a liberal distortion). His discourse is principally directed against "centralistas liberales" and he sees "bizkaitarras" as less of a threat (Echave's pamphlet was aimed against the Basque nationalists). His pamphlet ends with a call to form a formal alliance of all similarly minded Basques: Fraternidad Vasco-Histórica. In 1922 Arana published a minor booklet, titled La redención de Euskeria, as a follow-up.

== Renewed Biscay leadership (1923-1932) ==
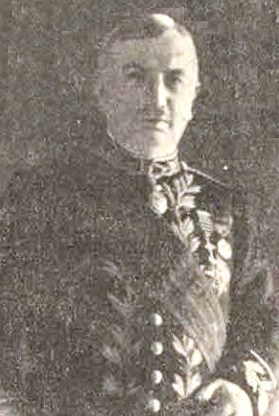
Arana, 1920s

After 4 years of absence in the upper chamber in 1923 Arana tried to renew his senate ticket, though this time from Vizcaya (not Gipuzkoa). Together with José Horn y Areilza and Ramón de Madariaga y Azcuenaga he was running against the Alfonsist Liga de Acción Monárquica as Candidatura Antiliguera, but failed. The same year the claimant Don Jaime nominated him again jefe señorial de Vizcaya, but following the Primo de Rivera coup political life was brought to a standstill. Arana's activity as the local Carlist leader in Biscay was reduced to delivering addresses during religious rallies flavored with Traditionalism (e.g. in 1924 in Begoña), to attending commemorative events related to Third Carlist War (e.g. in 1925 in Guernica), to presiding over close banquets (e.g. in 1926 in Bilbao), to donating money for related causes (e.g. in 1927 during Fiesta del Diario Jaimista), to homage meetings (e.g. in 1928 in Barcelona to honor Miguel Junyent) or to speaking at Jaimista círculos (e.g. in 1929 in Vitoria).

As he could pay less attention to politics, Arana focused on his family economy. At some point he purchased 75 hectares in Ereño, a municipality close to Guernica. He also intended to build a 4-floor health resort at Playa de Laga (Ibarranguelu), where he had earlier bought a plot of some 7 hectares, but these plans eventually came to naught. However, despite his earlier zealous engagement in support of the Basque cause and despite his role of co-founder of Sociedad de Estudios Vascos, the 1926 publication did not list him among socios de número. It was only in 1930, when the dictatorship crumbled and major change was widely anticipated, that SEV included him in the long list of members consulted over an autonomy plan; he responded that restoration of the foral system should be the ultimate objective, though autonomy was acceptable given it "respects historical rights".

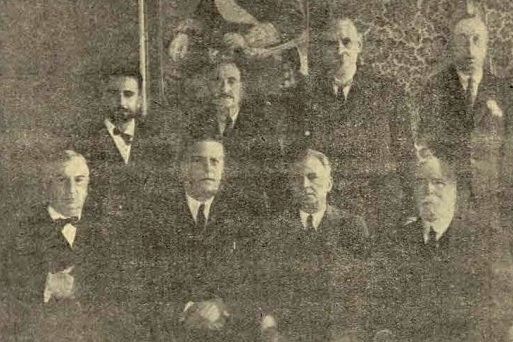
among Carlist leaders (1fL), 1930

The fall of Primo triggered hectic Carlist activity to rebuild the dormant organisation. During Dictablanda Arana was busy appointing members of restored local juntas; in the press he remained repeatedly listed as the party Biscay leader during various party initiatives, be it a general manifesto of unabated adherence to Traditionalist values or a meeting of party leaders in Azcoitia. During early months of the republic as the representative of Vizcaya he co-signed a Carlist call to restore "Juntas Generales en Vizcaya y Guipúzcoa, Hermandades en Alava y Cortes en Navarra", but voiced against "organización supraprovincial". He maintained close links with the new Madrid Carlist periodical, El Cruzado Español, which repeatedly hailed him as a Traditionalist patriarch and featured his photo on its pages. In his mid-70s, at the time he was already one of the oldest party leaders. In 1932 Arana again quoted health reasons and resigned from the Biscay jefatura; the new claimant Alfonso Carlos effusively thanked him and promptly accepted the resignation.

== Last years (after 1932) ==
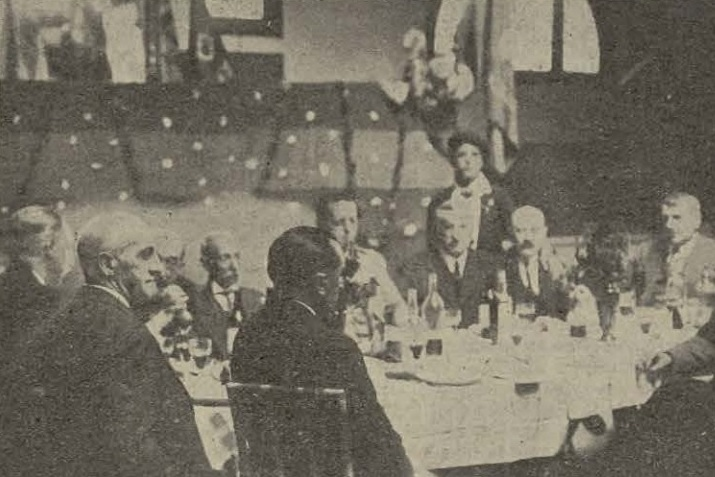
among Carlist leaders, early 1930s

In the mid-1930s Arana remained a political retiree, far from either provincial Biscay or nationwide Carlist decision-making; he was mentioned in the press merely on the societé columns. However, he retained links to El Cruzado Español, the paper which gradually assumed a somewhat factious stand; the related group started to suggest that the octogenarian claimant appoints a successor and suggested his grand-nephew, Karl Pius. The group became known as Núcleo de la Lealtad, and Arana was counted among its "cuadrilátero dirigente". Alfonso Carlos was increasingly irritated, but the group, already known as the cruzadistas, pressed on. In 1935 they organized a rally in Zaragoza, styled as a grand Carlist assembly, and declared that the dynastic succession rights should pass to Karl Pius. The 77-year-old Arana did not attend, but sent a letter which pledged support. In return, the claimant disauthorised the attendees.

None of the sources consulted provides information whether Arana was engaged or even aware of the Carlist conspiracy of the spring of 1936 and their gear-up to the coup of July 1936. In Biscay the rebels failed and Guernica remained in the loyalist zone, since October ruled by the autonomous Basque government. Arana's fate during this period is unclear; in the early spring of 1937 he was listed among "ciudadanos contra quienes existen cargos", but it is not known whether there were any measures adopted against him. His Nere Kabia residence, due to its large size and solid construction, was turned into one of the city shelters, supposed to accommodate people seeking refuge during air raids. On April 26, 1937, the building was destroyed in few minutes during the first bombing wave, though all of 80 people in its basement survived. It is not clear whether Arana himself suffered any injuries and whether he was present in his residence at the time.

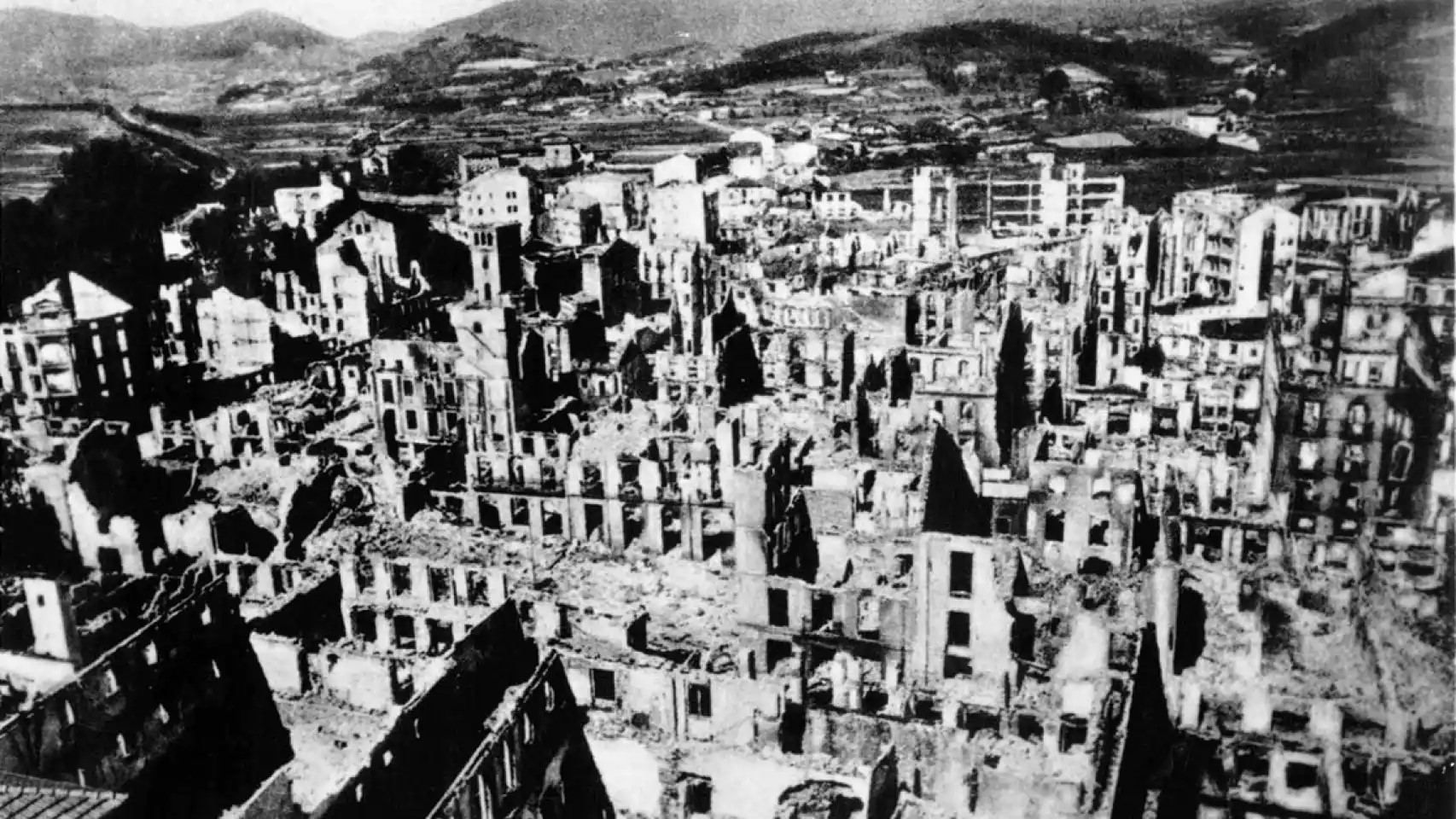
bombed Guernica

There is hardly any information available on Arana's fate following the Nationalist takeover of Guernica in 1937. He is not listed as taking part in any public events or as member of any structures. In a single case, in 1944 he was noted in the press as donating money to a religious cause. His passing away was acknowledged by numerous newspapers, also the Falangist ones; in obituary notes he was referred to – with respect though not any particular reverence – as a former Traditionalist leader in Biscay and one of great provincial figures, decorated by the pope with Great Cross of Pontificial Equestrian Order of Saint Sylvester. The Nere Kabia palace has not been rebuilt, and today merely the street name marks the place where it used to stand, though at least until the late 20th century numerous plots and estates in the neighborhood still remained in hands of Arana's descendants.

== See also ==
- Carlism
- Traditionalism (Spain)
- Fuero

== Footnotes ==
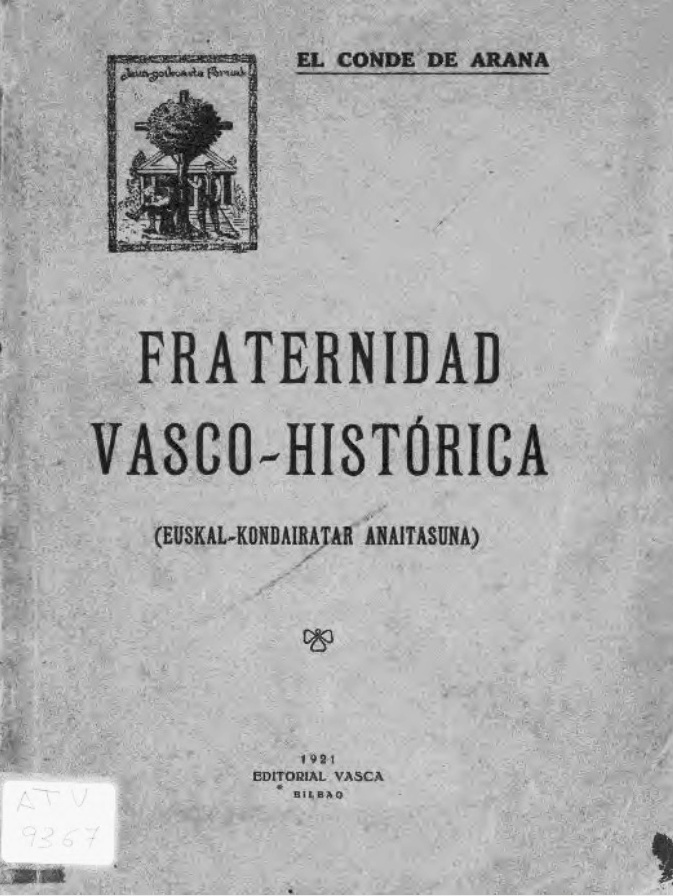
Fraternidad
