= Rubén Oarbeascoa =

Spanish cyclist

Personal information
- Full name: Rubén Oarbeascoa Ispizua
- Born: 21 November 1975 (age 50) Gernika, Spain

Cycling career
- Sport: Cycling
- Current team: Retired
- Discipline: Road
- Role: Rider

Professional teams
- 2000–2004: LA Pecol
- 2005–2006: Kaiku

Rubén Oarbeascoa Ispizua (born 21 November 1975) is a former Spanish professional cyclist.

== Biography ==
=== Amateur cycling ===
In 1999, he emerged as one of the strongest riders in Basque–Navarre amateur cycling after winning the Torneo Euskaldun. That year he also won the Bizkaiko Bira (Tour of Biscay), one of the most prestigious races on the amateur calendar.

Despite his strong season, Oarbeaskoa was not signed by the general manager of Euskaltel–Euskadi, Miguel Madariaga, to make the jump to the professional ranks with the Basque team. Oarbeaskoa was the only one among the four consecutive winners of the Torneo Euskaldun from 1998 to 2001 with the Olarra–Ercoreca team who was not signed by Madariaga, whereas Mikel Artetxe (1998), Gorka González (2000) and Lander Euba (2001) all were.

=== Professional cycling ===
==== Debut and time in Portugal ====
Unable to sign with Euskaltel–Euskadi, Oarbeaskoa had to make his professional debut in Portugal in 2000 with the modest team L. A. Pecol. That same year he participated in his first Grand Tour, the 2000 Vuelta a España, finishing 104th after featuring in several breakaways in search of a stage win.

In 2003 he placed sixth in the Spanish National Road Race Championships. He spent a total of five seasons with the Portuguese team.

==== Return with Kaiku and retirement ====
In 2005 he signed for the newly created Kaiku team, which competed in the Professional Continental category (i.e. not ProTour, in the year the division was created). This meant signing with a Basque team and returning home. Oarbeaskoa was one of the riders of the pink team who competed in the Tour of the Basque Country (a ProTour event, after being invited by the organisers) held in April, where he entered an unsuccessful breakaway in stage 3, finishing in Vitoria. He abandoned two days later during the morning sector of the 5th and final stage of the Basque race. In June he took part in the Euskal Bizikleta (non-ProTour), although without notable results, finishing 26th overall. Shortly afterwards he suffered an inguinal infection which affected his performance at the Spanish National Road Race Championships.

In 2006 he had a difficult start to the season after fracturing his collarbone on 10 February (in stage 1 of the Vuelta a Andalucía) and experiencing complications during his recovery. Upon his return to competition on 26 April at the Rheinland-Pfalz Rundfahrt, he was very active in the first stage (sharing a breakaway with two other riders which was caught 9 km from the finish), even climbing to fifth overall thanks to bonus seconds. Oarbeaskoa stepped onto the podium twice at the end of the German race: he won the mountains classification and Kaiku won the teams classification.

He retired at the end of the season after the Kaiku team folded due to a lack of sponsorship, following the organisers’ decision not to invite the team to the 2006 Vuelta a España.

== Palmares ==
=== 1999 ===
1st Bizkaiko Bira
