= Knowler =

Origin
- Language: English

Knowler is an uncommon English surname, a toponymic derived from knoll (Old English cnoll), with the suffix -er common in Kent and Sussex.
