= Krug =

Krug may refer to:

== Places ==
- Krug, an unincorporated community in Napa Valley, California
- Krug Park (amusement park), Omaha
- Krug Park (St. Joseph, Missouri)

== Entertainment ==
- Lemuel Krug, real identity of Bloodhawk, a Marvel Comics character
- Krug, one of the races in the action role-playing video game Dungeon Siege
- Krug, a 1996 album by Indira Radić

== Other uses ==
- Krug, German for beer stein
- Krug (surname), people with this surname
- krug, the assembly of several Cossack hosts
- Champagne Krug, a prestige brand of Champagne
- 2K11 Krug or Lyulev 9M8 Krug, surface-to-air missile system

== See also ==
- Crug (disambiguation)
- Kruge (disambiguation)
