= Carl Kölling =

German composer

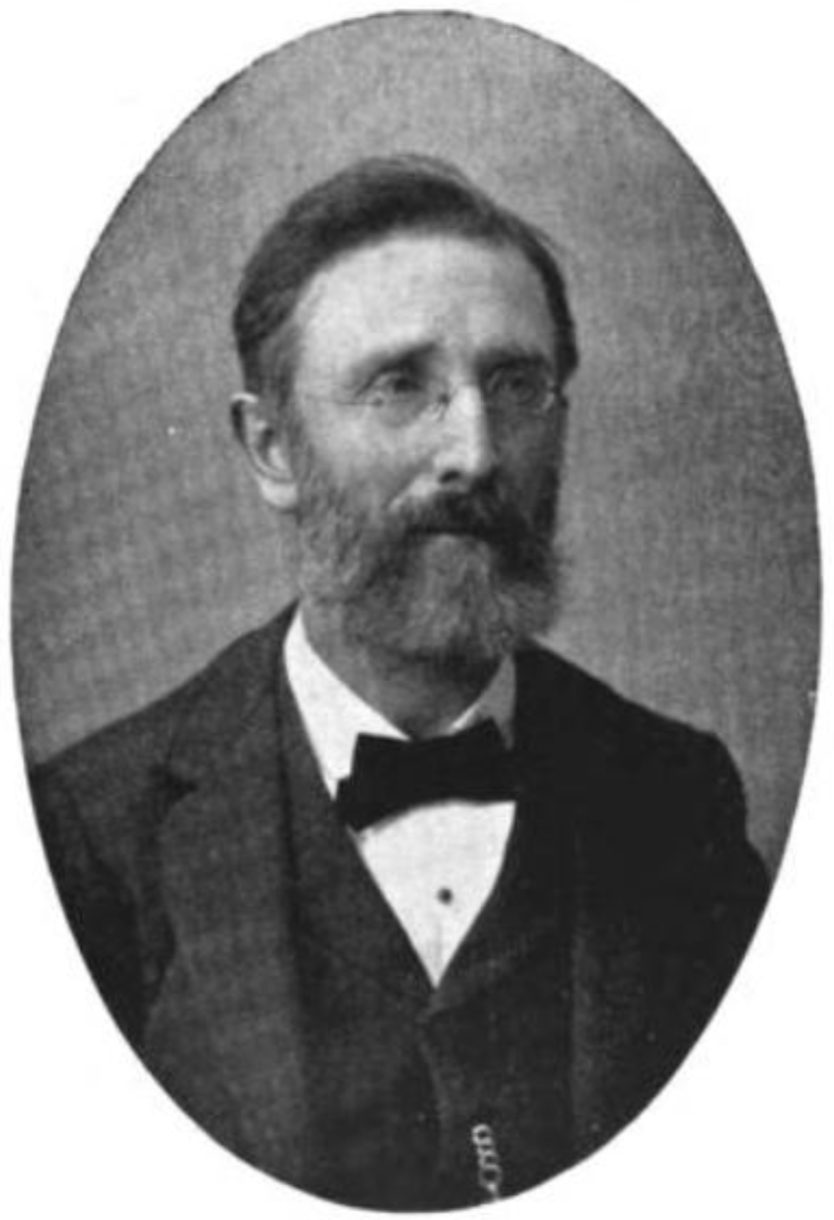
- Born: 28 February 1831; Free and Hanseatic City of Hamburg
- Died: 3 May 1914 (aged 83); Chicago, Illinois

Carl Kölling (28 February 1831 – 3 May 1914) was a German composer of piano music.

Two works available for the intermediate piano student are (Lose Blätter) Flying Leaves in C Major, Op. 147, No. 1 and Fluttering Leaves in A Minor, Op. 147, No. 2 found in Masterpieces with Flair published by Alfred Publishing Company, Inc.

Hungary (Rapsodie Mignonne), Op. 410, is in Your Favorite Solos for Piano compiled and edited by George Walter Anthony from Th. Presser.

== Biography ==
Kölling was born in Hamburg, Germany in 1831 to a musical family. He was taught by Jacob Schmitt and moved to Chicago, United States in 1878. In the US, he worked as a pianoforte teacher.
