= Iker Amorrortu =

Spanish footballer

Personal information
- Full name: Iker Amorrortu Andrinua
- Date of birth: 17 October 1995 (age 31)
- Place of birth: Guernica, Spain
- Height: 1.70 m (5 ft 7 in)
- Position: Winger

Team information
- Current team: Arenas Club
- Number: 17

Youth career
- Gernika

Senior career*
Years	Team	Apps	(Gls)
2014–2015	Urbieta		
2015	Gernika	1	(0)
2015–2016	Bermeo	38	(19)
2016–2018	Vitoria	28	(10)
2018–2019	Basconia	16	(5)
2018–2019	→ Durango (loan)	37	(7)
2019–2020	Amorebieta	25	(7)
2020–2021	Calahorra	24	(7)
2021–2022	Amorebieta	8	(1)
2022–2023	Numancia	4	(0)
2023	Algeciras	0	(0)
2024	Tudelano	14	(3)
2024–	Arenas Club	5	(0)
- * Club domestic league appearances and goals as of 15 June 2025

Iker Amorrortu Andrinua (born 17 October 1995) is a Spanish footballer who plays as a right winger for Arenas Club.

== Club career ==
Born in Guernica, Biscay, Basque Country, Amorrortu finished his formation with hometown side Gernika Club, and made his senior debut with farm team Urbieta FT in 2014. In 2015, after only one first team appearance, he moved to Tercera División side Bermeo FT.

In July 2016, Amorrortu moved to SD Eibar's farm team CD Vitoria, also in the fourth division. He contributed with ten goals in his first season as his club achieved promotion to Segunda División B, but featured rarely in his second and moved to CD Basconia on 3 January 2018.

On 23 July 2018, Amorrortu was loaned to third division side SCD Durango, for one year. On 1 July of the following year, after the club's relegation he signed for fellow league team SD Amorebieta.

On 19 June 2020, Amorrortu agreed to a deal with CD Calahorra still in division three. On 8 July of the following year, he returned to Amorebieta, with the club now in Segunda División.

Amorrortu made his professional debut on 14 August 2021, coming on as a late substitute for Gorka Guruzeta in a 0–2 away loss against Girona FC. He scored his first professional goal on 24 October, netting his team's only in a 1–2 home loss against Real Sociedad B.

On 22 January 2022, Amorrortu terminated his contract with the Azules, and joined Segunda División RFEF side CD Numancia five days later.
