= Sofía Gandarias =

Spanish painter

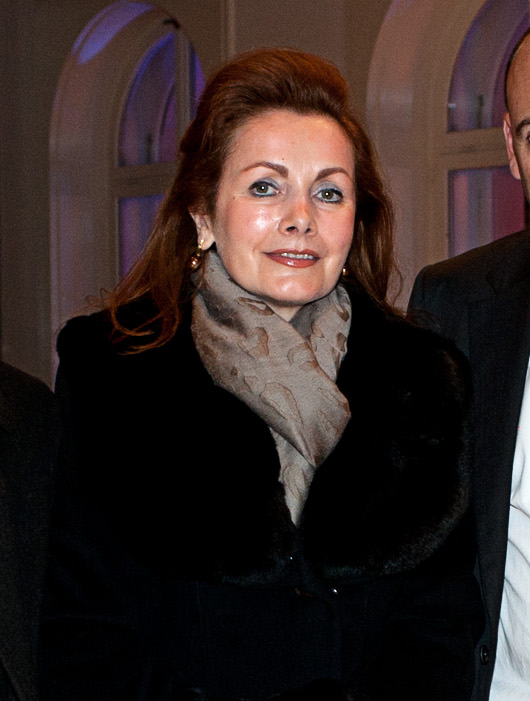
In 2011

Sofía Gandarias (1957 – 23 January 2016) was a Spanish painter.

== Life ==
Gandarías was a Spanish painter, born in Guernica in the Basque Country. She graduated in Fine Arts from the Facultad de Bellas Artes de San Fernando, Universidad Complutense, Madrid.

Music had been a powerful influence on her life. In 1978 she painted Kokoscha-Alma Mahler, three characters whose interrelated destinies are representative of their Zeitgeist. This was the beginning of an intense artistic output in series such as "La protesta del silencio" (1980) or "Presencias" (1986). “Gandarias contemplates her models, living or dead, with a gaze like that of a seer or a somnambulist, in order to give them form ” from within” and to release their voices.“(Roa Bastos)

She married Enrique Barón Crespo in Venice in 1987. Her son Alejandro was born the following year. She resumed her work with a big retrospective exhibition in Venice, the city which is her inspiration, in 1990. Her commitment to world peace and culture was expressed in her exhibition “Pour la tolerance” at the Grande Arche de la Fraternité, Paris. This was opened by Federico Mayor Zaragoza, Simone Veil and Barbara Hendricks, whose portrait “Love Prayer” was the symbol of the show which celebrated the 50th Anniversary of UNESCO. She painted the portrait of the great virtuoso violinist Yehudi Menuhin “the wisest man I have ever met” and began to cooperate with his Foundation.

She devoted the year 2000 to the study of Primo Levi's “Se questo è un uomo” (“If This Is a Man”) which resulted in the series "Primo Levi, la memoria". After the attack in New York City she painted the tableau NY 9/11 a series of 13 paintings, from which “Miserere Julianna” is going on display at the 9/11 Memorial Museum.

The series “Kafka, the visionary” a series of 64 paintings was exhibited in the Haus am Kleistpark (Berlin), Ariowitsch Haus(Leipzig) and Czech Center- Instituto Cervantes (Prag). José Saramago wrote about it “God has not read Kafka”.

Amongst the artists who had most marked her life Gandarias identified Velázquez, Goya and Bacon, along with her teacher and mentor Manuel Villaseñor.

She was a member of the Board of the Fundación Yehudi Menuhin Foundation (Spain) and of the Scientific Committee of the “Istituto Internazionale per l'Opera e la Poesia di Verona “ (UNESCO).

She was made a Chevalier des Arts et des Lettres in 2005 and was granted the Légion d'honneur of the French Republic in 2010.
