= Kruge (surname) =

Kruge is the surname of the following people:

- A. O. Kruge, commanding officer in 1865 of USS Anemone in the American Civil War
- Otilie Kruge (later Christensen), Norwegian manager (1865-8) of Framnæs shipyard
- Klaus von Storch Kruge (born 1962), Chilean aerospace engineer

== Fictional characters ==
- Kruge (Star Trek), Klingon commander in Star Trek III: The Search for Spock
- Mrs Kruge in Roarin' Dan, 1920 short film

== See also ==
- Kruge (disambiguation)
