= Jacob Schmitt =

German composer and piano teacher

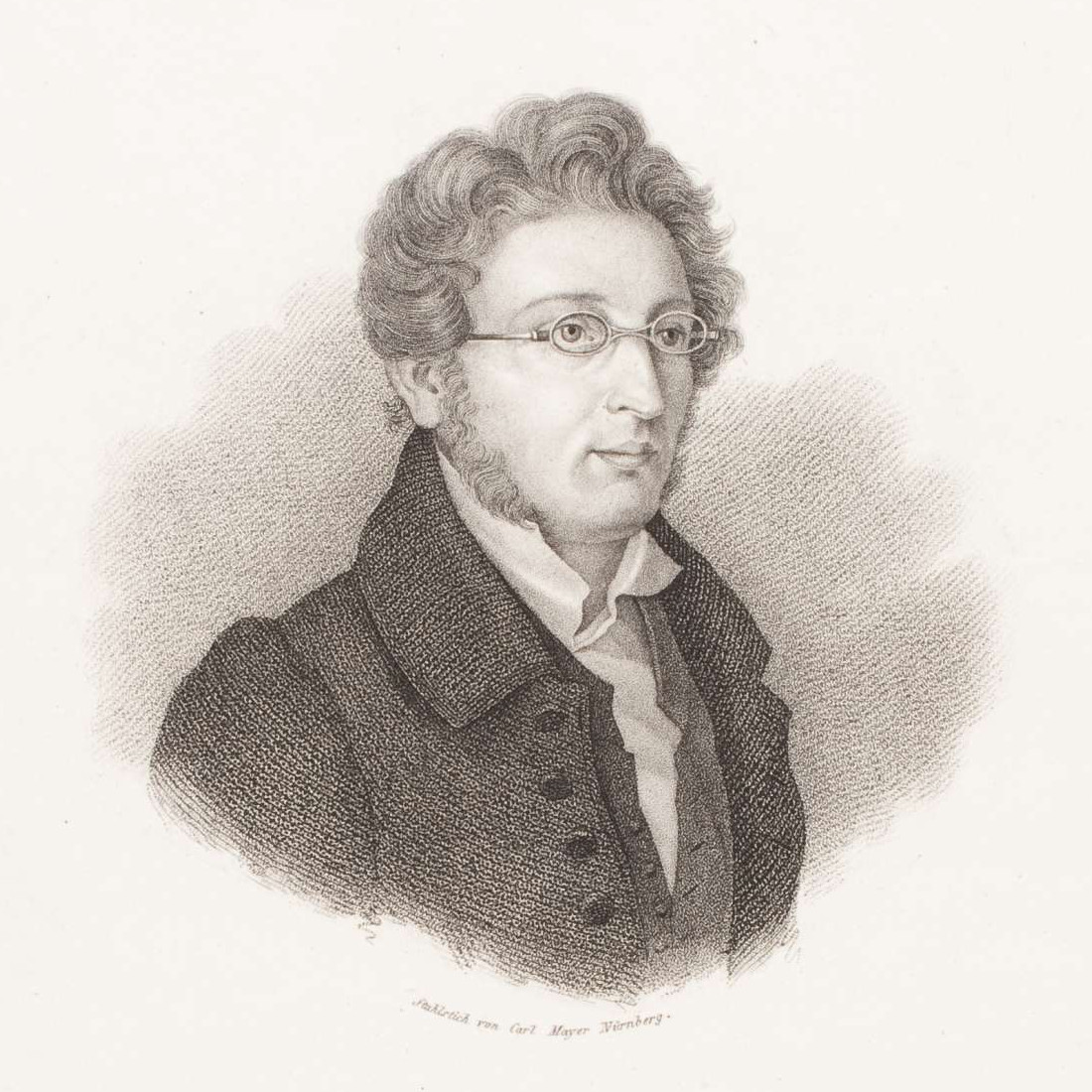
- Born: Jacob Schmitt; November 2, 1803; Obernburg, near Aschaffenburg, Germany
- Died: June 1853; Hamburg, Germany
- Other names: Jakob, Jaques, Jacques
- Occupations: Composer, piano teacher
- Known for: Piano compositions, teaching materials
- Notable work: Les charmes de Hambourg, Grande Fantaisie brillante Op. 225, Concert Op. 300
- Relatives: Aloys Schmitt (brother)

Jacob Schmitt, also called Jakob, Jaques or Jacques, (2 November 1803 – June 1853) was a German composer and piano teacher who worked in Hamburg. He was born in Obernburg near Aschaffenburg and died in Hamburg.

== Life ==
Jacob Schmitt was the youngest of the seven children of Franz Bartholomäus Schmitt and Anna Maria Scheller; his oldest brother was the composer Aloys Schmitt. His father was already an aspiring musician, who supported his salary as a teacher by being an organist in the town’s parish church St. Peter and Paul. He supported his sons musically, giving them their first musical lessons and making sure, that they were taken up in the house of the music publisher Johann Anton André in Offenbach. There, Schmitt was taught by André as well as his brother Aloys and had his first performances as a piano accompanist in 1814. At this time in the view of the public, he was the little brother of the already well-known Aloys whom he had a close relationship with.

Schmitt’s way into the world of the free music business began around 1823. This becomes clear from an exchange of letters with his former patron André. In these letters, Schmitt initially asked for the financing of a new grand piano offering André the rights to more compositions in return; after this request had been refused, Schmitt requested that at least his new works were included in André’s publishing and the support for a planned concert tour. He discovered that as an independent artist he no longer dealt with a patron but rather with a businessman and cooperation partner. At this time Schmitt stayed longer Mannheim where he taught the pianist Jakob Rosenhain.

Schmitt first visited Hamburg on a concert tour in 1825. There, he was received friendly by critics and settled in the city; public documents mention the years 1828/29, although contemporary sources already mention the year 1825. In 1827 Schmitt married the daughter of a merchant Henrica Worms in Obernburg. The first home of the Schmitt family in Hamburg was near the Altona's gate, subsequently Schmitt tried to endear the audience in Hamburg for example with his composition Les charmes de Hambourg which was his first composition published in Hamburg. For a short time, he was head of an orchestra association, the Apollo-Verein; but he resigned after a few years. His job as a teacher was more successful as he accompanied it with teaching materials for piano. Among his students were Diederich Krug, Henry Christian Timm and Otto Goldschmidt. The many moves into worse social areas of Hamburg as well as his letter correspondence at this time show that Schmitt lacked financial success. As a result, he dies lonely and poor in 1853.

== Works ==
Schmitt created over 330 works mainly for piano, amongst these numerous Sonatina, Divertissements, Nocturnes and other smaller pieces. These pieces are favoured in contemporary criticism. However, his only opera Alfred the Great (German:Alfred der Große) was not successful.

Robert Schumann was Schmitt’s most important contemporary critic. He saw Schmitt as a big talent, which never could or wanted to develop fully. Schumann especially valued Schmitt’s successful works like his concert op. 300 and the Grande Fantaisie brillante op. 225 as well as his teaching materials. As many critics of this time, he also compared Jakob to his brother Aloys Schmitt and concluded that Jacob had the greater talent, but Aloys was the superior artist and utilised his talent better. In the contemporary "Encyclopedia of the whole musical sciences or universal lexicon of the musical art" (German: “Encyclopädie der gesammten musikalischen Wissenschaften oder Universal-Lexikon der Tonkunst”) Aloys was also considered to be the more important artist. Only in the "Little musical conversations-lexicon" (German: "Kleinen musikalisches Conversations-Lexikon"), which was published by his musical publishing house in Hamburg and he was involved as an author, he was seen equally important to his brother.

== Literature ==
- Eric Erfurth (2006), "Jacob Schmitt", in Erich Schneider (ed.), Fränkische Lebensbilder, vol. 21, Würzburg: Gesellschaft für fränkische Geschichte, pp. 231–242, ISBN 3-86652-721-7
