= Arnold Krug =

German composer and teacher (1849–1904)

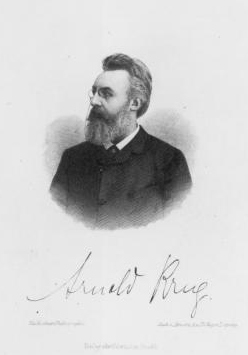

Arnold Krug (16 October 1849 – 14 August 1904) was a German composer and music teacher.

== Biography ==
Born in Hamburg, Krug began his music studies with piano lessons from his father, Diederich Krug, who was himself a pianist and composer. Later he was sent to the Leipzig Conservatory where he studied with Carl Reinecke and then went on to Berlin, where he continued with Friedrich Kiel and Eduard Franck. After completing his studies, he taught in Berlin at the Stern Conservatory for several years before returning to Hamburg where he remained for the rest of his life, working primarily as a music teacher and choral director. Gustav Jenner was among his many students.

== Music ==
While he wrote works in several different genres, including symphonies, orchestral overtures, operas, piano works, and chamber music, it is his choral works which received the most attention. However, today he is primarily remembered for his String Sextet in D Major, Op. 68.

This work was known as the "Prize Sextet" because Krug won the Stelzner Prize for chamber music with this composition. The Prize Sextet was originally for two violins, viola, violotta, cello and cellone, but the publisher of the work (Fritz Kistner) wisely hedged his bets and produced an edition for the standard combination of two violins, two violas and two cellos in addition to the so-called Stelzner version. Of this work, Wilhelm Altmann, the famous chamber music critic, has written:

“If not a masterpiece of the highest order from start to finish, Krug’s Sextet nonetheless comes away with high honors. He uses his themes skillfully and his sonorities are quite successful. The first movement, Allegro, begins with a short but powerful introduction which gives the impression of storms ahead. Instead, the main melody is quite genial and broad. Later, Krug cleverly weaves the introduction into the second theme and uses it as part of the coda. The second movement, Adagio tranquillo, is characterized by a calm, deeply felt melody, which is interrupted by an urgent and highly dramatic middle section. There is no scherzo, but the lively first theme to the finale, Allegro, seems to fill this gap. A quieter and more lyrical second theme provides excellent contrast.”

== Works (selection) ==
=== Symphonies ===
- Symphony No. 1 in B minor, WoO (1866)
- Symphony No. 2 in C major, Op. 9 (1877)

=== Orchestral ===
- Tragödienouvertüre, WoO (1860s)
- Symphonic Concert Ouverture on the Nibelungenlied, WoO (1870s)
- Symphonic Prologue to Shakespeare’s "Othello", Op. 27 (1884)
- Orchestral Suite, Aus der Wanderzeit (1890)
- Romanische Tänze for Orchestra (1881)

=== Choir and orchestra ===
- The May Queen (La régine Avrillouse), for women's choir and orchestra, Op. 10 (1877)
- Der Abend, for mixed choir and orchestra or piano, Op. 15 (1879)
- Sigurd Poem on Emanuel Geibel Epos König Sigurd’s Brautfahrt for soloists, choir and orchestra (1883)
- Fingal, Poem on a text by Theodor von Souchay for soloists, male choir and orechstra, Op. 43 (1891)
- Der Künste Lobgesang: „Allmacht Gottes erschuf die Natur“, cantata for mezzo-soprano, male choir and orchestra, Op. 86 (1900)

=== Solo instruments and orchestra ===
- Italienische Reiseskizzen for violin and string orchestra, op. 12 (1878)
- Liebesnovelle, and Idyll in four parts, Op. 14, for harp ad lib and string orchestra (1878)
- Romanze for violin and orchestra (also piano), op. 73 (Tivadar Nachéz dedicated)
- Nomadenzug, „Abgegrast die Haide steht“ for piano, male chorus, and orchestra, WoO (1878)

=== Choral ===
- Lobgesang, Cantata, WoO (1900)
- The March of Death for male choir, Op. 100 (1906)

=== Chamber music ===
- Piano Quartet in C minor, Op. 17 (1879)
- Serenade (Sextet), Op. 34 (1887)
- String Sextet in D major, Op. 68 (1897)
- String Quartet in F major, Op. 96 (1900)

== Bibliography ==
- J. Sittard: Geschichte des Musik und des Concertwesens in Hamburg (Altona, 1890)
- Wilhelm Altmann: Handbuch fũr Streichquartettspieler (Wilhelmshaven, 1972)
- "Arnold Krug String Sextet in D Major, Op.68". Edition Silvertrust. Sound-bites and short biography.

Some of the information on this page appears on the website of Edition Silvertrust but permission has been granted to copy, distribute and/or modify this document under the terms of the GNU Free Documentation License.
