= Gernikako Arbola =

Oak tree symbolising Biscayan Basque freedoms

Coordinates: 43°18′53″N 2°40′47″W

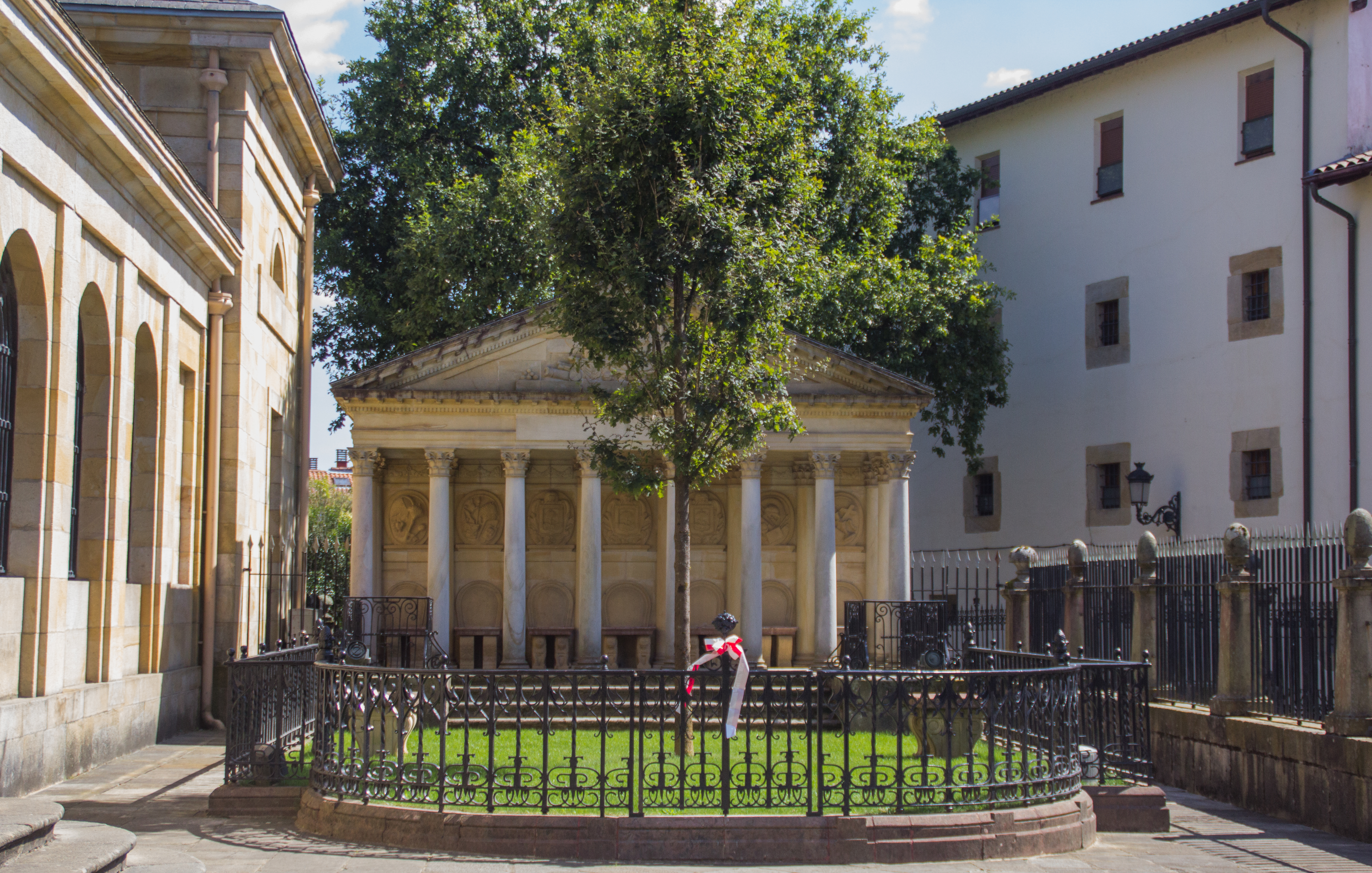
The "new tree"

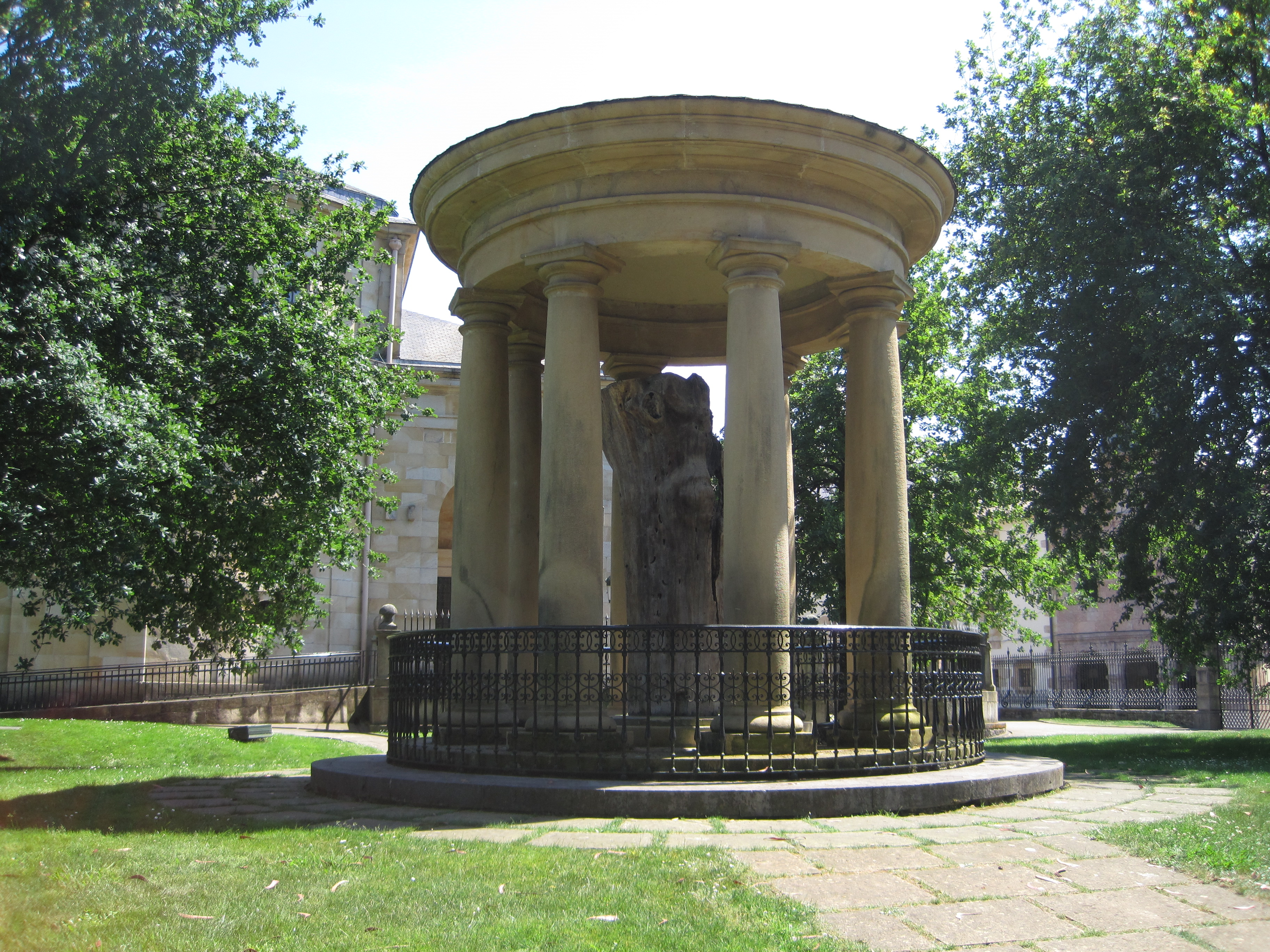
The trunk of the "Old Tree"

Gernikako Arbola ('the Tree of Gernika' in Basque) is an oak tree that symbolizes traditional freedoms for the Biscayan people, and by extension for the Basque people as a whole. It is located in Gernika, Biscay, Basque Country, Spain. The Lords of Biscay (including kings of Castile and Carlist pretenders to the throne) swore to respect the Biscayan liberties under it, and the modern Lehendakari of the Basque Country swears his charge there.

== Dynasty ==
In the Middle Ages, representatives of the villages of Biscay would hold assemblies under local big trees. As time passed, the role of separate assemblies was superseded by the Guernica Assembly in 1512, and its oak would acquire a symbolic meaning, with actual assemblies being held in a purpose-built hermitage-house (the current building dates from 1833). The Spanish regent Maria Christina, accompanied by her infant daughter Queen Isabella II, was the last Spanish monarch to swear an oath to the charters under the iconic oak in 1839.

The known specimens form a dynasty:

- "the father", planted in the 14th century, lasted 450 years
- the "old tree" (1742–1892), re-planted in 1811. The trunk now is held in a templet in the surrounding garden.
- the third (1858–2004), re-planted in 1860, survived the Bombing of Guernica in 1937 but had to be replaced because of a fungus. The gardeners of the Biscayan government keep several spare trees grown from the tree's acorns.
- the fourth (1986–2015) was replanted on the site of its father on 25 February 2005. It died of a humidity related disease on 15 January 2015.
- the fifth was planted in March 2015, aged 14.

The Tree of Gernika came to prominence during the First and Third Carlist Wars as a symbol of Basque liberties, with its renown and appreciation spreading throughout the Basque diaspora in the late 19th and mid-20th centuries, thanks to the popularity of José María Iparragirre's namesake anthem. María Cristina of Savoy, regent during her daughter Isabel's minority in the First Carlist War, swore to uphold the Basque charters under the oak in 1839.

The tree's significance is illustrated by an event which occurred shortly after the Guernica bombings. When the Francoist troops took the town, the Tercio of Begoña, formed by Carlist volunteers from Biscay, put an armed guard around the tree to protect it against their Falangist allies, who had wanted to fell this symbol of Basque nationalism. On 26 June 1950, Xavier of Bourbon-Parma, Carlist claimant to the Spanish throne during Franco's dictatorial regime, swore the Basque charters in the Oak of Guernica.

An oak tree is depicted on the heraldic arms of Biscay and subsequently on the arms of many of the towns of Biscay. An oak leaf logo is used by the local government of Biscay. The logo of the Basque nationalist party Eusko Alkartasuna has one half red and the other green, the colors of the Basque flag. An old version of the logo of the Basque nationalist youth organisation Jarrai also display oak leaves. The Basque authorities present descendants of the tree as a symbol of friendship to Basque diaspora groups and related cities.

Arms of Biscay	The coat of arms of Gernika-Lumo	The logo of the University of the Basque Country, with Eduardo Chillida's interpretation of the oak	An early version of football club Athletic Bilbao's crest with the tree and city icons

The oak leaves and acorns around the coat of arms of the Basque Country are another reference to the tree.

== Other fuero trees in Biscay ==
- Árbol Malato in Luiaondo, another tree of special significance for the Basques.
- The Abellaneda oak for the Encartaciones Juntas.
- The Gerediaga oak for the Durango area.
- The Aretxabalagana oak, where Biscaynes had to receive their lord when he came to put his oath on the fuero under the Gernika oak.

== See also ==
- Upstalsboom, the meeting place of the Frisians and symbol of the Frisian freedom.
- List of individual trees
