= Etienne Krug =

Belgian physician and epidemiologist

Etienne G. Krug
- Born: Belgium
- Education: Université catholique de Louvain; Harvard University
- Occupations: Physician, epidemiologist
- Known for: Injury prevention Violence prevention
- Medical career
- Institutions: World Health Organization; Centers for Disease Control and Prevention

Etienne G. Krug is a Belgian physician and epidemiologist known for his research on injury and violence prevention. He has been the director of the Department for Management of Noncommunicable Diseases, Disability, Violence and Injury Prevention (NVI) at the World Health Organization (WHO) since the Department's founding in September 2014. In this capacity, he directs the WHO's efforts at preventing injuries and diabetes, among other medical conditions.

== Education and career ==
Krug received his medical degree from the Université catholique de Louvain and his master's degree in public health from Harvard University. Before becoming the director of the NVI, he was the director of the Department of Violence and Injury Prevention and Disability at the WHO from 2000 to 2014. Before joining the WHO, he was a medical epidemiologist in the Centers for Disease Control and Prevention's Division of Violence Prevention from 1995 to 1999. He had previously worked in war-torn countries like Mozambique and Nicaragua for eight years on behalf of humanitarian organizations, including Médecins sans Frontières and the United Nations High Commissioner for Refugees.
