= Kruge =

Kruge may refer to:

- Kruge (surname)
- Kruge, a street and district in Zagreb, Croatia
- Kruge, Lika-Senj County, a village in Croatia
- Kruge, a Klingon commander from the film Star Trek III: The Search for Spock (1984)
