= Diederich Krug =

German pianist and composer

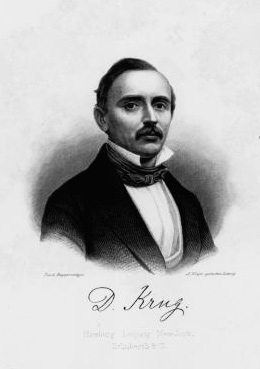

Diederich Krug (25 May 1821 – 7 April 1880) was a German pianist and composer. He was born in Hamburg and studied under Jacob Schmitt. He wrote a large number of pieces for piano, around 350 in all, which were popular with amateur pianists. Typical examples are gathered in the Pianoforte-Album which appeared as No. 1220 in the Collection Litolff; it contains eight works: Chant d'Adieu (Op. 307), Le petit Chevalier (Op. 312 No. 2), Einsames Haideblümchen (Op. 329, No. 2), La petite Coquette (Op. 306), Minnelied (Op. 289), Tyrolienne (Op. 308, No. 1), Der Wachtelruf (Op. 317 No. 2), and Impromptu-Romance (Op. 286).

He was the father of Arnold Krug.
