= Ludwig Krug =

German goldsmith, engraver, and sculptor

- Born: 1488
- Died: 1532 (aged 43–44)
- Occupations: Goldsmith, engraver, and sculptor

Ludwig Krug (1488 – 1532) was a German goldsmith, engraver, and sculptor. Together with Wenzel Jamnitzer, he is considered among the most important goldsmiths of the 16th century in what is now Germany.

== Biography ==
There is little information about Krug's life and artistic training. Son of the engraver Hans Krug the Elder, Ludwig Krug mainly worked in the Free Imperial City of Nuremberg, obtaining the title of master goldsmith in 1522. While attribution of his work as a metalworker are controversial due to a lack of signature, there is more certainty about his career as an engraver thanks to the preservation of two woodcuts and sixteen copper engravings on religious subjects.

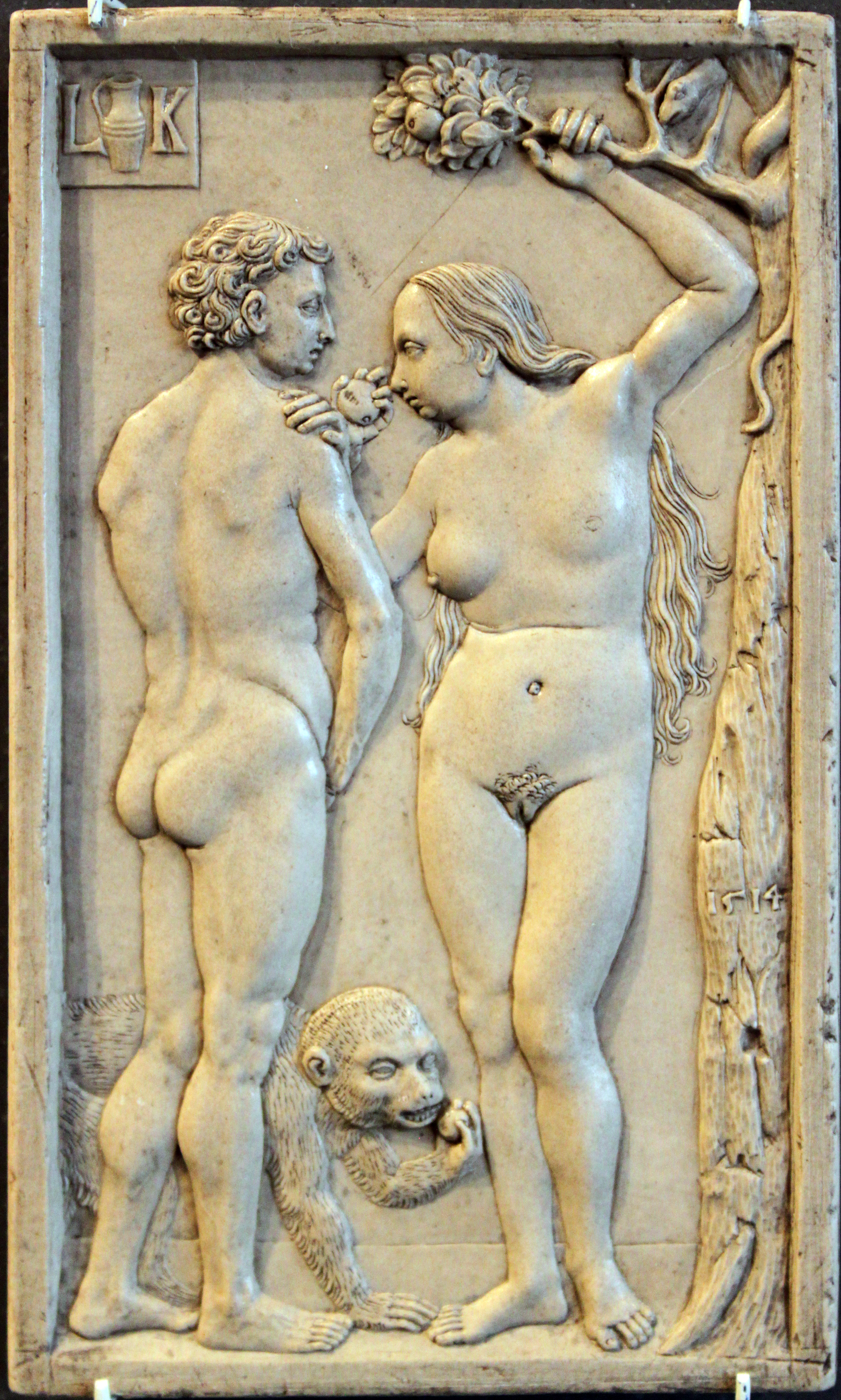
Adam and Eve: The Fall of Man by Krug

Krug's prints were developed in a style that, starting from a youthful phase inspired by the models of Albrecht Dürer, Martin Schongauer, and Lucas van Leyden, gradually distanced itself from these artists. In a later creative period, he gravitated towards the decorative models of Augsburg represented by Hans Schwarz, which were characterized by a certain originality and liveliness. Krug's works were characterized by naturalistic design and a mixture of Italian decorative elements of late Gothic art.

In the last years of his career, Krug dedicated himself to goldsmithing, evidenced by a preserved illustration of a ciborium from Aschaffenburg depicting Mary and Joseph dated to 1526, as well as an illustration of the lid of a cup depicting the Labours of Hercules.

Among his works are mugs at the Germanisches Nationalmuseum, the lid of a cup preserved in the Museum of Fine Arts in Budapest, a golden cup in the treasury of the Basilica of Saint Anthony of Padua, and numerous medals from his time as an engraver at the Nuremberg mint. Krug's Solnhofen Limestone relief depicting Adam and Eve in the fall of man resides at the Bode Museum in Berlin. Krug's version of the fall of man features an ape mimicking Adam eating the apple, which symbolizes the yearning of flesh as the cause of the fall.
