= Crug =

Crug is a Welsh word meaning barrow, cairn, or hillock.

It may also refer to:

== Places ==
- Bryn-crug, Wales
- Crug, Monmouthshire
- Crug Eryr Castle
- Crûg Farm Quarry
- Crug Hywel
- Crug Mawr
- Pant-y-crug

== Events ==
- Battle of Crug Mawr

== See also ==
- Krug (disambiguation)
