= Lander Euba =

Spanish bicycle racer (born 1977)

Personal information
- Full name: Lander Euba Ziarrusta
- Born: 15 October 1977 (age 49) Guernica, Spain

Cycling career
- Sport: Cycling
- Current team: Retired
- Discipline: Road
- Role: Rider

Amateur teams
- 1998–2001: Olarra–Ercoreca
- 2001: Euskaltel–Euskadi (stagiaire)

Professional teams
- 2002–2003: Euskaltel–Euskadi
- 2004: Costa de Almería–Paternina

Lander Euba Ziarrusta (born 15 October 1977) is a Spanish former professional road cyclist.

== Major results ==
2001
1st Overall Vuelta a Alava

1st Stage 2

2nd Overall Vuelta Ciclista a León
2003
2nd Overall Troféu Joaquim Agostinho

1st Stage 1
