= Hillock =

Small hill

A hillock or knoll is a small hill, usually separated from a larger group of hills such as a range. Hillocks are similar in their distribution and size to small mesas or buttes. This particular formation occurs often in Great Britain and China. A similar type of landform in the Scandinavian countries goes by the name "kulle" or "bakke" (depending on the country) and is contrary to the above phenomena formed when glaciers polish down hard, crystalline bedrock of gneiss or granites, leaving a rounded rocky hillock with sparse vegetation.

One of the most famous knolls is the one near John F. Kennedy's point of assassination, the grassy knoll, in Dealey Plaza of downtown Dallas, Texas. It is the source of many prominent conspiracy theories regarding the circumstances of his assassination.

A "blind knoll" is either hidden or not readily apparent to those driving vehicles. There are road signs that warn of this, advising drivers to slow down.

== Gallery ==
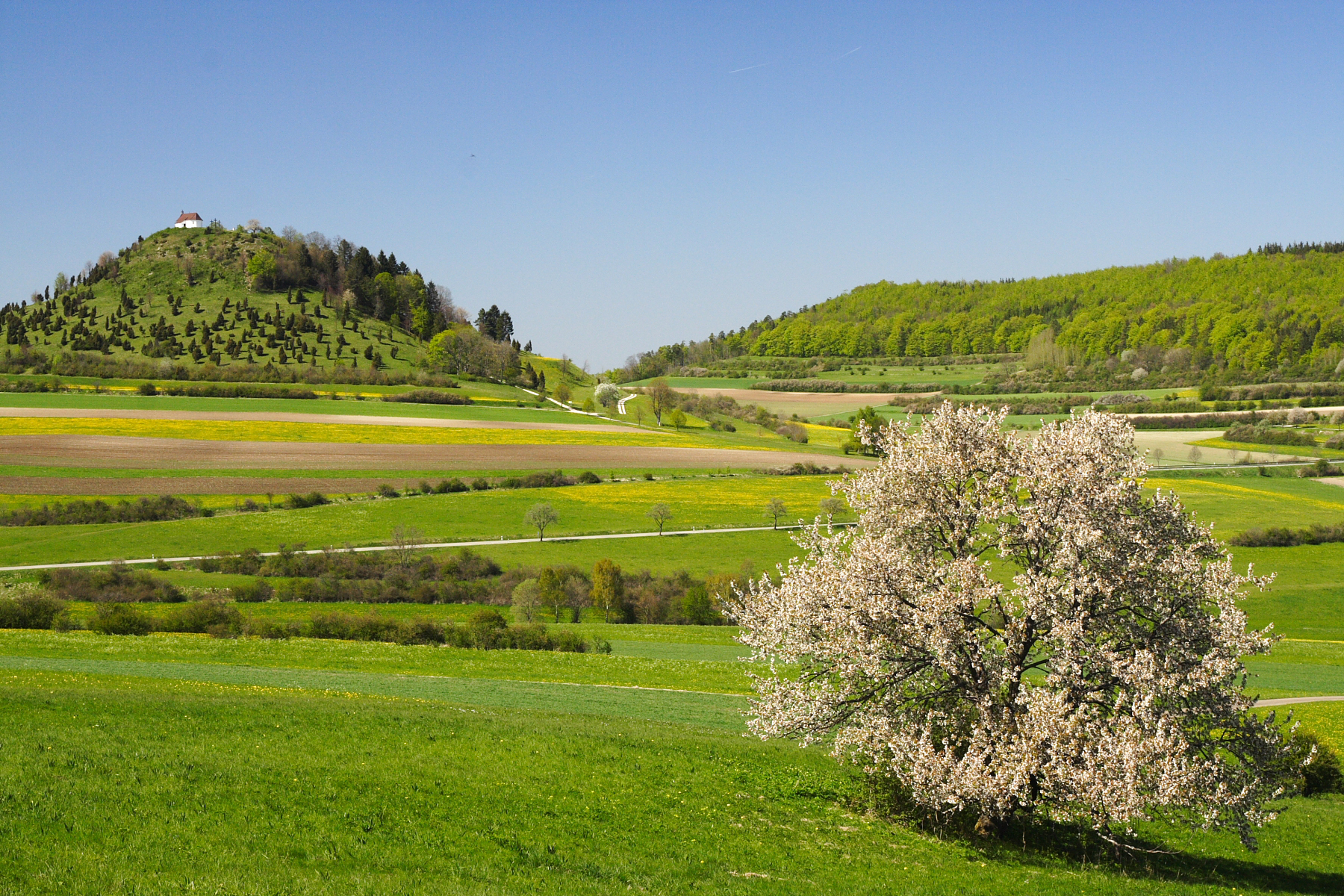

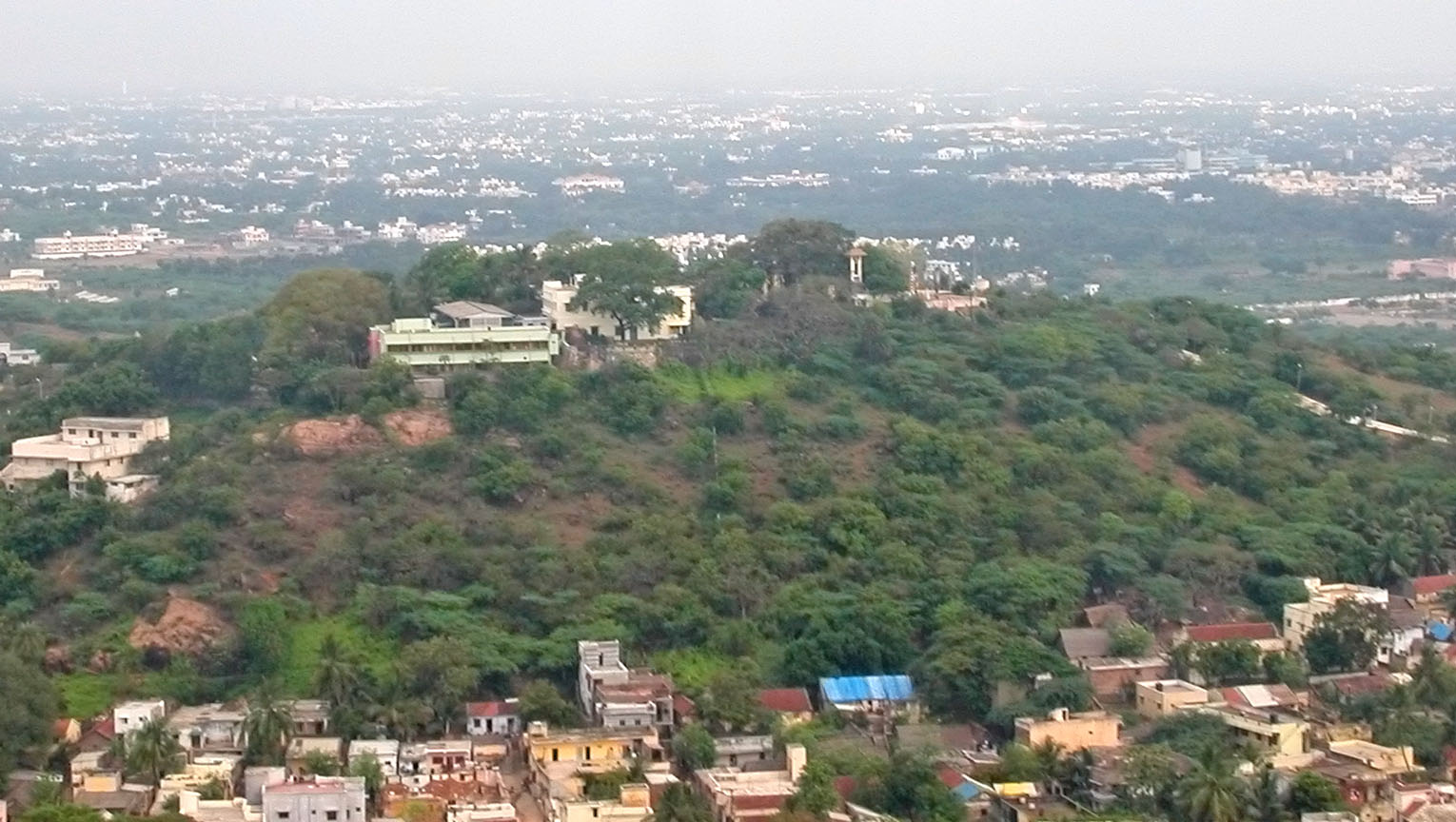

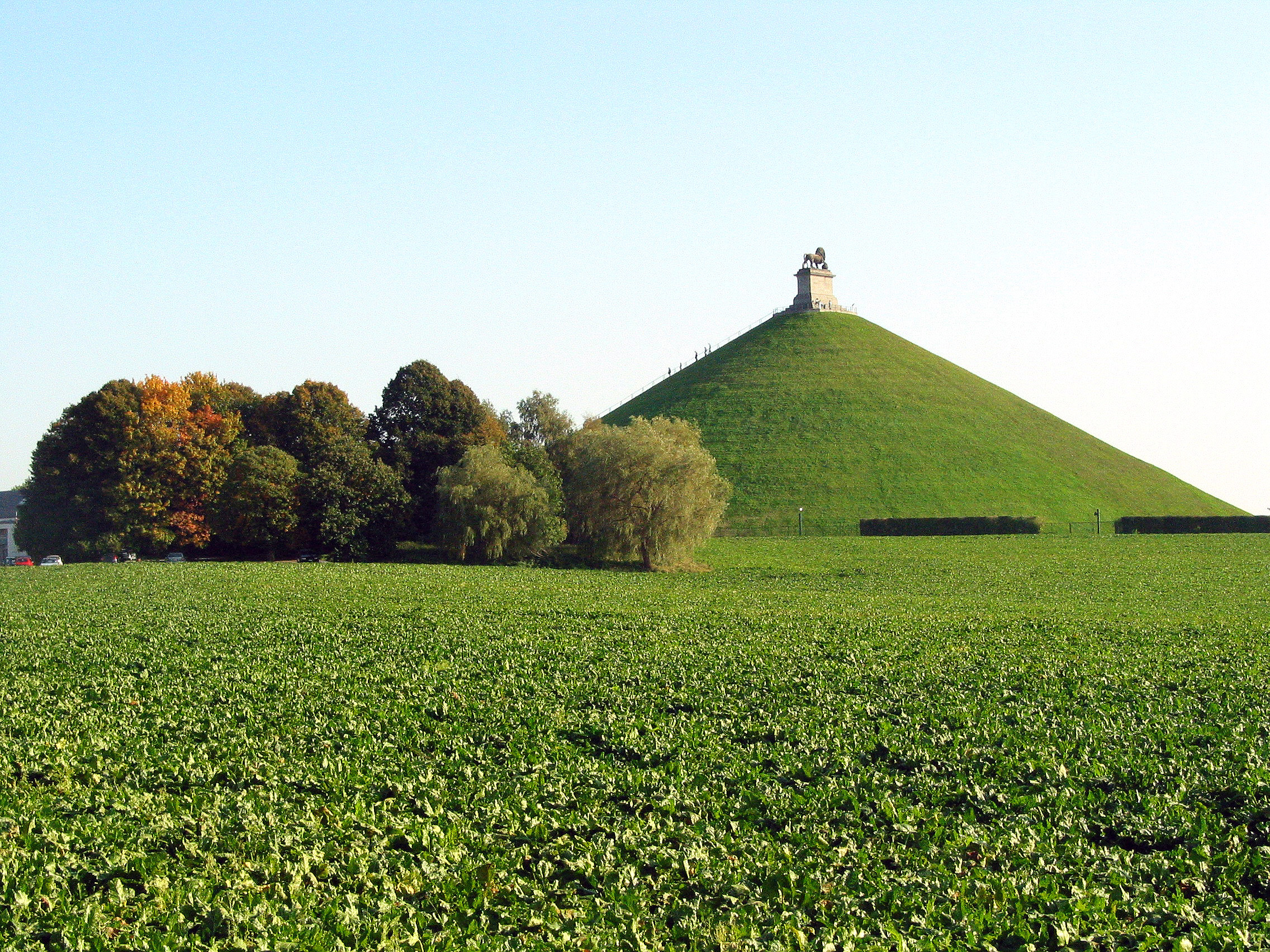

== See also ==
- Crug (disambiguation)
- Mound – Heaped pile of earth, gravel, sand, rocks, or debris
- Mountain – Large natural elevation of the Earth's surface
- Hügelland – Landscape consisting of low, rolling hills
