= Édouard Jaguer =

French poet and art critic

Édouard Jaguer (8 August 1924, Paris – Paris 9 May 2006) was a French poet and art critic linked with the surrealist movement including Maurice Blanchard, Laurence Iché, Régine Raufast, Robert Rius and Tita.

== Revues ==
He was involved with many groups and revues including:

- La Main a la Plume
- La Revolution la Nuit
- le Surrealisme-Revolutionaire
- Rixes
- COBRA
- Phases
- Boa
- Il Gesto
- Salamande
- La Breche
- Aujourd'hui
- XXme Siecle
- Ellebore
- Les Deux Soeurs
- La Tour du Feu
- La Nef

== Bibliography ==
- La Poutre creuse (1950) - poetry
- La Nuit est faite pour ouvrir les portes (1955) - poetry
- Le Mur derrière le mur (1958) - poetry
- Regards obliques sur une histoire parallèle (1977) - poetry
- Les Mystères de la chambre noire (Flammarion, 1983) - surrealist photography
- Das Surrealistiche gedichte (German, 1985) - poetry anthology
- Le Surréalisme face à la littérature (Le Temps qu'il fait, Cognac, 1989)
- L’Excès dans la mesure (1995) - poetry
- Cobra au cœur du XXe siècle (Galilée, Paris 1997)
- L’Envers de la panoplie (Syllepse, "Libre espace", 2000) - poetry
- Monographies on Alechinsky, Baj, Cornell, Freddie, Gallizioli, Gironella, Jom, Lacomblez, Margonari, Perahim, Oelze, Pozzati, Remedios Varo and Revilla.
