= The Tree of Gernika =

1938 book

- Author: G. L. Steer
- Subject: Non-fiction
- Publisher: Hodder
- Publication date: 1938
- Pages: 400

The Tree of Gernika is a personal account of the Basque campaign of the Spanish Civil War by London Times correspondent G. L. Steer.

== Overview ==
The book is known for its description of the 1937 bombing of Guernica. The author was previously known for his reportage on the Second Italo-Ethiopian War. The book includes photographs and maps. Its photographs were especially powerful in spreading news of the event. Steer was one of four foreign journalists in the area and was partially responsible for spreading news of the attack contrary to Franco, who at first denied that the attack had occurred. The book's criticism of Franco Nationalism, particularly the 1937 bombing of Guernica, prevented its publication within Spain. The book's Basque translation was published by exiles in Caracas in 1963. Foreign Affairs called The Tree of Gernika a "reportorial masterpiece in its vividness, insight and authenticity" and recommended it for Franco adherents.

== Bibliography ==
- Black, Jeremy (April 2008). "Contesting the Past". History. 93 (310): 224–254. doi:10.1111/j.1468-229X.2008.00422.x. ISSN 0018-2648. EBSCOhost 31167158.
- Cunningham, Valentine (2009). "The Spanish Civil War". In McLoughlin, Kate (ed.). The Cambridge Companion to War Writing. Cambridge, United Kingdom, Cambridge: Cambridge University Press. pp. 185–196. ISBN 978-0-521-89568-2. ProQuest 2138003376.
- Evans, Robin (March 2005). "Gernikako Arbola (The Tree of Gernika)". History Review (51): 3. ISSN 0962-9610. EBSCOhost 16260459.
- Woolbert, Robert Gale (October 1938). "Recent Books on International Relations". Foreign Affairs. 17 (1): 176–192. doi:10.2307/20028913. ISSN 0015-7120. JSTOR 20028913. EBSCOhost 14780773.
