= Ufa Tonwoche =

German newsreel program (1925–1940)

Ufa Tonwoche was a German weekly newsreel program that ran from September 1925 until July 1940.

== History ==
Ufa Tonwoche was created by Universum Film AG after the merger of the Decla and Messter newsreels in September 1925. In 1927 the German industrialist, financier, and politician Alfred Hugenberg bought Ufa saving it from bankruptcy. Hugenberg used the newsreel to foster support for Adolf Hitler. In 1930 the first edition of Ufa Tonwoche with sound was created, and by 1933 most Ufa Tonwoche newsreels featured sound. In 1937, Cautio Treuhandsgesellschaft, a German government front-company, bought a controlling stake (72.6%) of Ufa in a deal negotiated by Max Winkler, bringing the newsreel under government control. In July 1940 the four major German newsreel programs, of which Ufa Tonwoche was one (together with the Tobis-Wochenschau, Deulig-Wochenschau, and Twentieth Century Fox), were consolidated into a single newsreel program, Die Deutsche Wochenschau by Joseph Goebbels.

Newsreels included subjects such as the bombing of Guernica in 1937 and Hitler's 50th birthday.

As well as Germany, Ufa Tonwoche was shown in Austria, Czechoslovakia, Finland, Hungary, and the Netherlands. Copies of the newsreel are preserved in the Bundesarchiv at Koblenz.

Certain issues of the Ufa Tonwoche, such as Ufa Ton-Woche 471/38/1939, gained greater notoriety as excerpts from them were later incorporated into documentary and propaganda films.
