= George Steer =

South African-born British journalist

Lt Col George Steer
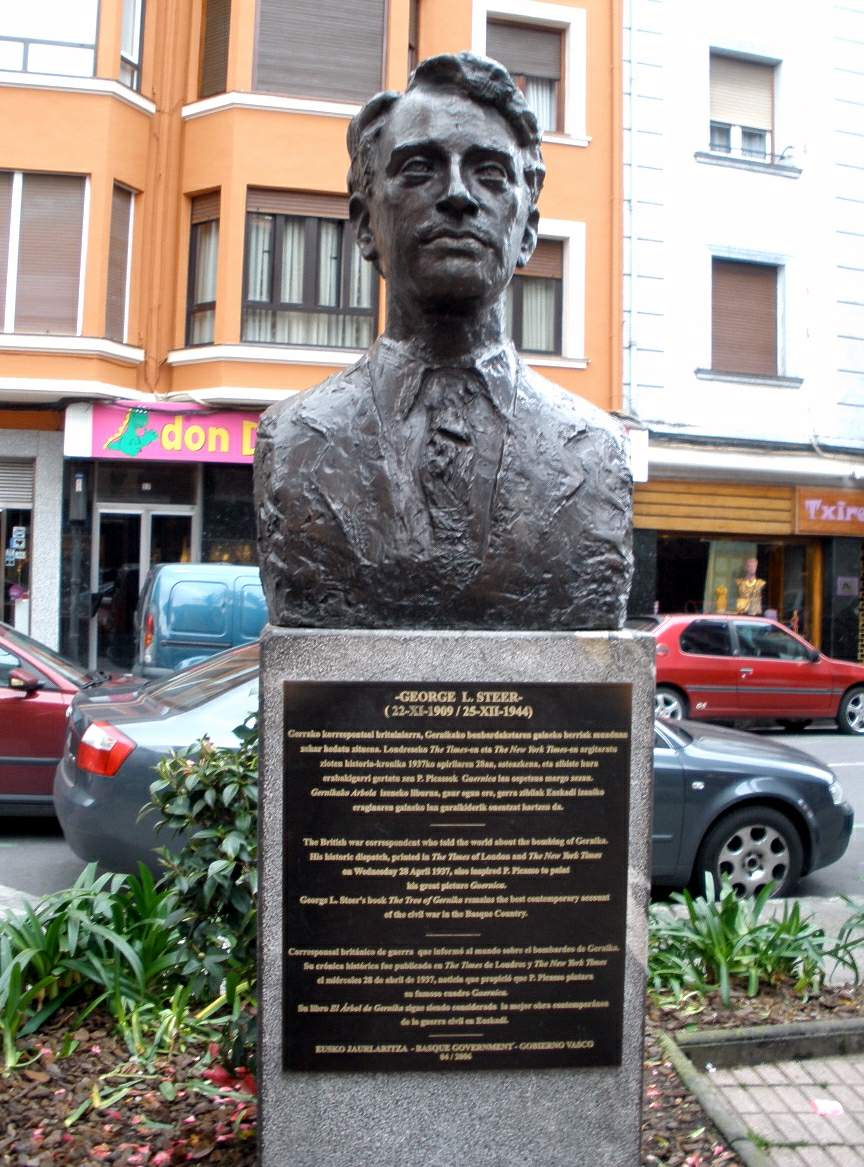
- Memorial to George Steer in Guernica, Spain
- Born: 22 November 1909; East London, South Africa
- Died: 25 December 1944 (aged 35); Fagu, West Bengal
- Cause of death: Car crash
- Resting place: Rangamati (then known as Rungamuttee), Bangladesh
- Education: Christ Church, Oxford
- Occupations: Journalist, war correspondent, propagandist and author
- Employer(s): The Times, The Daily Telegraph, Special Operations Executive
- Notable work: Caesar in Abyssinia (1936), The Tree of Gernika: a Field Study of Modern War (1938), Judgement on German Africa (1939), Sealed and Delivered (1942)
- Spouse(s): Margarita Herrero (married 1936-1937), Barbara Esmé Barton (married 1939)
- Parent(s): Bernard Augustine Steer, Emma Cecilia Armitage Nutt

George Lowther Steer (22 November 1909 – 25 December 1944) was a South African-born British journalist, author and war correspondent who reported on wars preceding the Second World War, especially the Second Italo-Ethiopian War and the Spanish Civil War. During those wars, he was employed by The Times, and his eyewitness reports did much to alert Western nations of war crimes committed by the Italians in Ethiopia and by the Germans in Spain although little was done to prevent them by the League of Nations. His 1937 exclusive on the bombing of Guernica inspired Pablo Picasso to paint his anti-war masterpiece, Guernica. He returned to Ethiopia after the start of the Second World War and helped the campaign that defeated the Italians and restored Hailie Selassie to the throne.

== Early life ==
George Steer was born in South Africa in 1909, the son of a newspaper manager. He studied classics in England, at Winchester College and Christ Church, Oxford. He began his journalistic career in South Africa and then worked in London for the Yorkshire Post.

== War correspondent ==
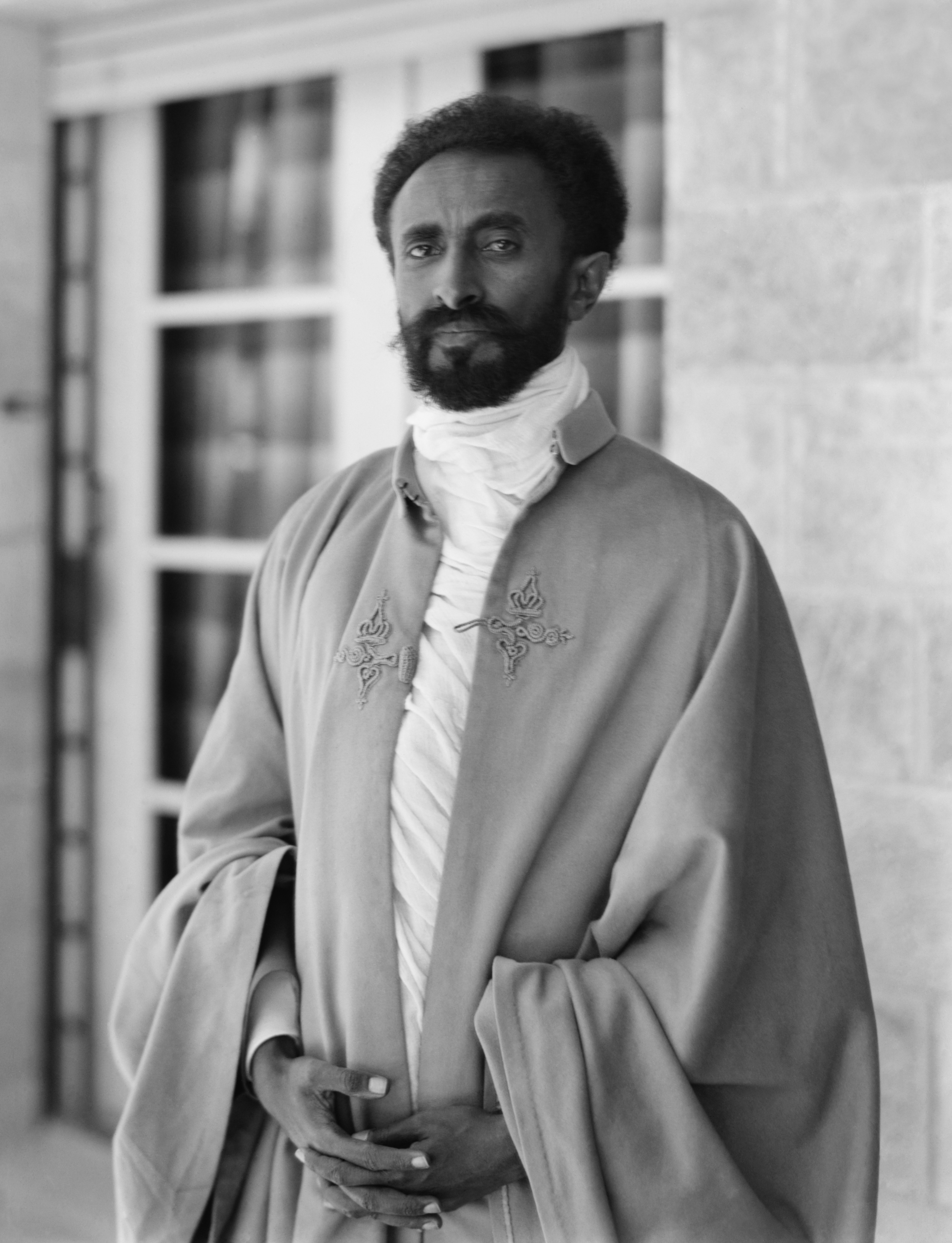
Haile Selassie I of Ethiopia

Convinced of the imminent Italian invasion of Ethiopia, Steer managed to get The Times to hire him as a special correspondent in Addis Ababa, where he arrived at the end of June 1935 via Djibouti, in French Somaliland. Settled in at the Imperial Hotel, where other foreign correspondents were staying. He quickly began to learn the local language, Amharic, and even managed to personally interview the Emperor of Ethiopia, Haile Selassie. It was the beginning of a close personal relationship that would last until Steer's death in 1944 (Selassie, in exile in London, would become the godfather of his son). Before the Italian invasion, which began in early October 1935, Steer had already warned that "unless the League of Nations gets its act together and stops Mussolini, there is going to be a massacre. These people are still living in the age of spears. That’s all they have: spears."

With the war ending in an Italian victory, Steer wrote the book Caesar in Abyssinia, in which he intended to "show the strength and spirit of the Ethiopian armies sent to fight against a great European power. My conclusions are that they had no artillery or aircraft, a pathetic proportion of automatic weapons, rifles, and ammunition for two days of modern warfare. I have seen a childlike nation ruled by a noble and intelligent man, massacred almost before it had begun to breathe." "I arrived here young, I left old, and I swore that I could never forgive or forget". He met and married his first wife in Ethiopia, under difficult conditions in the British Legation in Addis Ababa, with looting and rifle fire outside the gates of the compound. After the city had fallen to Italian troops, Steer was then expelled from Ethiopia, accused of "espionage and anti-Italian propaganda" for British intelligence and of having transported gas masks for Ethiopian troops, as well as having collaborated in the bombing of a road. His wife and his first child died in childbirth in London a little later.

=== Spanish Civil War ===
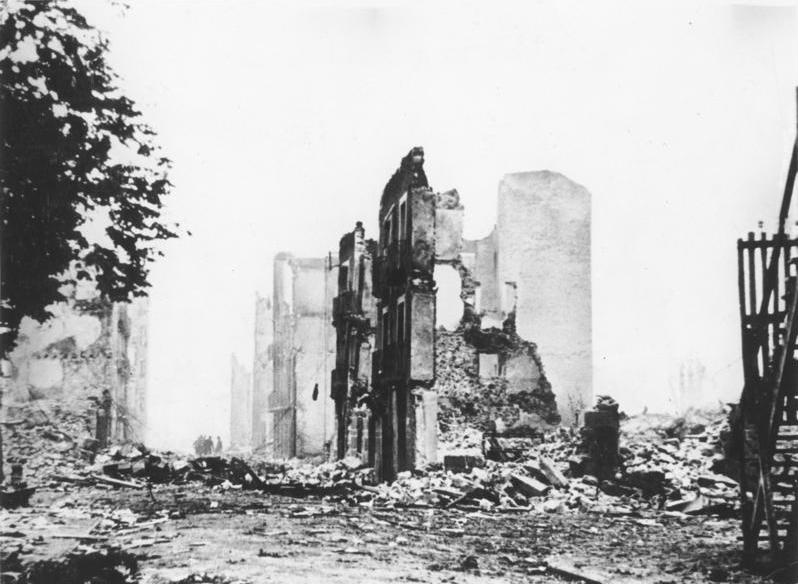
Ruins of Guernica

In 1937, Steer was sent to report on the Spanish Civil War. His first reports from the Basque Country described how British merchant ships beat the Nationalist blockade of Bilbao to bring food to the starving people of the town and surrounding region. He also visited the front line on several occasions to report directly on the fighting.

He won prominence with his scoop report on the bombing of Guernica on 26 April 1937. His telegram to London described German bomb casings (inscribed with the words Rheindorf 1936 with the German eagle insignia) and the use of thermite as an incendiary to create a firestorm in the centre of the town. High-explosive bombs were used to create blast damage to wooden structures, which could then be ignited more easily by the incendiaries. His reporting did much to inspire Pablo Picasso to record the atrocity for posterity in his massive 1937 painting Guernica. It also alerted Western nations to the way the Germans were preparing to use terror bombing to intimidate civilians.

His reports were directly contradicted by the Nationalists, who said that the damage had been caused by the Republican forces themselves, as they had at Irun earlier in the conflict; a League of Nations investigation concluded that neither the terror bombing theory nor the Nationalist version of intentional arson was accurate. Steer responded to such reports by providing details of the damage in the town such as bomb craters and the Luftwaffe aircraft used in the attack such as Heinkel He 111 bombers. Although he was not an eyewitness to the bombing itself, he arrived soon afterward, saw the effects and talked to some of the survivors. He was one of the last journalists to leave Bilbao as the Nationalists advanced and fled to Santander, to the west.

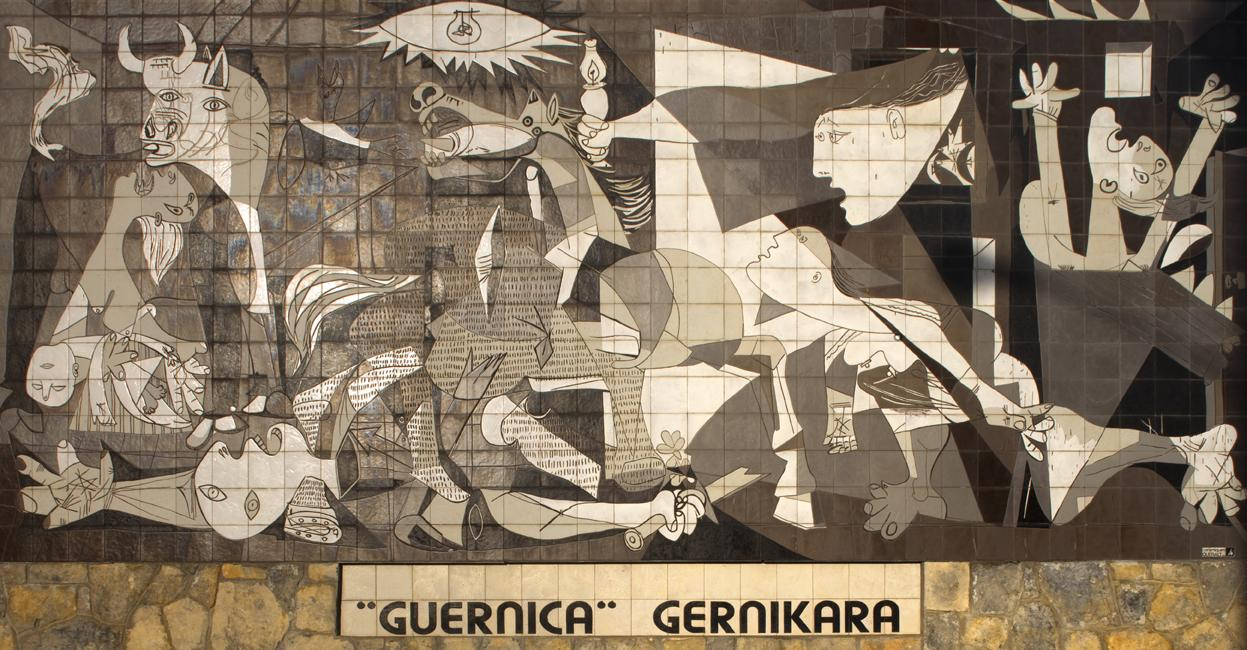
A tiled wall in Gernika claims "Guernica" Gernikara, "The Guernica (painting) to Gernika."

=== Winter War in Finland ===
The antifascist tone of Steer's reporting led The Times to dispense with his services. The newspaper's editorial stance on the war was anti-Republican, and its editor, Geoffrey Dawson, privately sympathised with the Nationalists, led by Francisco Franco. However, the newspaper had a general policy of appeasement when it came to Germany, Nazis and fascists. Steer returned to South Africa and in his book Judgment on German Africa documented Germany's attempts to subvert its former African colonies, especially the Cameroon, South West Africa (now Namibia), Tanganyika (now in Tanzania) and Togoland (now part of Ghana and Togo).

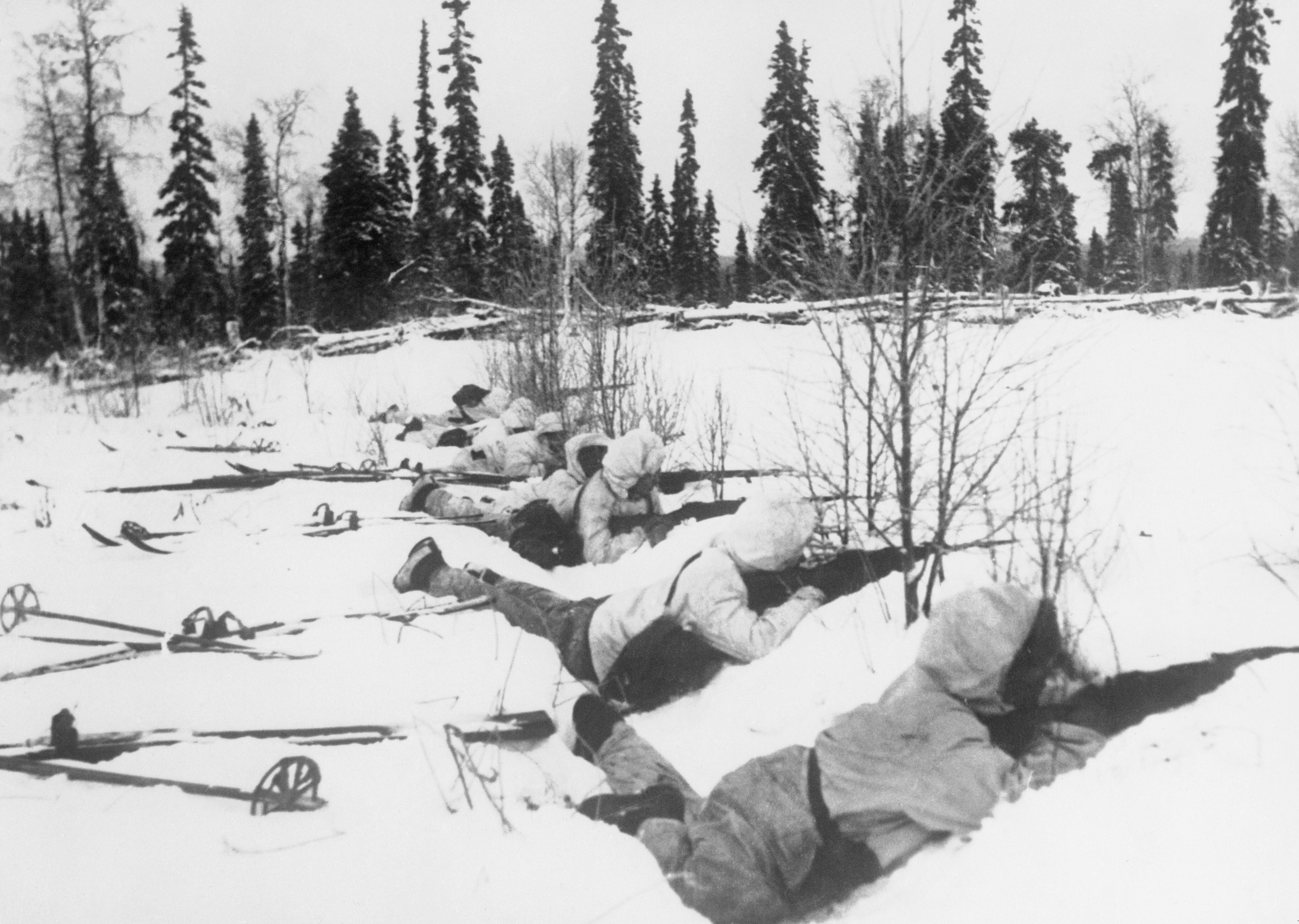
Finnish ski troops in Northern Finland on 12 January 1940.

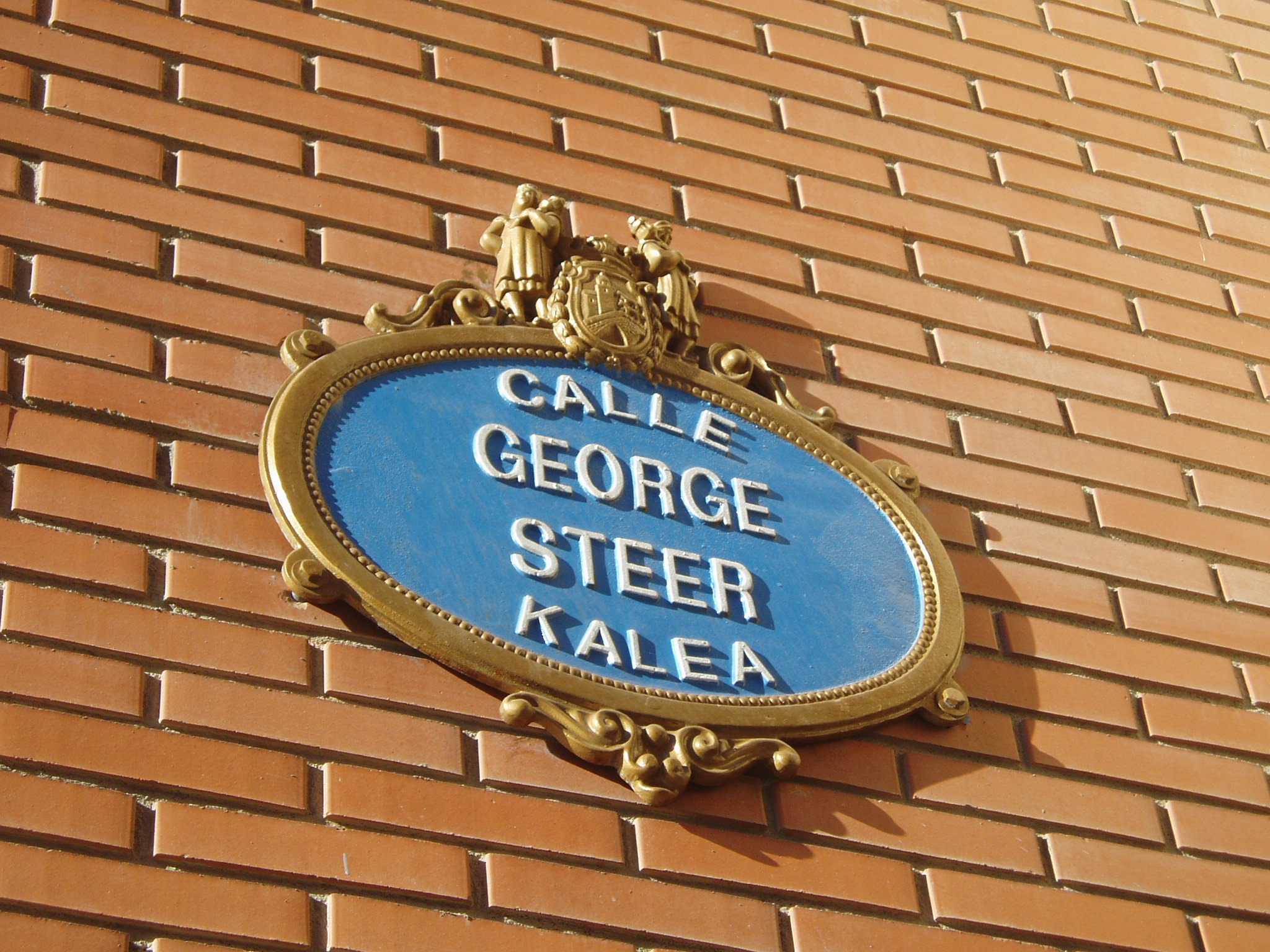
Street signal in Bilbao (Spain).

After the outbreak of the Second World War, the Daily Telegraph dispatched Steer to Finland to cover the Winter War, when the country was attacked by the Soviet Union in November 1939. Steer saw the effects of aerial bombing of several Finnish towns by the Soviets, attempts made to intimidate the population, just like at Guernica. However, unlike for Ethiopia and Spain, Western countries such as Britain, France and Germany were eager to offer arms and equipment, as well as volunteers, to assist the Finns. The war had a relatively short duration because of the disparity in armed might although the Soviet casualties were much greater than the Finns'. An armistice was signed in March 1940 in which Finland lost about 10% of its territory to the Soviets.

=== Return to Ethiopia ===
When Italy declared war on Britain, plans were laid to invade Ethiopia from Kenya and Sudan to topple the Italian regime and reinstate Hailie Selassie as emperor. Steer was appointed as an officer in the Intelligence Corps of the British Army, initially to chaperone Selassie from London to the Sudan under the pseudonym, "Mr Smith" since the emperor's position had to be kept secret from the Italians. Steer was then put in charge of a mobile propaganda unit to undermine the Italian garrisons by leafletting, loudspeaker attacks and so on. The campaign was remarkably successful, with many Italian troops deserting to become prisoners and many Ethiopians transferring allegiance.

Steer broadcast light Italian operas and news from the Italian front in Libya, where the British Army had great success against much larger Italian forces in 1941. The military campaign waged by British and Ethiopian soldiers was very successful and used a combination of regular troops and irregular forces, led by Orde Wingate. They entered the capital, Addis Ababa, in triumph in April 1941 to accept the defeat of the Italians.

Later, Steer was sent to India to lead a Field Propaganda Unit in Burma. The unit tried to break Japanese morale by loudspeakers with speeches and sentimental music. He was successively promoted from Lieutenant to Captain, Major and finally Lieutenant-colonel and was attached to the Special Operations Executive. His work was appreciated and promoted by General William Slim, the local army commander, who wanted to expand the operation.

== Personal life ==
In May 1936, while taking a break from rescue work, Steer married the French newspaper correspondent Margarita Herrero. Shortly afterward, he was deported by the Italian authorities, along with other Europeans, for aiding the Ethiopians. Margarita Steer died in childbirth in London on 29 January 1937 while her husband was reporting on the Spanish Civil War. In 1939 he married Esme Barton.

== Death ==
Steer died in Fagu, West Bengal (modern-day India) on 25 December 1944, in the crash of a heavily-loaded army Jeep, which he was driving. He was on the way to a Christmas party.

== Legacy ==
In 2006, Guernica honoured Steer by unveiling a bronze bust and naming a street in his memory, and in 2010, Bilbao dedicated George Steer Street, with his son and granddaughter attending the ceremony.

== Books by Steer ==
- Caesar in Abyssinia: An account of the Italo-Abyssinian war, 1935-6. With a map (1936).
- The Tree of Gernika: A field study of modern war. With plates and maps (1938).
- Germany in Africa. A series of articles dealing with the question of the former German African Colonies (1938).
- A Date in the Desert (1939).
- Judgment on German Africa (1939).
- Abyssinia to-day with W. Arnold-Forster (1939).
- Sealed and delivered : a book on the Abyssinian Campaign (1942).

== Books about Steer ==
- Nicholas Rankin – Telegram from Guernica: The Extraordinary Life of George Steer, War Correspondent ISBN 0-571-20563-1, 2003, Faber and Faber
