= Joë Bousquet =

French poet (1897–1950)

Joë Bousquet

Joë Bousquet (French: [buskɛ]; 19 March 1897 – 28 September 1950) was a French poet.

Bousquet was born in Narbonne. Wounded on 27 May 1918 at Vailly near the Aisne battlelines at the end of the First World War, he was paralysed for the rest of his life, and lived a life largely bedridden, surrounded by his books. His physical incapacity and constant pain (for which he took opium) caused a retreat from the world, but also became the starting point for an extensive body of poetry and writing. He contributed poetry to the Carcassonne poetic review Cahiers du Sud, and carried on a correspondence with many writers and friends, including Louis Aragon, André Gide, Paul Éluard, Max Ernst, and Simone Weil.

He died in Carcassonne, and his home there is now a museum in his memory, known as the Maison des mémoires.

Bousquet became friends with the surrealists, and his poetry is often associated with them. He also purchased paintings by Salvador Dalí, Max Ernst, Jean Fautrier, Wols, André Masson and Hans Bellmer, and was modeled by René Iché and painted by Jean Dubuffet.

His work was admired by many famous French writers of the 20th century, including René Char, Louis Aragon, André Breton, Maurice Blanchot, André Gide, Paul Valéry, and, most notably, Gilles Deleuze.

== Poetry ==
- Le Mal d'enfance, (Denoël, 1939), illustrated by René Iché
- Traduit du silence, (Gallimard, 1941)
- Le Meneur de lune, (1946)
- La Connaissance du soir, (Éditions du Raisin, 1946)
