= Ufa Ton-Woche 471/38/1939 =

German newsreel of the invasion of Poland

Ufa Ton-Woche 471/38/1939 is a German newsreel released on September 14, 1939. Aired just two weeks after the German attack on Poland, it presents a heavily propagandistic account of the campaign. The newsreel features Hermann Göring addressing Berlin factory workers, urging loyalty to Hitler. The retreating Polish forces are depicted as leaving behind scorched earth, while the so-called "Bloody Sunday of Bromberg" is framed as justification for severe reprisals. Antisemitic propaganda portrays Polish Jews as profiteers and criminals inciting violence against Germans, with claims that their relatives in England and France are pushing for war. The newsreel also shows Polish prisoners in camps and Adolf Hitler visiting his troops, reinforcing the narrative that Poles were deceived into fighting for British interests.

Some shots from Ufa Ton-Woche 471 were reused shortly after its release in Fritz Hippler’s Der Feldzug in Polen (The Campaign in Poland) in 1939 and in the antisemitic propaganda film Der ewige Jude (1940). Outside Germany, this footage was first repurposed as early as 1943 by Franciszka and Stefan Themerson in their experimental anti-Nazi short Calling Mr. Smith. After the war, Erwin Leiser incorporated the segment showing Poles from Bromberg being arrested and marched away for execution into his seminal documentary on National Socialism, Mein Kampf (1960), within a section addressing Partisans during the attack on Poland. Today, these images are regarded as some of the most widely recognized visual representations of the Holocaust.

== Screenshots ==
Screenshots of the iconic sequence about Bromberg

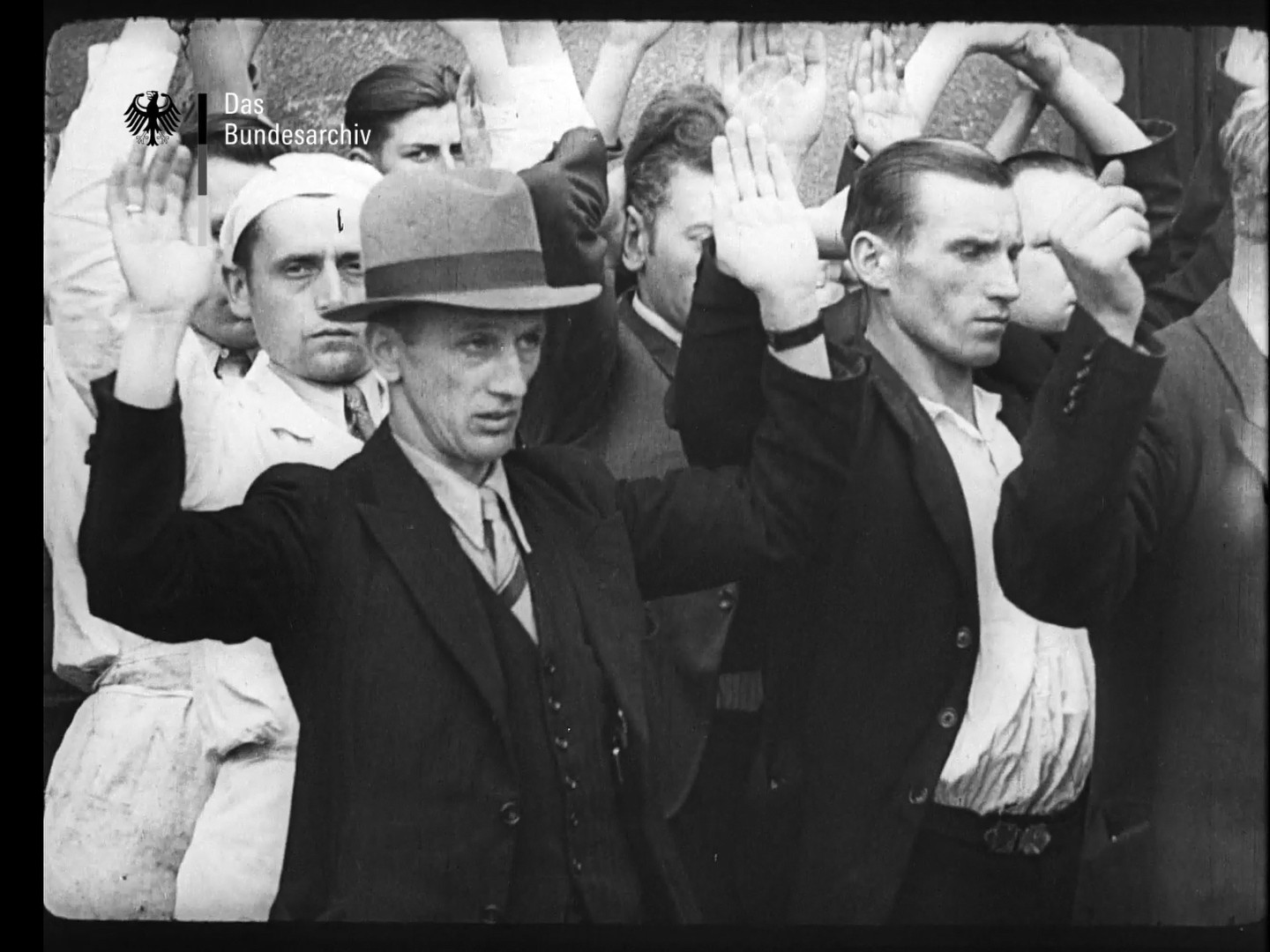
Ufa Ton-Woche 471/1939

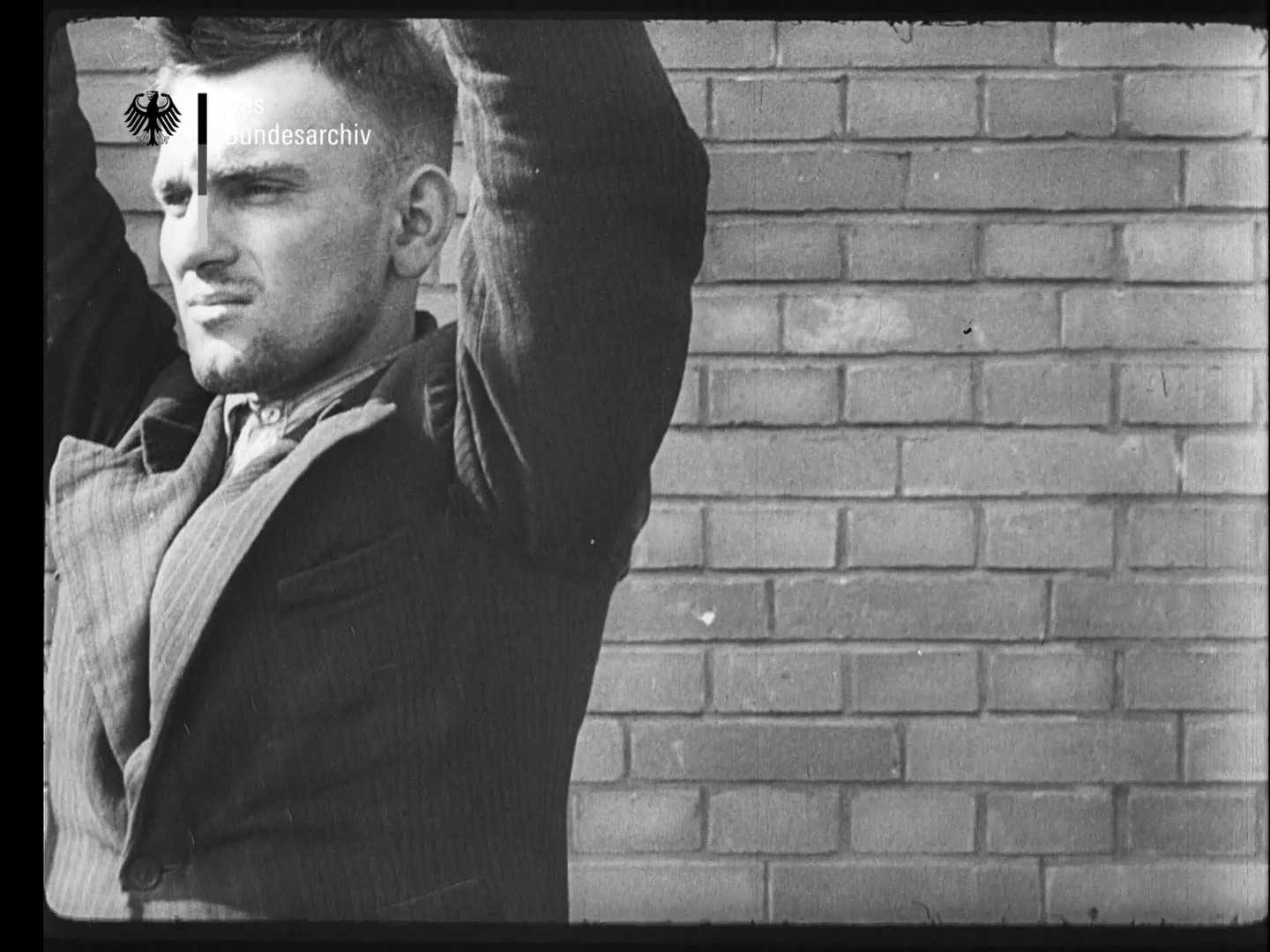
Ufa Ton-Woche 471/1939

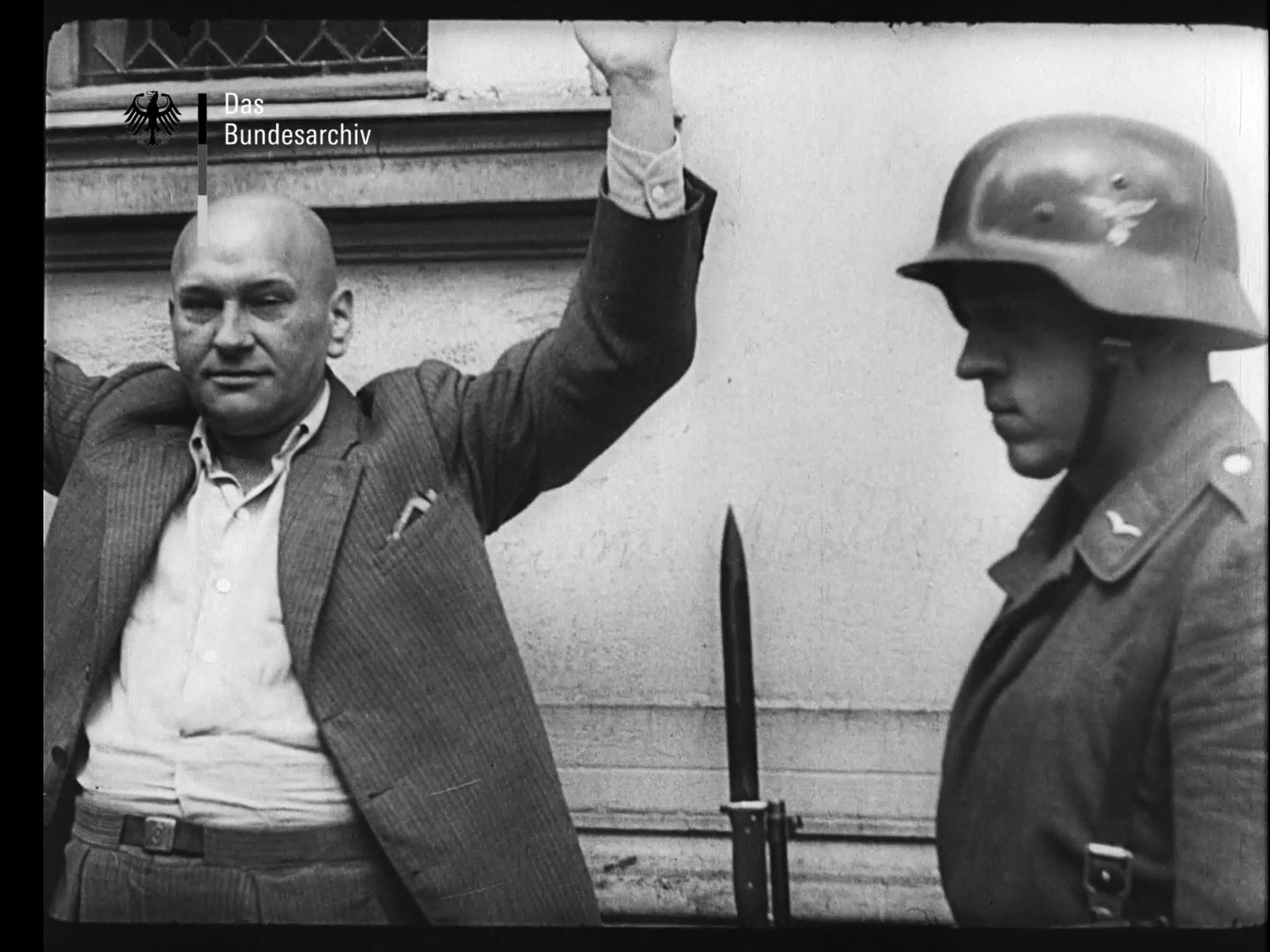
Ufa Ton-Woche 471/1939

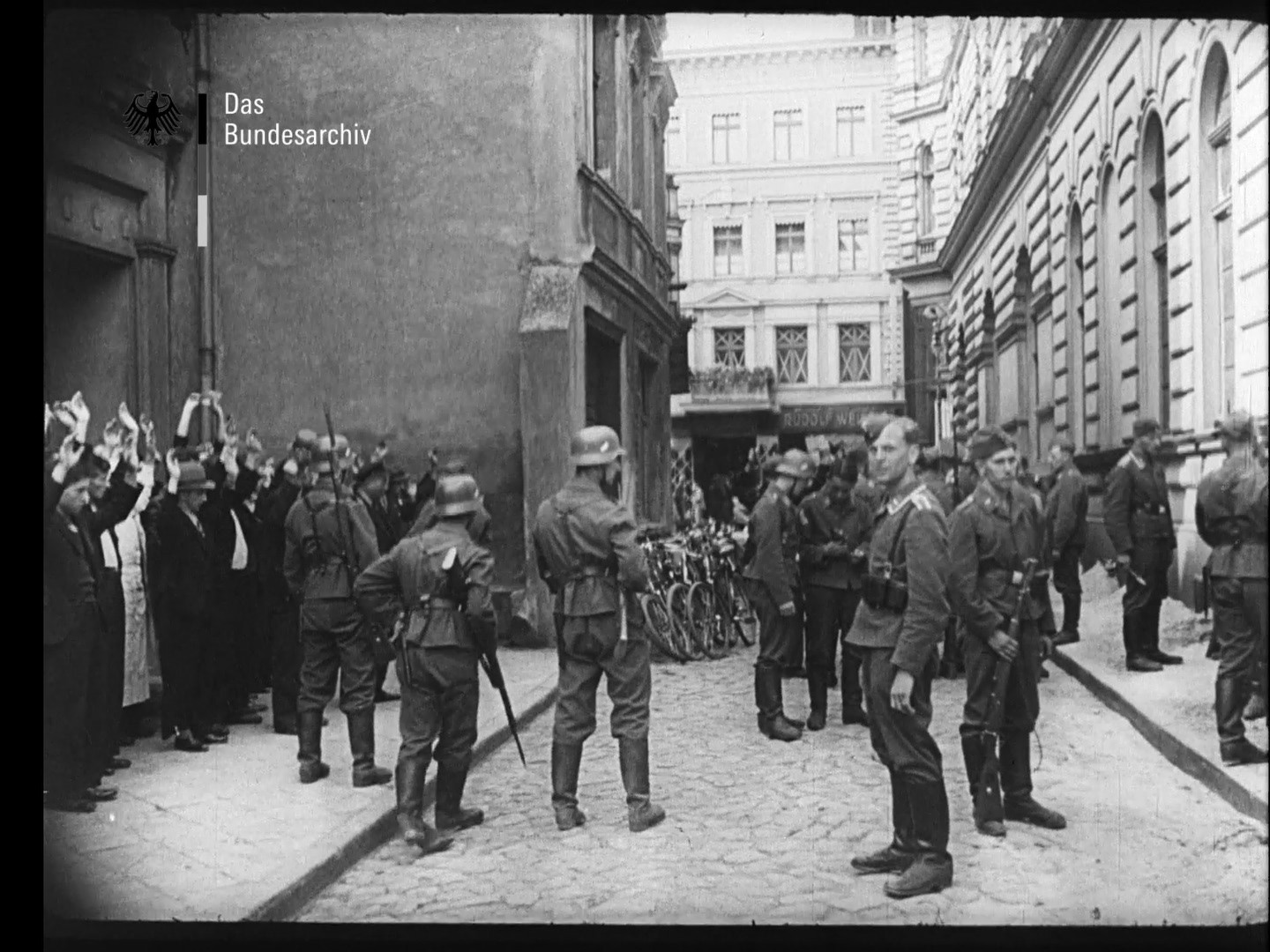
Ufa Ton-Woche 471/1939

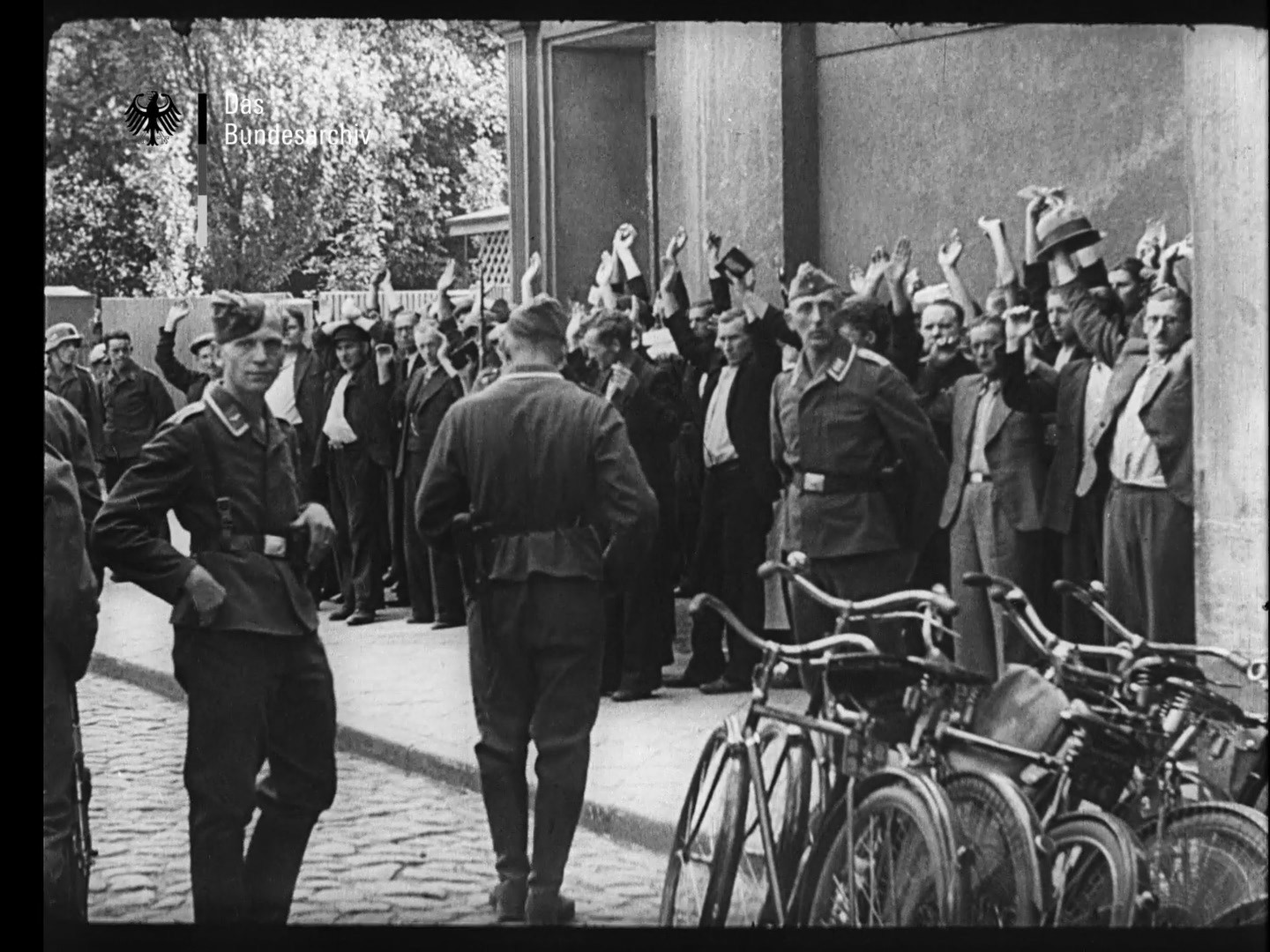
Ufa Ton-Woche 471/1939

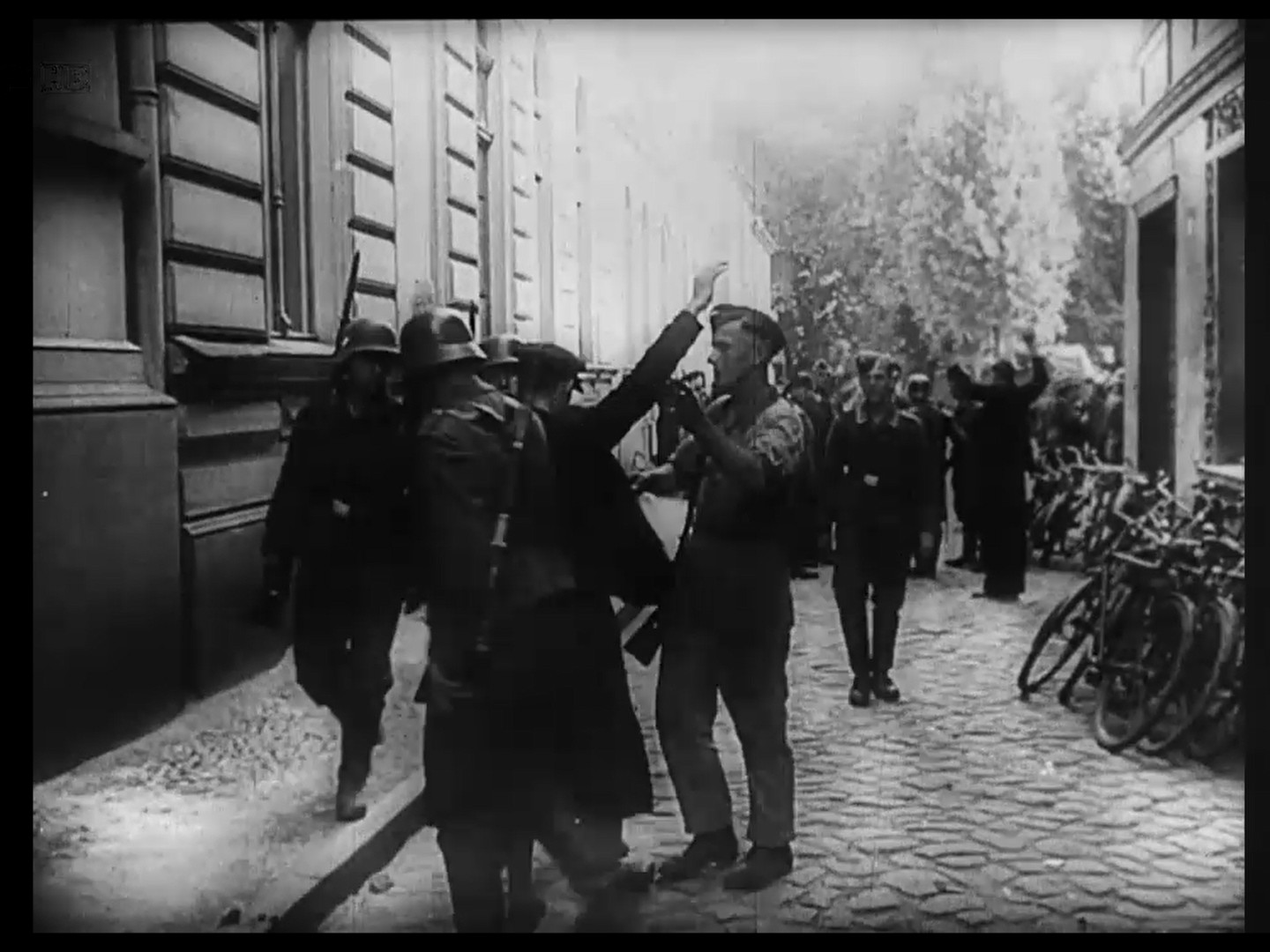
Ufa Ton-Woche 471/1939

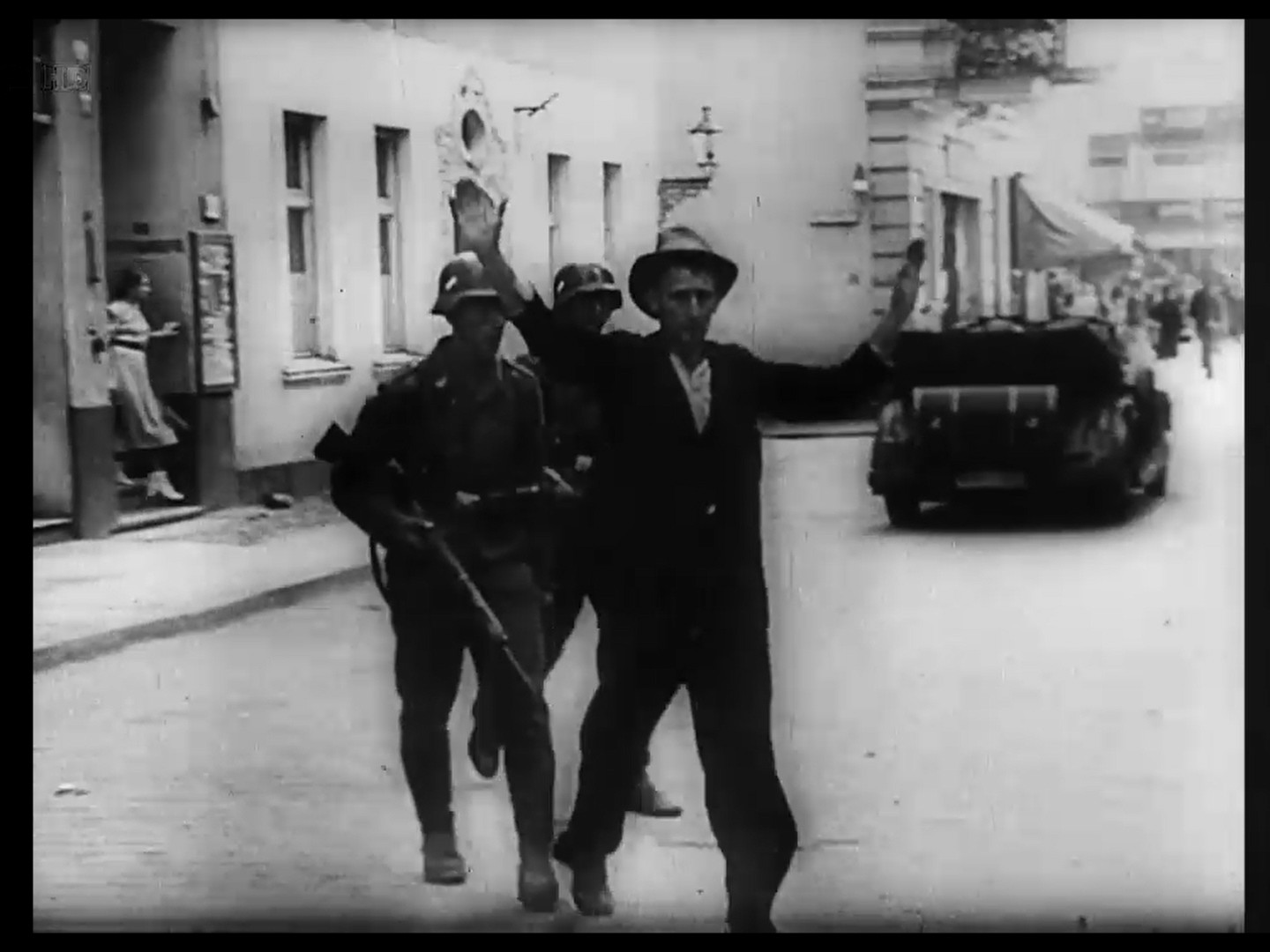
Ufa Ton-Woche 471/1939

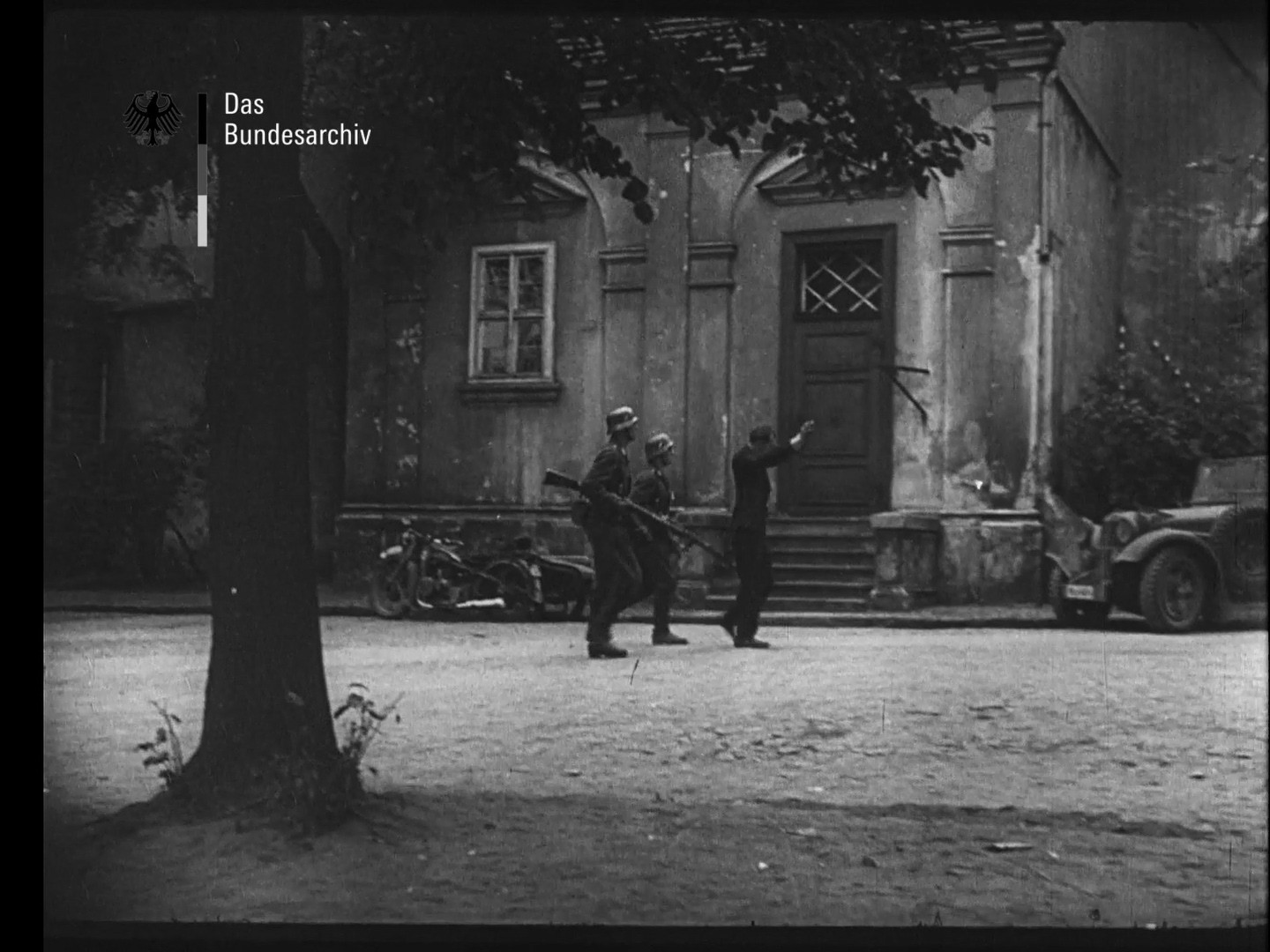
Ufa Ton-Woche 471/1939

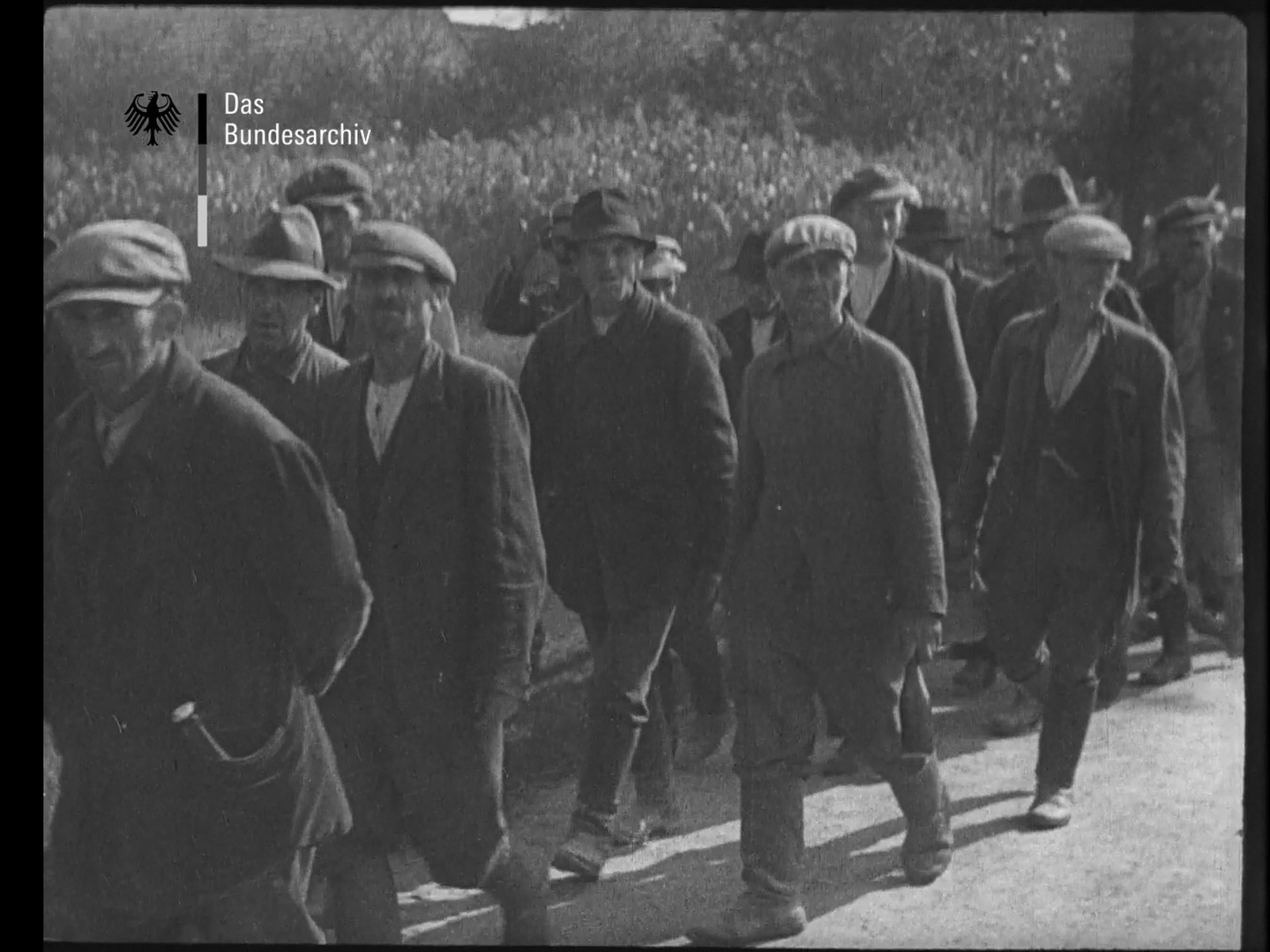
Ufa Ton-Woche 471/1939

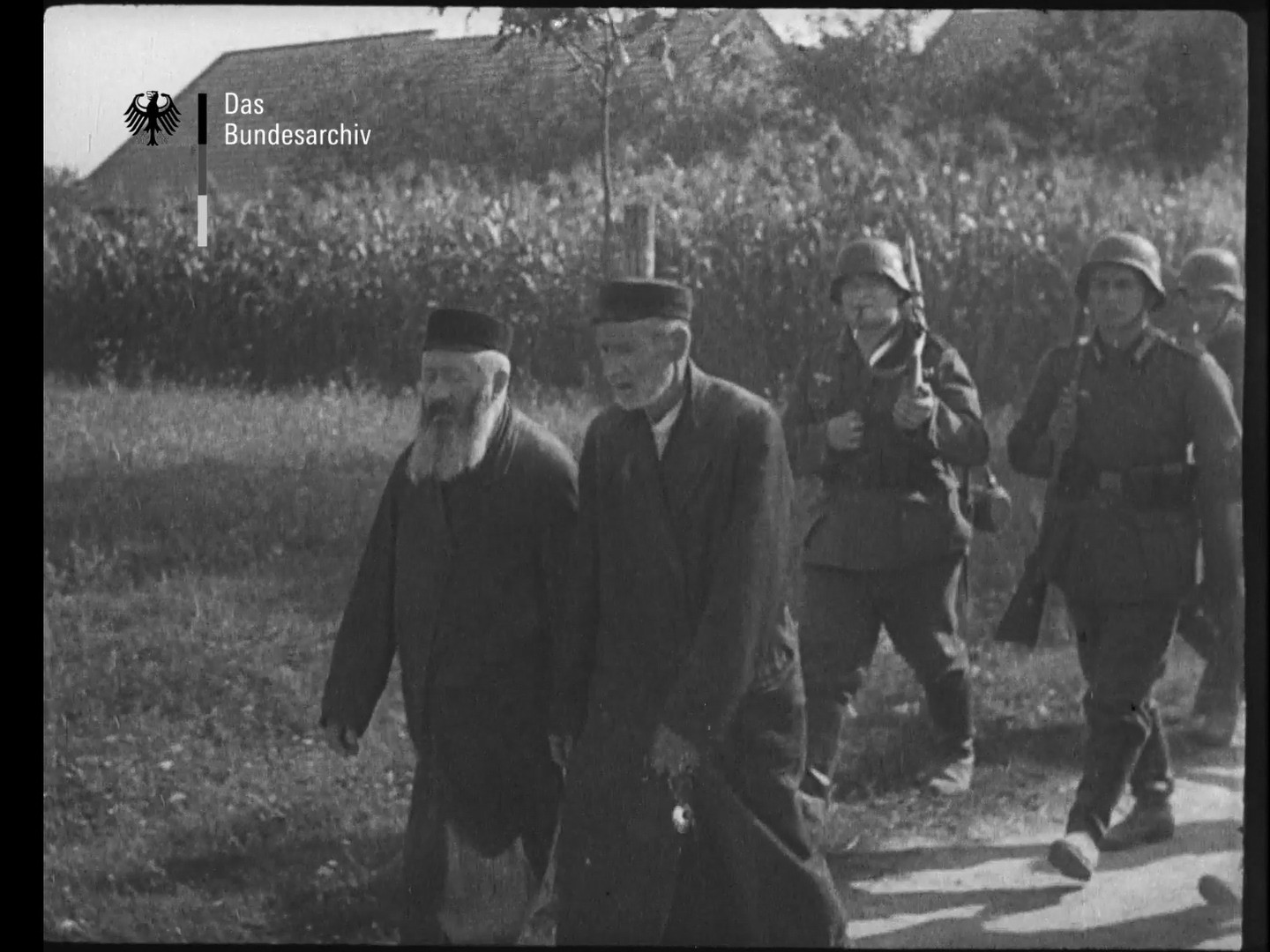
Ufa Ton-Woche 471/1939

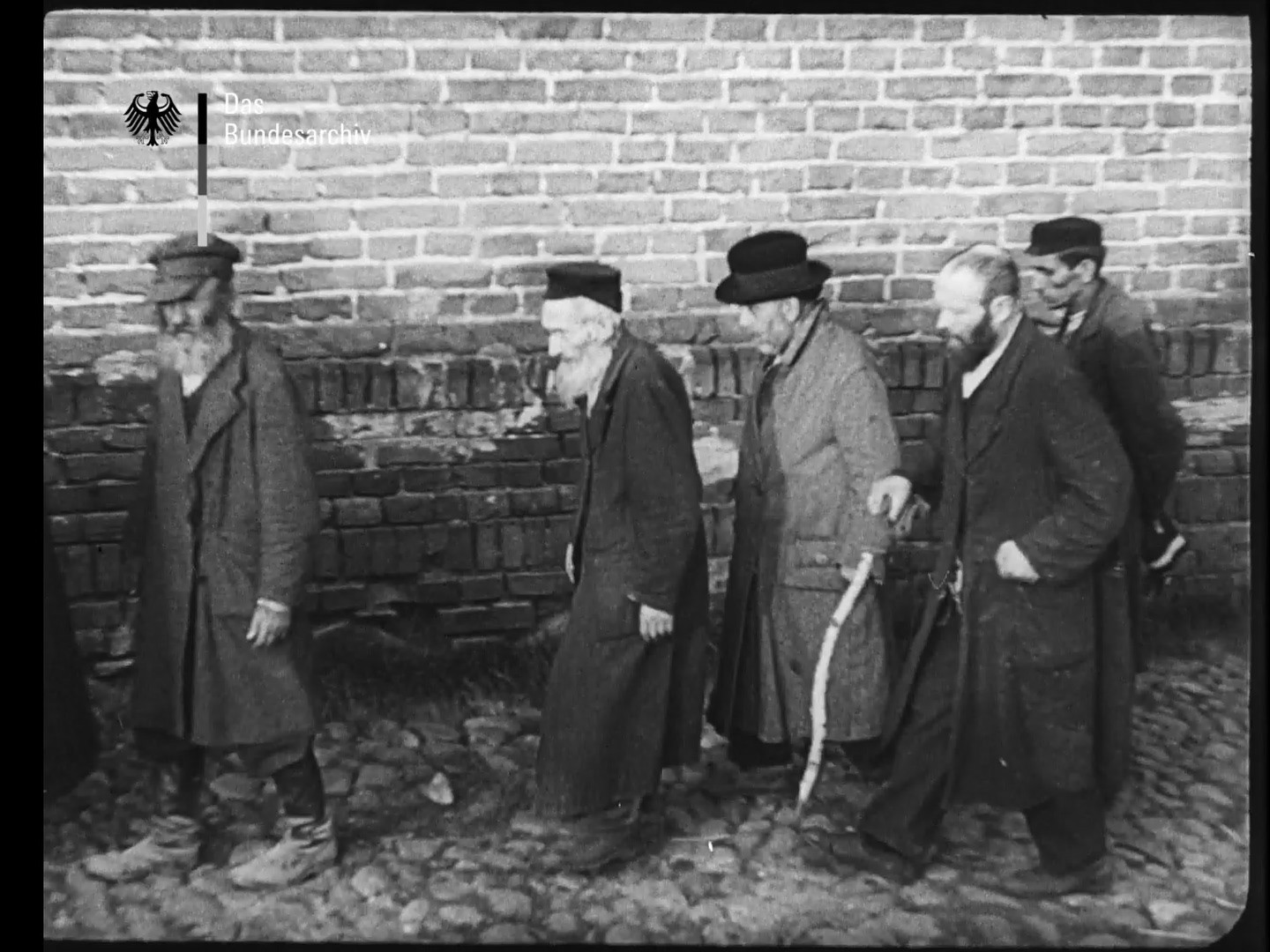
Ufa Ton-Woche 471/1939

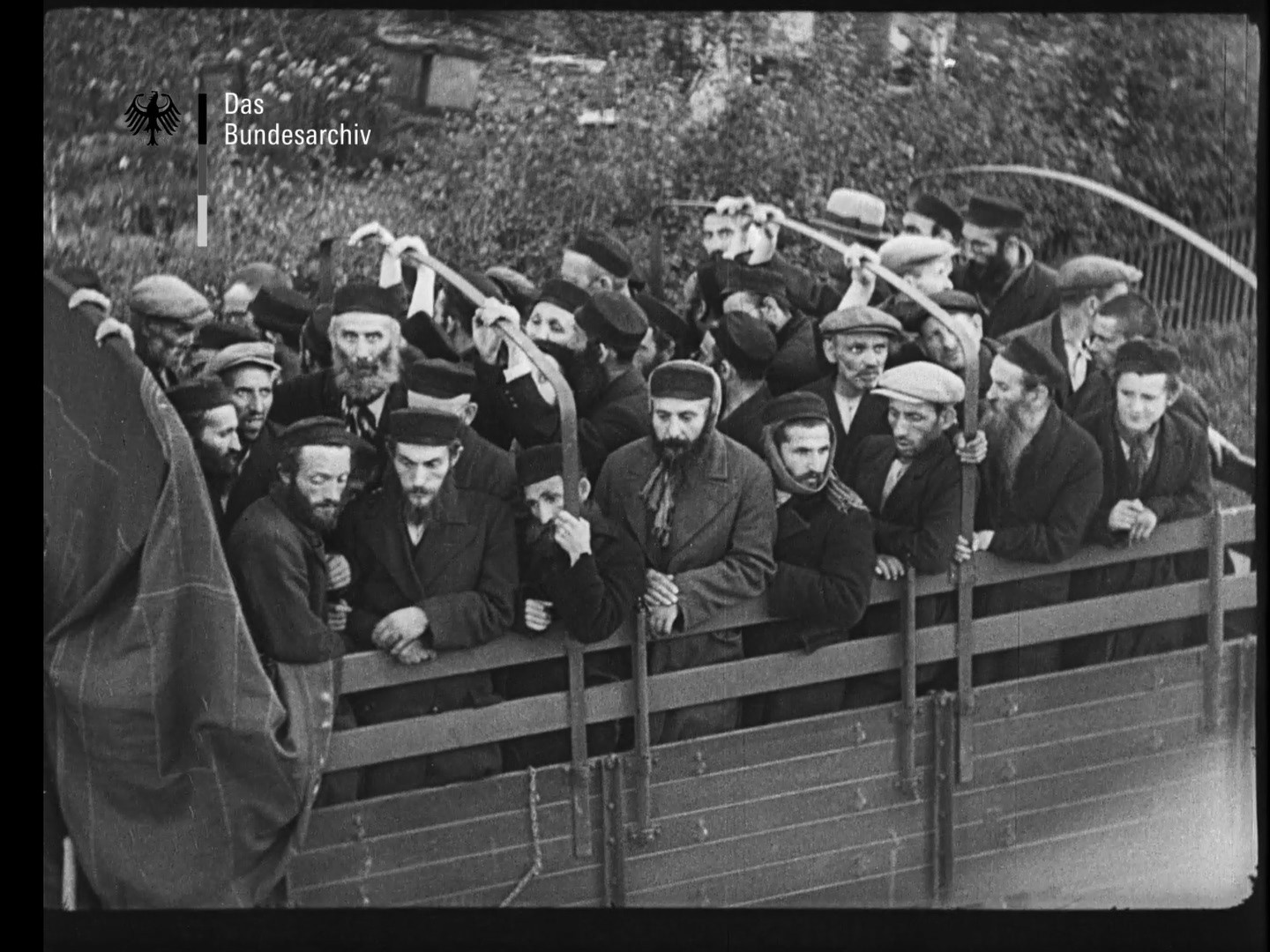
Ufa Ton-Woche 471/1939

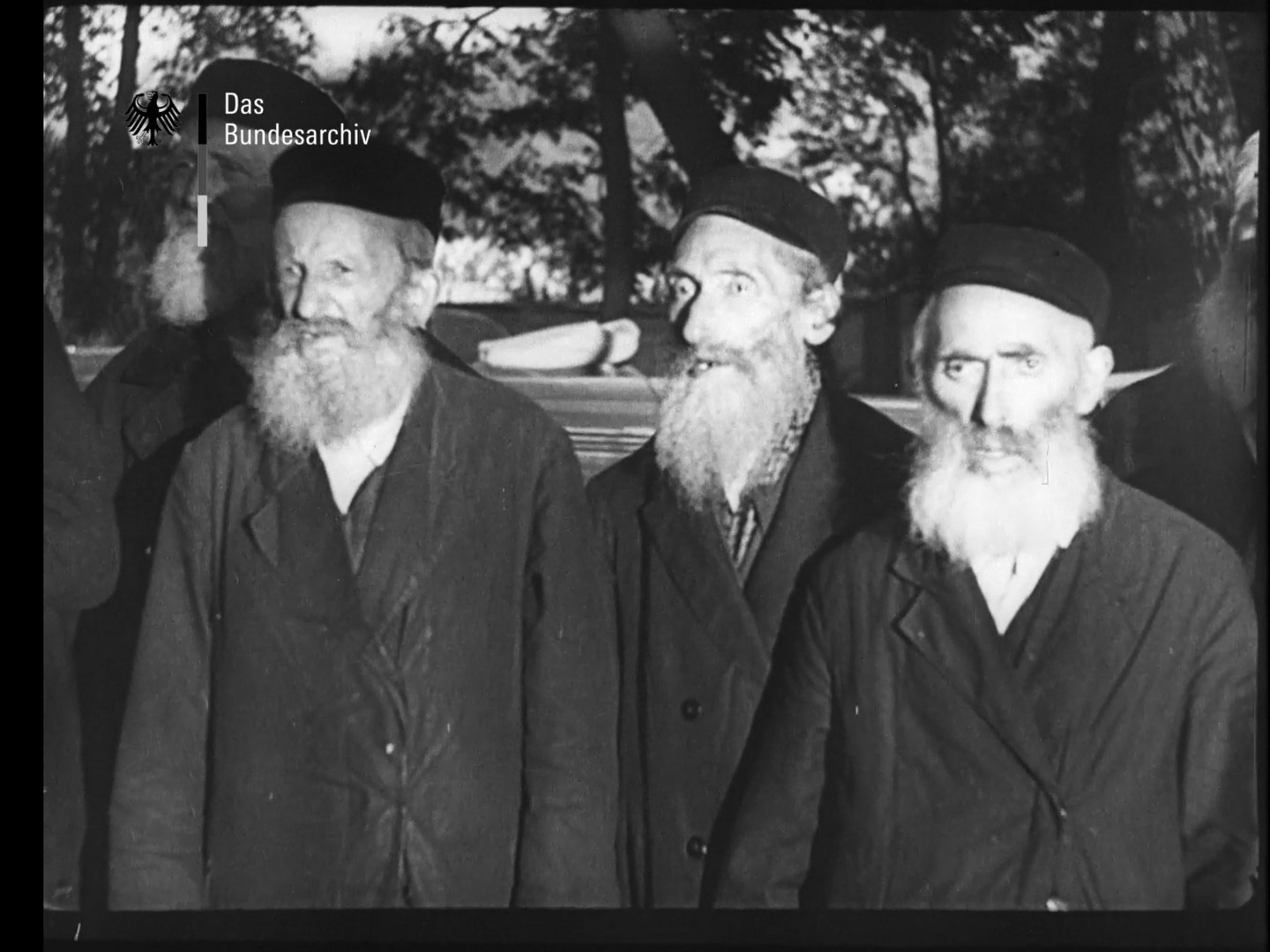
Ufa Ton-Woche 471/1939

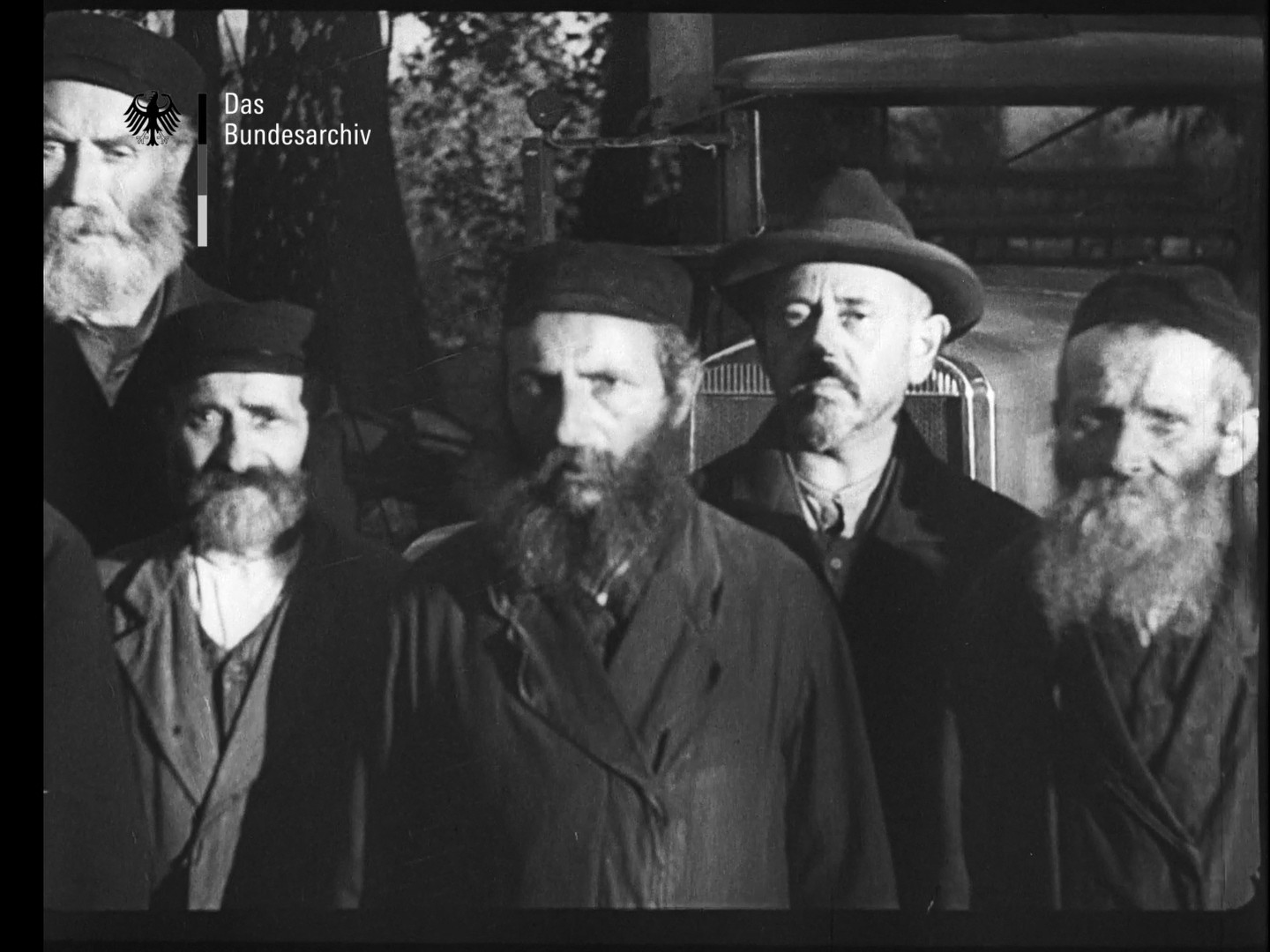
Ufa Ton-Woche 471/1939

== Popcultural references ==
Material from Ufa Ton-Woche 471/1939 appears in other films such as (selection): Der Feldzug in Polen (The Campaign in Poland) (1939), Der ewige Jude (1940), Mein Kampf (1960), The 81st Blow (1974), The Yellow Star: The Persecution of the Jews in Europe 1933–45 (1981), Genocide (1981), The Number on Great-Grandpa's Arm (2018), Shoah, les oubliés de l’histoire (2014), The U.S. and the Holocaust (2022).
