= Guernica (sculpture) =

Statue by René Iché

Guernica is a 1937 statue made by French sculptor René Iché.

== History ==
Guernica is one of Iché's most personal and violent works. He created this sculpture immediately after the bombing of Guernica on 26 April 1937, during the Spanish Civil War. Shocked by the horror of the civilians' massacre, Iché worked all day and the next night on his plaster statue. His daughter, Hélène, who was six at the time, was his model. However, Iché refused to exhibit his work because of its violence.

It was revealed to the general public in 1997, at the exhibition commemorating the centenary of the artist's birth. Thereafter, the sculpture was no longer exhibited and remains owned by the artist's family.

The original plaster was given in 2011 to the Musée Fabre, where it is going to be restored.

== See also ==
- Guernica, 1937 painting by Pablo Picasso
