= Régine Raufast =

Régine Raufast (died 1946) was a French Surrealist poet and writer, a member of the clandestine group La main à plume during the Nazi occupation of France.

== Life ==
Alongside the poet Laurence Iché and the Czech artist Tita, Raufast was active in La main à plume, writing a poem for its first collective publication.

She had a relationship with Raoul Ubac, and was the model for Ubac's 1939 photograph La Nébuleuse. Her subsequent relationship with Christian Dotremont lasted from April 1941 to March 1943. She was the inspiration for two long poems by Dotremont in 1942, Oleossoonne or the Speculative Moment and The Queen of the Walls.

Raufast committed suicide in 1946. Dotremont wrote a posthumous tribute to her in the Belgian surrealist journal Suractuel.

== Work ==
- 'Image et photographie', in La Conquête du Monde par l'Image, Paris: Éditions de la Main à Plume, 1942.
- 'Der Kubismus und die Gegenwart', in Wort und Tat, No. 2 (September 1946)
