= Bombing of Guernica =

Attack by military aircraft during the Spanish Civil War

Coordinates: 43°18′50″N 2°40′42″W

Operation Rügen
- Part of the Spanish Civil War
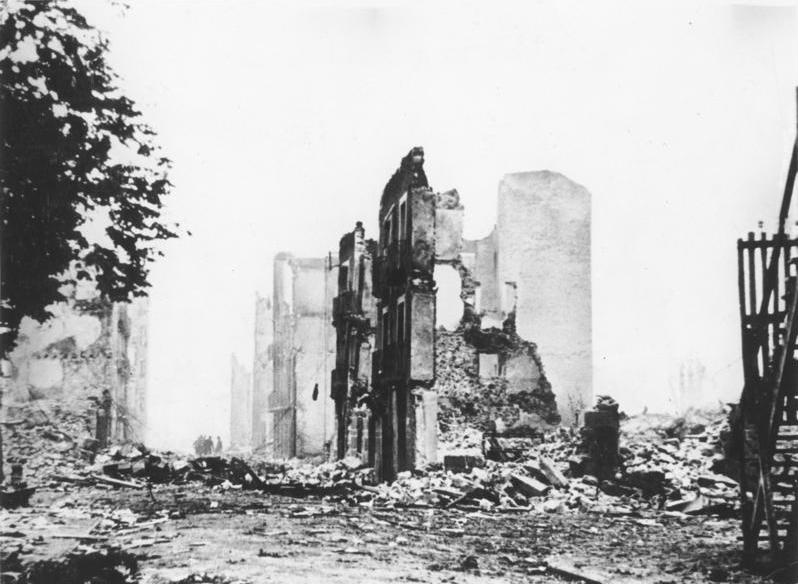
- Ruins of Guernica (1937)
- Type: Aerial bombing
- Location: Guernica, Basque Country, Spain
- Date: 26 April 1937; 89 years ago 16:30 – 19:30 (CET)
- Executed by: Nationalist Spain: (Nazi Germany) Condor Legion; (Kingdom of Italy) Legionary Air Force
- Casualties: ~150–1,654 (estimates vary) killed
- Location of Guernica within the Basque Autonomous Community Location of Guernica within Spain Location of Guernica within Europe

On 26 April 1937, the Basque town of Guernica (Gernika in Basque) was aerially bombed during the Spanish Civil War. It was carried out at the behest of Francisco Franco's rebel Nationalist faction by its allies, the Nazi German Luftwaffe's Condor Legion and the Fascist Italian Aviazione Legionaria, under the code name Operation Rügen. The town was being used as a communications centre by Republican forces just behind the front line, and the raid was intended to destroy bridges and roads. The operation opened the way to Franco's capture of Bilbao and his victory in northern Spain.

The attack gained controversy because it involved the bombing of civilians by a military air force. Seen as a war crime by some historians and argued as a legitimate attack by others, it was one of the first aerial bombings to capture global attention. Under the international laws regarding aerial warfare in 1937, Guernica was a legitimate military target. The number of victims is still disputed; the Basque government reported 1,654 people killed at the time, while local historians identified 126 victims (later revised by the authors of the study to 153). A British source used by the USAF Air War College claims 400 civilians died. Soviet archives claim 800 deaths on 1 May 1937, but this number may not include victims who later died of their injuries in hospitals or whose bodies were discovered buried in the rubble.

Some historians claim the devastation of the bombing was not as severe as the images make it seem. Rather they claim that Red forces destroyed aspects of the town as a far fetched propaganda attempt to show the brutality of the nationalist forces.

The bombing is the subject of the anti-war painting Guernica by Pablo Picasso, which was commissioned by the Spanish Republic. It was also depicted in a woodcut by the German artist Heinz Kiwitz, who was later killed fighting in the International Brigades, and by René Magritte in the painting Le Drapeau Noir. The bombing shocked and inspired many other artists, including a sculpture by René Iché, one of the first electroacoustic music pieces by Patrick Ascione, musical compositions by Octavio Vazquez (Gernika Piano Trio), René-Louis Baron and Mike Batt (performed by Katie Melua), and poems by Paul Eluard (Victory of Guernica), and Uys Krige (Afrikaans: Nag van die Fascistiese Bomwerpers, lit. 'Night of the Fascist Bombers'). There is also a short film from 1950 by Alain Resnais titled Guernica.

== Background ==
Guernica (Gernika in Basque; officially Gernika-Lumo), in the Basque province of Biscay, and 30 kilometres east of Bilbao, has long been a centre of great significance to the Basque people. Its Gernikako Arbola ("the tree of Gernika" in Basque) is an oak tree that symbolises traditional freedoms for the Biscayan people and, by extension, for the Basque people as a whole. Guernica was considered a key part of the Basques' national identity; it was long celebrated as "the home of Basque liberties". At the time of the bombing, the population of Guernica was 7,000 people, and the battlefront was 30 kilometres away.

=== Military situation ===
1937 advance of Nationalist troops in Northern Spain

Advances by Nationalist troops led by Generalísimo Francisco Franco had eaten into the territory controlled by the Republican government. The Basque government, an autonomous regional administrative body formed by Basque nationalists, sought to defend Biscay and parts of Gipuzkoa with its own light Basque Army. At the time of the raid, Guernica represented a focal strategic point for the Republican forces. It stood between the Nationalists and capture of Bilbao. Bilbao was seen as key to bringing the war to a conclusion in the north of Spain. Guernica also was the path of retreat for the Republicans from the northeast of Biscay.

Prior to the Condor Legion raid, the town had not been directly involved in the fighting, although Republican forces were in the area; 23 battalions of Basque army troops were at the front east of Guernica. The town also housed two Basque army battalions, although it had no static air defenses, and it was thought that no air cover could be expected due to recent losses of the Republican Air Force. (Note: Although on 27 April, two Republican fighters were reported shot down by Condor Legion Messerschmitt Bf 109 conducting follow-up raids against traffic around Guernica.)

=== Market day ===
Monday 26 April was market day; there were more than 10,000 people in the former Basque capital. Generally speaking, a market day would have attracted people from the surrounding areas to Guernica to conduct business. Market days consisted of local farmers bringing in their crops to sell to the village people. They would bring the crops of the week's labour to the main square, which is where the market was held.

There is a historical debate over whether a market was being held that particular Monday as, prior to the bombing, the Basque government had ordered a general halt to markets to prevent congestion of roads, and restricted large meetings. It is accepted by most historians that Monday "...would have been a market day."

== Luftwaffe doctrine, 1933–1942 ==
James Corum states that a prevalent view about the Luftwaffe and its Blitzkrieg operations was that it had a doctrine of terror bombing, in which civilians were deliberately targeted in order to break the will or aid the collapse of an enemy. After the bombing of Guernica in 1937, Wieluń and Warsaw in 1939, and Rotterdam in 1940, it was commonly assumed that terror bombing was a part of Luftwaffe doctrine. During the interwar period the Luftwaffe leadership officially rejected the concept of terror bombing, but continued to allow bombings which might result in heavy civilian casualties:

The vital industries and transportation centres that would be targeted for shutdown were valid military targets. It could be claimed civilians were not to be targeted directly, but the breakdown of production would affect their morale and will to fight. German legal scholars of the 1930s carefully worked out guidelines for what type of bombing was permissible under international law. While direct attacks against civilians were ruled out as "terror bombing", the concept of attacking vital war industries-and probable heavy civilian casualties and breakdown of civilian morale-was ruled as acceptable.

General Walther Wever compiled a doctrine known as The Conduct of the Aerial War in 1935. In this document, which the Luftwaffe adopted, the Luftwaffe rejected Giulio Douhet's theory of terror bombing. Terror bombing was deemed to be "counter-productive", increasing rather than destroying the enemy's will to resist. Such bombing campaigns were regarded as a diversion from the Luftwaffe's main operations, destruction of the enemy armed forces.

== The raid ==
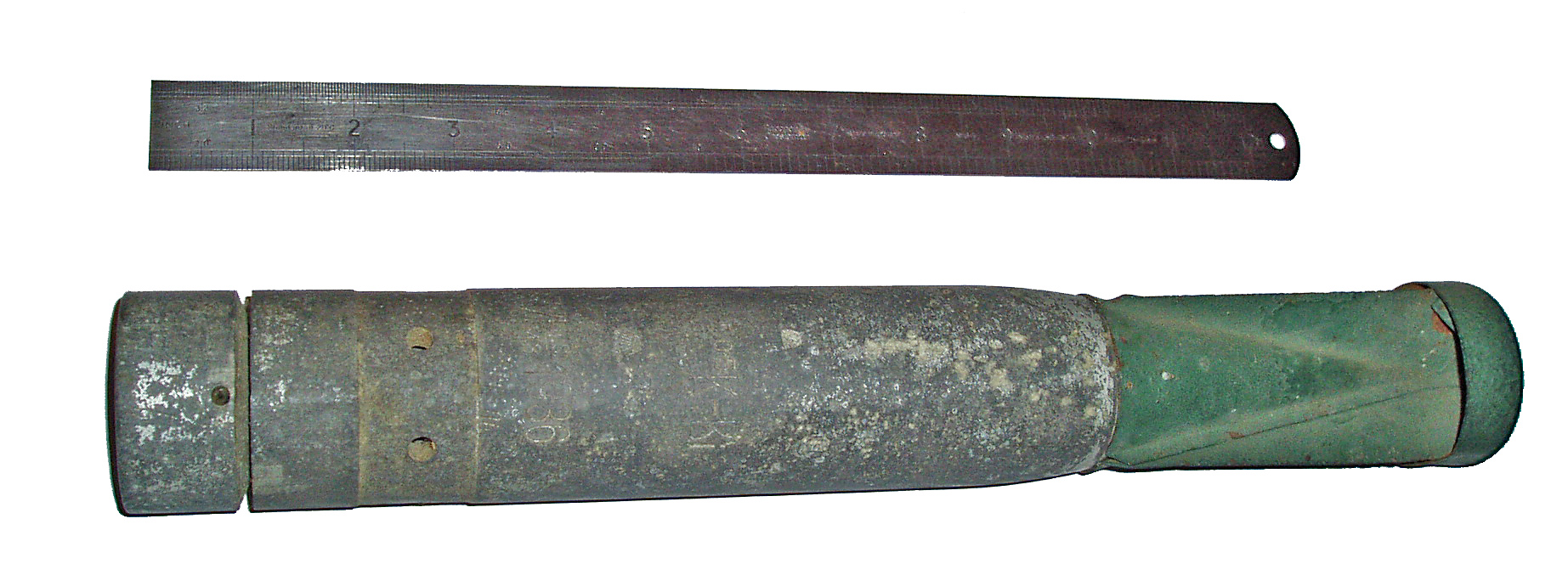
A Luftwaffe 1 kg incendiary bomb dated 1936

The Condor Legion was entirely under the command of the Nationalist forces. The order to perform the raid was transmitted to the commanding officer of the Condor Legion, Oberstleutnant Wolfram von Richthofen, from the Spanish Nationalist Command.

=== Mission planning ===
While questions are often raised over the intent of the raid, the diaries of the planner and commander of the mission made public in the 1970s indicate that an attack on Guernica was part of a wider Nationalist offensive in the area. It was intended to support the attack by 25 Nationalist battalions already in place. According to Payne:

Guernica was selected as a target by Lieutenant Colonel Wolfram von Richthofen (younger cousin of the “Red Baron” of World War I), chief of staff of the Condor Legion, for several reasons. It housed several battalions of troops and three arms factories, lay near the front lines, and was connected by means of an adjacent bridge to the road flanking the main Basque defensive position, along which the defenders might have to retreat. Richthofen’s chief goal was to block a main junction near the front to stymie Basque troop movements and permit Mola to break through, encircling the forces farther north... Pinpoint bombing was impossible with the existing technology, and the only way to hit the targets was to carpet much of the area.

Richthofen, understanding the strategic importance of the town in the advance on Bilbao and restricting Republican retreat, ordered an attack against the roads and bridge in the Renteria suburb. Destruction of the bridge was considered the primary objective since the raid was to operate in conjunction with Nationalist troop movements against Republicans around Marquina. Secondary objectives were restriction of Republican traffic/equipment movements and the prevention of bridge repair via the creation of rubble around the bridge.

=== Previous Nationalist moves ===
On 22 March 1937, Franco started to put this plan into action, assisted by his air chief, General Alfredo Kindelán. General Emilio Mola would start the campaign against the north (Asturias, Santander and Biscay). All Nationalist equipment was sent to the north front to support Mola. The main reason to attack first in the north was the belief that a decisive victory could be won there quickly. Mola wanted to make this fight quick; he let the Basque people know that if they wanted to surrender he would spare their lives and homes. On 31 March Mola's threat was put into action and the fighting began in Durango.

The Condor Legion persuaded Franco to send troops to go north and to be led by General Emilio Mola. On 31 March 1937, Mola attacked the province of Biscay, which included the bombing of Durango by the Condor Legion. Republicans put up a tough fight against the German troops but eventually were forced back. Many refugees fled to Guernica for safety, about a thousand people turned to Guernica. On 25 April, Mola sent a warning to Franco saying that he was planning a heavy strike against Guernica.

To meet these objectives, two Heinkel He 111s, one Dornier Do 17, eighteen Ju 52 Behelfsbomber, and three Italian Savoia-Marchetti SM.79 of the Corpo Truppe Volontarie were assigned for the mission. These were armed with 250 kg (550 lb) medium high-explosive bombs, 50 kg (110 lb) light explosive bombs and 1 kg (2.2 lb) incendiaries. (Note: Richthofen supposedly did have Ju 87 A1 (Stuka) at his disposal as these aircraft, as some sources indicate that first pre-serial Ju 87A came to Spain in November 1936, serving in the experimental VJ/88 unit. Regular deliveries began arriving in Spain in December 1937, although this is disputed.) The ordnance load for the 24 bombers was 22 tonnes (22 long tons; 24 short tons) in total. A follow-up to the bombing raid was also planned for the next day involving Messerschmitt Bf 109 raids in the area. The order was noted on 26 April by Richthofen as:

Starting at once: A/88 and J/88 for free fighter bomber mission on the streets near Marquina-Guernica-Guerriciaz. K/88 (after Returning from Guerriciaz), VB/88 and Italians for the streets and the bridge (including suburb) east of Guernica. There we have to close the traffic, if we finally want a decision against personnel and materiel of the enemy. Vigon agrees to move his troops for blocking all streets south of Guernica. If this succeeds, we will have trapped the enemy around Marquina.

=== First five waves of raid ===
The first wave arrived over Guernica around 16:30. A Dornier Do 17, coming from the south, dropped approximately twelve 50 kg (110 lb) bombs.

The three Italian SM.79s had taken off from Soria at 15:30 with orders to "bomb the road and bridge to the east of Guernica, in order to block the enemy retreat" during the second wave. Their orders explicitly stated not to bomb the town itself. During a single 60-second pass over the town, from north to south, the SM.79s dropped thirty-six 50 kg (110 lb) light explosive bombs. César Vidal says that at this point, the damage to the town was "relatively limited... confined to a few buildings", including the church of San Juan and headquarters of the Izquierda Republicana ("Republican Left") political party.

The next three waves of the first attack then occurred, ending around 18:00. The third wave consisted of a Heinkel He 111 escorted by five Regia Aeronautica Fiat CR.32 fighters led by Capitano Corrado Ricci. The fourth and fifth waves were carried out by German twin-engined planes. Vidal notes:

If the aerial attacks had stopped at that moment, for a town that until then had maintained its distance from the convulsions of war, it would have been a totally disproportionate and insufferable punishment. However, the biggest operation was yet to come.

=== Subsequent raids ===
Earlier, around noon that day, the Junkers Ju 52s of the Condor Legion had carried out a mission around Gerrikaraiz. Following this they landed to re-arm and then took off to complete the raid on Guernica. The attack would run from north to south, coming from the Bay of Biscay and up the course of the Urdaibai estuary.

The 1st and 2nd Squadrons of the Condor Legion took off at about 16:30, with the 3rd Squadron taking off from Burgos a few minutes later. They were escorted from Vitoria-Gasteiz by a squadron of Fiat fighters and Messerschmitt Bf 109Bs of Günther Lützow's 2. Staffel (2nd Squadron) of Jagdgruppe 88 (J/88), for a total of twenty-nine planes. Lützow himself did not participate in the attack, he was on home leave from 8–29 April 1937.

=== Outcome ===
The bombing shattered the city's defenders' will to resist, allowing the rebel Nationalists to overrun it. This indirectly supported Douhet's theory, which predicted this result. The rebels faced little resistance and took complete control of the town by 29 April. The attacks destroyed most of Guernica. Three-quarters of the city's buildings were reported completely destroyed, and most others sustained damage. Among infrastructure spared were the arms factories Unceta and Company and Talleres de Guernica along with the Assembly House Casa de Juntas and the Gernikako Arbola. Since the Luftwaffe was then operating on Wever's theory of bombing as a military action, the mission was considered a failure as a result. However, the rubble and civil disorder that the raid created severely restricted the movement of Republican forces.

== Casualties ==
The number of civilian fatalities is now set at between 170 and 300 people. Until the 1980s, it had been generally accepted that the number of deaths had been over 1,700, but these numbers are now known to have been exaggerated. Historians now agree that the number of deaths was under 300.

An early study by Gernikazarra Historia Taldea estimated the number of victims to be 126, later revised to 153, and is still considered by the organisation to be provisional. Those incomplete data roughly correspond to the mortuary records of the town that survived, and do not include the 592 deaths registered in Bilbao's hospital. Raúl Arias Ramos in his book La Legión Cóndor en la Guerra Civil states that there were 250 dead. The study by Joan Villarroya and Josep M. Solé i Sabaté in their book España en Llamas: la Guerra Civil desde el Aire states that there were 300 dead. These studies, cited by historians such as Stanley Payne and Antony Beevor, as well as media such as the BBC and El Mundo, provide the currently recognized death toll in those numbers.

After Nationalist forces led by General Emilio Mola's forces took the town three days later, the Nationalist side claimed that no effort to establish an accurate number had been made by the opposite side. The Basque government, in the confused aftermath of the raids, reported 1,654 dead and 889 wounded. Such a number roughly agreed with the testimony of British journalist George Steer, correspondent of The Times, which estimated that 800 to 3,000 of 5,000 people perished in Guernica. These figures were adopted over the years by some commentators. These figures are represented in a majority of the literature from that period and up to the 1970s.

The Nationalist junta gave a patently false description of the events, claiming that the destruction had been caused by Republicans burning the town as they fled, and seemed to have made no effort to establish an accurate number. At an extreme low, the Francoist newspaper Arriba claimed, on 30 January 1970, that there had only been twelve deaths.

=== Bombs to casualty ratio ===
Issues with the originally released figures were raised following an appraisal of large scale bombing raids during the Second World War. A comparison of the Guernica figures with the figures of dead resulting from air attacks on major European cities during the Second World War exposed an anomaly. James Corum uses the figure of forty tons of bombs dropped on Guernica, and calculates that if the figure of 1654 dead is accepted as accurate, then the raid caused 41 fatalities per ton of bombs. By way of comparison, the Dresden air raid during February 1945, which saw 3,431 tons of bombs dropped on the city, caused fewer deaths per ton of bombs: 7.2–10.2 fatalities per ton of bombs dropped. Corum, who ascribes the discrepancy between the high death toll reported at Guernica and in other cases such as Rotterdam to propaganda, goes on to say that for Guernica:

...a realistic estimate on the high side of bombing effectiveness (7–12 fatalities per ton of bombs) would yield a figure of perhaps 300–400 fatalities in Guernica. This is certainly a bloody enough event, but reporting that a small town was bombed with a few hundred killed would not have had the same effect as reporting that a city was bombed with almost 1,700 dead".

== Media reporting ==
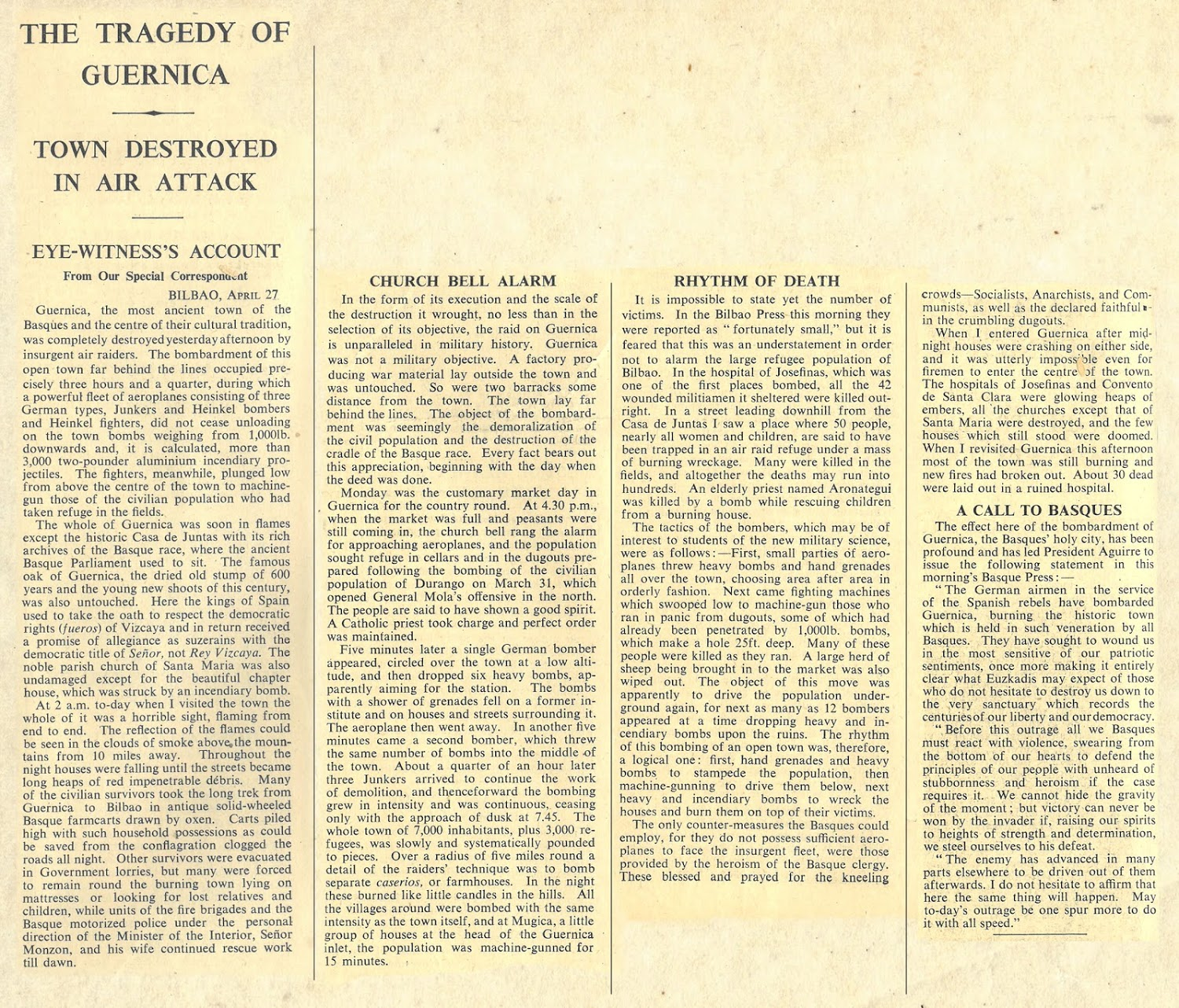
George Steer's report in The Times

=== English-language media ===
The first English-language media reports of the destruction in Guernica appeared two days later. George Steer, a reporter for The Times, who was covering the Spanish Civil War from inside the country, authored the first full account of events. Steer's reporting set the tone for much of the subsequent reportage, with part of his report stating "Guernica was not a military objective... The object of the bombardment was seemingly the demoralisation of the civil population and the destruction of the cradle of the Basque race." Steer also pointed out German complicity in the action, citing three small bomb cases stamped with the German Imperial Eagle as evidence. Steer's report was syndicated to The New York Times and then worldwide, generating widespread shock, outrage, and fear. There was coverage in other national and international editions also:

- The Times ran the story every day for over a week after the attack.
- The New York Post ran a cartoon showing Adolf Hitler brandishing a bloody sword labelled "air raids" as he towered over heaps of civilian dead littering "the Holy City of Guernica".
- The US Congressional Record referred to poison gas having been dropped on Guernica. This did not actually occur.
- During debates in the British Parliament, Guernica was also inaccurately described as an "open city" which contained no military targets.

Noel Monks, an Australian correspondent in Spain for the London Daily Express, was the first reporter to arrive on the scene after the bombing. He received the following cable from his office, "Berlin denies Guernica bombing. Franco says he had no planes up yesterday owing fog. Queipo de Llano says Reds dynamited Guernica during retreat."

Overall, the impression generated was one which fed the widely held public fear of air attack which had been building throughout the 1930s, a fear which accurately anticipated that in the next war the aerial forces of warring nations would be able to wipe whole cities off the map.

Stanley Payne observes that the presence of Steer was the reason for Guernica becoming a major media event; the town of Durango had been bombed a few days before and suffered higher casualties yet received comparatively little attention. Steer was first on the scene and was eager to dramatise the effect of bombing on cities in order to encourage war preparedness. Steer inflated the number of casualties by 1000%.

=== Republican media reporting ===
After the attack, José Antonio Aguirre, president of the provisional Basque government, published the following press release:

"German airforces, following orders of the Spanish fascists, have bombed Guernica, setting the historical villa, that so much veneration has among the Basques, on fire. They wanted to hurt us in the most vulnerable spot of our patriotic sentiment, proving once again what Euzkadi may expect from those who won't hesitate in destroying the sanctuary that commemorates centuries of our freedom and democracy... Before God and before history, which will judge us all, I assure you that the German planes bombed the population of Guernica, with unprecedented viciousness, for three hours, reducing the historical villa to ashes. They haunted women and children with machine gun fire, killing large numbers of them..."

The official Republican casualty figure was 1,645 deaths and 889 wounded.

=== Denial by Franco's military board ===
On 27 April, the day after the bombing, Nationalist general Gonzalo Queipo de Llano broadcast a statement through Union Radio Seville accusing the local population and "the reds" of having deliberately burned and dynamited Guernica, while calling international reporters liars. Among the facts that he provided to prove his version of events were the "absolute absence of German airforces" and the bad weather. Some newspapers, issued in the Nationalist zone, claimed that the city was burnt by "ruso-separatistas'.

On 29 April, in view of the outrage caused by the bombing in European public opinion, Franco's propaganda service issued an official statement parroting Llano's claims. This theory found favor in conservative British journals, including The Times, which even put in doubt the testimony from its own correspondent, George Steer. While Republican forces had pursued a scorched earth strategy in the past (notably in Irun, which was dynamited), Steer's reporting was supported by other journalists who witnessed the same levels of destruction. Furthermore, there were objective proofs available at the time of the falsehood of Llano's version: the bad weather he mentioned happened hours after the attack had been perpetrated, and the city's weaponry as well as the bridge to get to it were among the few buildings which had not been destroyed.

The Germans denied any involvement, as well. Von Richthofen claimed that the Germans had a target that was a bridge over the Mundaka River, which was on the edge of town. It was chosen for the fact that it would cut off the fleeing Republican troops. However, even though the Germans had the best airmen and the best planes in Spain, none of their bombs hit the presumed target.

Some Nationalist reporters suggested that the town had been bombed from the air, but by Republican airplanes. The bombs were said to have been made in the Basque country and the explosions happened because of dynamite stored in the sewers. Another theory by Nationalists was that there were a "few bomb fragments found" in Guernica, but the damage was mainly caused by Basque incendiaries. Franco's regime minimized the bombing for decades. In 1970, newspaper Arriba claimed that there had only been twelve deaths during the bombing raid.

The attempted cover-up did more harm than good. The uproar irritated even Hitler, who insisted that Franco's government absolve the Condor Legion from any responsibility. Ironically, the whole affair may have redounded to his advantage, for it had the effect of heightening concern about the destructiveness of the Luftwaffe, a fear that encouraged appeasement of Germany. In the aftermath, Franco reiterated his earlier orders that no open town, without troops or military industry, may be bombed without a direct order from the Generalissimo or the commanding general of the air force.

== Views on the attack ==
The attack has entered the lexicon of war as an example of terror bombing. It is also remembered by the surviving inhabitants and Basque people as such. Due to the lingering divisions from the conflict, the event remains a source of emotion and public recrimination.

=== Military intentions ===
A commonly held viewpoint is that the involvement of the Luftwaffe in the Civil War occurred because of shared anti-communism and to form a proving ground for troops employed later during World War II. This view is supported by the comments of then Reichsmarschall Hermann Göring at the Nuremberg Trials:

I urged him (Adolf Hitler) to give support [to Franco] under all circumstances, firstly, in order to prevent the further spread of communism in that theater and, secondly, to test my young Luftwaffe at this opportunity in this or that technical respect.

One historian claimed the Germans bombed Guernica in a deliberate attempt to destroy the entire town.

According to James Corum, while the popular view of the attack was a terror bombing aimed at the town, in reality the intended target was the bridge and roads. The issue was that pinpoint bombing was not possible at the time of the attack. Most of the bombers used by the Luftwaffe in Spain did not possess adequate targeting gear and thus the Condor Legion's preferred solution was to carpet the area with bombs to ensure the targets would be hit. Corum also argues against the view that there was a psychological element to the attack, stating that Richtofen seemed unaware of the significance of Guernica to the Basques and his diary indicates he only cared that the attack had been able to shut down logistics in the town. The Nationalists also didn't destroy the Basque parliament building or the Holy Oak, both of which had great cultural significance to the Basque and would have been excellent targets if the raid was meant solely to be a psychological warfare attack. Corum also argues that the attack on the town did not differ in style from the types of attacks the Allies conducted during World War II, and the Condor Legion regarded the attack as a routine tactical operation.

==== Carpet bombing ====
Alongside the potential for gains in combat experience it is also thought that various strategic initiatives were first tried as part of Luftwaffe involvement in the conflict. Theories on strategic bombing were first developed by the Luftwaffe with the first exhibition of "carpet bombing" in the September 1937 Asturias campaign. Comparisons between the raid on Guernica and the fate of other cities during the conflict are also telling. As the fighting progressed into March 1938, Italian pilots flying as Aviazione Legionaria were involved in thirteen raids against Barcelona involving fire and gas bombs.

The use of "carpet bombing" was becoming standard practice by Condor Legion personnel. To illustrate this point, military historian James Corum cites an excerpt from a 1938 Condor Legion report on this use of this tactic:

We have had notable results in hitting the targets near the front, especially in bombing villages which hold enemy reserves and headquarters. We have had great success because these targets are easy to find and can be thoroughly destroyed by carpet bombing.

On the Spanish side, threats made prior to the raid by General Emilio Mola to "end the war in the North of Spain quickly" and threats apparently made against Republicans in Bilbao afterward implied a blunting of strategy and that air raids were effective and set to become an increasingly favorite instrument in the Nationalist war effort.

=== Other theories ===
Vidal outlines some other commonly voiced theories on the raid:

- The lack of reconnaissance missions before the bombing suggests to him that the Legion intended the destruction of the town rather than a specific target. Reconnaissance missions had been ordered as a prerequisite before raids around built-up areas on 6 January 1937. The intent of the order was to minimize civilian deaths and it had been issued by Mola, then Supreme Commander of the Air Force Salamanca.
- Since the raid appears to have ignored Mola's earlier plans for reconnaissance prior to the raid, Vidal concludes that Richthofen must have received direct orders from Mola or Franco.
- According to Nicholas Rankin:

It was von Richthofen himself who selected the mix of blast, splinter and fire bombs for this particular operation, agreed at a military conference in Burgos the night before. Von Richthofen wrote in his diary: "As it was a complete success of our 250 kg (explosive) and ECB1 (incendiary) bombs".

- In Vidal's view, such a mission would have typically used 10-kilogram bombs, and no incendiaries. Vidal also argues that the 22-ton load-out used in the raid represented a relatively large quantity for an attack on the stated primary objective. By way of comparison, Vidal indicates sources which give total tonnage of bombs dropped on the front during the first day of the offensive as sixty-six. Vidal goes on to claim that the official German account of this period in the war, "The War in the North", states that only 7.956 tons of bombs were dropped on Guernica.
- Vidal argues that the Italians had been trying to obtain a separate peace agreement with the Basque nationalists and were not inclined to jeopardize those efforts by deliberately inflicting civilian casualties.

== Legacy ==
The bombing gained immediate international media attention because of the alleged intentional targeting of civilians by aerial bombers, a strategy widely recognized as "deviant", causing "international horror".

Steer's reports on the horrors of Guernica were greatly appreciated by the Basque people. Steer had made their plight known. Basque authorities later honored his memory by naming two streets in his memory and commissioning a bronze bust of him.

Despite Francoist efforts to play down the reports, they proliferated and led to widespread international outrage at the time. Reactions to and condemnation of the bombing of Guernica is regarded by some historians as a turning point in the construction of the modern concept of human rights.

=== Picasso's painting ===
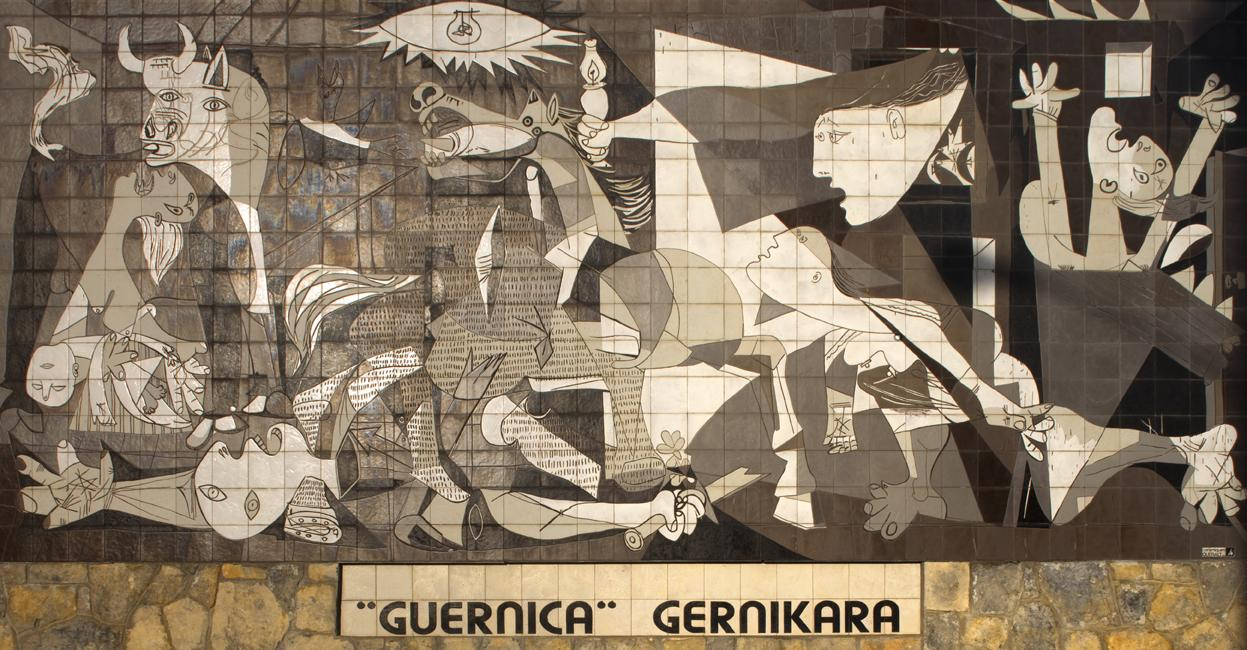
Mural in Guernica based on the Picasso painting. Basque nationalists advocate that the painting be brought to the town, as can be seen in the slogan underneath.

Guernica quickly became a world-renowned symbol of civilian suffering resulting from conflict and inspired Pablo Picasso to adapt one of his existing commissions into Guernica. The Spanish Republican Government had commissioned a work from him for the Spanish pavilion at the Paris International Exposition. Though he accepted the invitation to display a piece, he remained uninspired until he heard of the bombing of Guernica. Before the bombing of Guernica took place, Picasso never cared much for anything to do with politics. Once Picasso heard the news he changed his commissioned work for Spain into a reflection on the massacre.

Picasso began the painting on 11 May 1937, working on a piece of unbleached muslin (349 cm x 776 cm). Since the work was so large, Picasso had to use a ladder and a long-handled brush to reach the furthest corners of the canvas. He spent over two months creating Guernica. He used only black and white paint to invoke the truth-telling authority of documentary photography. "The protest is found in what has happened to the bodies, the hands, the soles of the feet, the horse's tongue, the mother's breasts, the eyes in the head—the imaginative equivalent of what happened to them in the flesh. We are made to feel their pain with our own eyes."

The display of Picasso's work at (Republican) Spain's Pavilion during the 1937 World's Fair in Paris reflected the effect on public consciousness. The painting, later adopted as a symbol of Basque nationalism during the Spanish transition to democracy, was displayed near Mercury Fountain, an overtly political work by Alexander Calder that incorporated mercury from the mines of Almadén. Today it resides in Museo Nacional Centro de Arte Reina Sofía in Madrid. A tapestry copy of Picasso's Guernica is displayed on the wall of the United Nations building in New York City, at the entrance to the Security Council room. It was placed there as a reminder of the horrors of war.

=== René Iché ===
Immediately after the bombing French sculptor René Iché created Guernica, one of his most violent and personal sculptures. He was shocked and horrified by the enormous civilian massacre and worked endlessly on the plaster statue. Iché used his daughter to model a child's body. During his lifetime, it was only exhibited once in 1940.

=== German apology ===
Recrimination for the activities of the Condor Legion and shame at the involvement of German citizens in the bombing of Guernica surfaced following German reunification in the 1990s. In 1997, the 60th anniversary of Operation Rügen, then German President Roman Herzog wrote to survivors apologizing on behalf of the German people and state for Germany's role in the Civil War in general. Herzog said he wished to extend "a hand of friendship and reconciliation" on behalf of all German citizens. This sentiment was later ratified by members of the German Parliament who went on to legislate in 1998 for the removal of all former Legion members' names from associated German military bases.

=== 70th anniversary ===
On the 70th anniversary of the bombing, the president of the Basque Parliament met with politicians, Nobel Peace Prize winner Adolfo Pérez Esquivel, and deputies from Hiroshima, Volgograd, Pforzheim, Dresden, Warsaw, and Oswiecim, as well as several survivors from Guernica itself. During the meeting they showed images and film clips of the bombing, took time to remember the 250 dead, and read the Guernica Manifesto for Peace, pleading that Guernica become a "World Capital for Peace".

=== 2016 film ===
The 2016 film Guernica leads to and culminates in the bombing of Guernica, set against the background of personalities involved in press coverage of the war.

=== Comparison to other related bombings in the Spanish Civil War ===
==== Bombings of Jaén and Córdoba ====
On 1 April 1937, at 17:20, the Spanish city of Jaén, one of the few areas in Andalusia under Republican control at that point of the Civil War, was bombed by 6 German bombers. The bombers made a single raid over the city, in which an estimated 150 people were killed. The order for the Jaén bombing was written and signed by General Gonzalo Queipo de Llano, and is preserved in the Spanish National Archives.

On 1 April 1937, at noon, the Andalusian city of Córdoba, under rebel control at the time, had been heavily bombarded by seven bombers under the command of the Republican government. The civil population was warned about the bombing. The main target of the attack was the general military hospital in the city. It is estimated that 40 people were killed by the attack, about half of them in the hospital. The same day at 20:00, the Republican government signed an order to execute "as many National prisoners as people died in the Jaén bombing." The order was carried through.

==== Bombing of Durango ====
The bombing of Durango is considered the clearest precedent for Guernica. It was perpetrated on 31 March 1937, by the Italian Air Forces in a three-raid pattern, almost identical to that carried out in Guernica. It killed an estimated 250 people and destroyed most of the city.

==== Bombings of Madrid ====
Alfredo Kindelán considers that both Guernica and Durango were "practice drills" in the development of more effective bombing strategies to use in bombings of Madrid. The city suffered a similar attack prior to the bombing of Guernica, and further attacks afterwards. Madrid presented a fierce resistance against the National troops that surpassed all of Franco's expectations and forced him to completely modify his attack strategy. A series of air bombings to demoralize the population were ordered both before and after Guernica.

==== Bombing of Cabra ====
On 7 November 1938 Cabra was subject to Republican bombing. Three Tupolev SB-2 aircraft departing from the Fuente Alamo airfield (some 300 km away) and operated by Spanish crews performed a single raid; they dropped some 1.8 tons of explosives. There were over 400 casualties recorded, 109 killed and more than 300 other. Historians described the raid as “the most deadly of those carried out by the Republic in the course of the war”. The extremely high death-to-bombs ratio (60 dead per 1 ton of explosives) was the result of 250-kg bombs exploding on the central square, crowded during the usual morning food market.

=== References made during commemorations marking other mass bombings ===
==== Bombing of Dresden ====
On 13 February 2003, during the commemoration of the 58th anniversary of the Bombing of Dresden, inhabitants of Dresden, Germany, including survivors of the firestorm of 1945, joined with witnesses of the bombing of Guernica to issue an appeal to the people of the world:

As our television sets show bombers preparing for war against Iraq, we survivors of Guernica and Dresden recall our own helplessness and horror when we were flung into the inferno of bombing—we saw people killed. Suffocated. Crushed. Incinerated. Mothers trying to protect their children with only their bodies. Old people with no strength left to flee from the flames. These pictures are still alive in our memory, and our accounts capture indelibly what we went through.

For decades we—and survivors from many other nations—have been scarred by the horror, loss and injuries we experienced in the wars of the 20th century. Today we see that the beginnings of the 21st century are also marked by suffering and destruction. On behalf of all the victims of war throughout the world we express our sympathy and solidarity with all those affected by the terror of 11 September in the US and the war in Afghanistan.

But is that very suffering now also to be inflicted upon the people of Iraq? Must thousands more die in a rain of bombs, must cities and villages be destroyed and cultural treasures obliterated?

==== Bombing of Hiroshima ====
On 26 April 2007, Dr. Tadatoshi Akiba, mayor of Hiroshima and president of Mayors for Peace, compared the experience of Guernica to Hiroshima:

Human beings have often sought to give concrete form to our powerful collective longing for peace. After World War I, that longing led to the League of Nations and numerous rules and taboos designed to govern warfare itself. Of these, the most important was the proscription against attacking and killing civilian non-combatants even in times of war. However, the second half of the twentieth century has seen most of those taboos broken. Guernica was the point of departure, and Hiroshima is the ultimate symbol. We must find ways to communicate to future generations the history of horror that began with Guernica....
In this sense, the leadership of those here in Guernica who seek peace and have worked hard to bring about this memorial ceremony is profoundly meaningful. The solidarity we feel today derives from our shared experience of the horror of war, and this solidarity can truly lead us toward a world beyond war.

== See also ==
- Condor Legion
- Aviazione Legionaria
- Bombing of Chongqing, 1938-1943
- Bombing of Wieluń
- Bombing of Tokyo
- Battle of Aleppo (2012–2016)
- Guernica (painting)
