= René Iché =

French sculptor

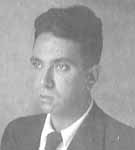
- René Iché
- Born: 21 January 1897; Sallèles-d'Aude, France
- Died: 23 December 1954 (aged 57); Paris, France
- Known for: Sculpture
- Notable work: The Torn, Guernica
- Movement: Modern art, surrealism
- Awards: Grand prix de Sculpture

René Iché (French pronunciation: [ʁəne iʃe]; 21 January 1897 – 23 December 1954) was a 20th-century French sculptor.

== Life and work ==
René Iché was born in Sallèles-d'Aude, France. He fought in World War I, where he was injured and gassed. After the war, he earned a degree in law, but also studied sculpture with Antoine Bourdelle and architecture with Auguste Perret. In 1927, his pacific monument of Ouveillan (a Monumental Modern church in the South of France) was well received. During his first solo exhibition, at the art dealer Léopold Zborowski in 1931, two sculptures were acquired by the Musée National d'Art Moderne in Paris (now in the Centre Georges Pompidou) and the Museum Boijmans Van Beuningen in Rotterdam.

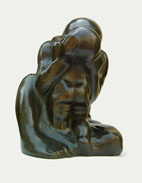
Père et Fils (1925)

In 1928, he married his model Rosa Achard, known as Renée. His daughter Laurence, who later became a writer, was a model for some of his work.

Iché was a very good friend of Max Jacob, close to Guillaume Apollinaire, Picasso, Jacques Lipchitz, Zadkine and a childhood friend of Joë Bousquet. He sculpted the faces of André Breton, Paul Éluard and Federico García Lorca.

In his studio of Montparnasse, in 1937, he executed a Guernica sculpture on the day (27 April 1937) of the announcement of this event on the radio station. Upon completing the work he did not wish to exhibit it.

He was amongst the 200 pioneers of the French Resistance – he was in the Groupe du musée de l'Homme – during the summer of 1940 and participated at the Degenerate art exhibitions. He sculpted so La Déchirée (The Torn), which was brought to London and given to General Charles de Gaulle, became one of the symbols of the French Resistance.

He participated at the Venice Biennale in 1948 with Le Couple (Musée d'Art Moderne de la Ville de Paris) and received the Grand Prix de Sculpture in 1953 for Melpomène 36. His work was also part of the sculpture event in the art competition at the 1948 Summer Olympics. He was chosen to sculpt the Apollinaire Monument in Paris and an Auschwitz' Memorial in Poland, but both projects were interrupted by his premature death in Paris.

Iché's work is close to surrealism and like the sculptors Alberto Giacometti and Germaine Richier inherits an aesthetic born from the workshop of Antoine Bourdelle.

On the manure of the Millennia after geological cataclysms and warlike disasters, only the statues will remain.

— René Iché

== Film ==
Jean-Pierre Melville's film Army of Shadows (L'Armée des ombres, 1969) is based, like the novel of Joseph Kessel, on the Resistance network to which Iché belonged, Cohors-Asturies. The character of Luc Jardie (Paul Meurisse) is inspired by Iché.

== See also ==
- Art manifesto
