= Laurence Iché =

French poet

- Born: 9 April 1921 Saint-Étienne, France
- Died: 9 September 2007 (aged 86) Madrid, Spain
- Partner: Robert Rius (m. 1941; died 1944) Manuel Viola (m. 1949; died 1987)
- Relatives: René Iché (father)

Laurence Iché (9 April 1921 – 9 September 2007) was a French writer.

== Biography ==
Laurence Iché was born in Saint-Étienne on 9 April 1921. She was the daughter of the sculptor René Iché and Rosa Achard. As a young girl, Iché posed as a model for her father, as well as for Pablo Picasso, Victor Brauner and other artists. In 1937, at the age of sixteen, she was placed into a Benedictine convent at the suggestion of Max Jacob, but her stay there was brief.

Beginning in 1939, she began to write stories, articles and poetry. During World War II, she helped establish the surrealist group La Main à plume and founded the review of the same name. In 1942, she published a collection of poems Au fil du vent, illustrated by Óscar Domínguez, in which two of her poems were included: "Scissors Strokes by the Clock" and "I Prefer Your Uneasiness Like a Dark Lantern." She also translated poetry by Camilo José Cela into French. Her book of stories Etagère en flamme, cuentos, illustrated by Picasso, was published in 1943 and included two of her stories, "Unpublished Correspondence" and "The Philosophers' Stone." Iché participated in the 2006 conference Surrealismo Siglo XXI.

In 1940, she joined the French resistance against Nazi occupation. She modelled for René Iché's piece, la Déchirée. Sculpted from bronze, this piece was an important symbol of the resistance movement. It was gifted to Charles de Gaulle in London, but the sculpture has since disappeared.

She married the poet Robert Rius in 1941. On 4 July 1944 Rius was arrested for his involvement with a maquis near Fontainebleau by the Gestapo. He was executed by firing squad on 21 July 1944. In 1949, she married the Spanish painter Manuel Viola until his death in on 8 March 1987 from lung cancer.

Iché died in Madrid at the age of 86.
