= Massacre in Korea =

1951 painting by Pablo Picasso

- Artist: Pablo Picasso
- Year: 1951
- Medium: Oil on plywood
- Dimensions: 110 cm × 210 cm (43.3 in × 82.7 in)
- Location: Musée Picasso, Paris

Massacre in Korea (French: Massacre en Corée) is an oil painting completed on 18 January 1951 by Pablo Picasso. Picasso's third anti-war painting after Guernica and The Charnel House, Massacre depicts a scene of a massacre of a group of naked women and children by a firing squad. It has been considered to be a condemnation of American intervention in the Korean War. The painting is housed at the Musée Picasso in Paris.

== Background ==
=== Pablo Picasso (1881–1973) ===
Massacre in Korea is the third in a series of anti-war paintings created by Picasso. It was preceded by the monumental Guernica, painted in 1937, and The Charnel House, painted from 1944 to 1945. The title of this painting refers to the outbreak of the Korean War, which had started in the previous year, yet the subject matter is ambiguous, as Picasso does not point directly to a period or location within the composition.

Picasso was exposed to the effects of war throughout his entire life and this had a direct impact on his artwork. From a young age, he began to include war motifs in his work. When the Spanish Civil War broke out, Picasso was deeply affected by it, which led to his painting of Guernica in 1937. Although Picasso did not take part in any war or serve as a soldier, he would use his artwork to make political statements. He claimed that his artwork was a "journal" that documented not only his personal life, but also the conflicts of his era. World War II marked a period of major upheaval and during this period, Picasso lived in occupied Paris. When France was liberated from the German occupation, he became committed to using his art for political statements. His post-war art therefore displays anti-war images and symbols of peace. Reports of German atrocities in the Holocaust are also thought to be the main inspiration behind the unfinished Charnel House, though its content was drawn from Picasso's experiences in Spain similar to Guernica.

== Analysis ==
=== Description ===
The painting identifies neither the victims nor the soldiers, and the women are not given Asian features. The art historian Kirsten Hoving Keen writes that it was "inspired by reports of American atrocities" in Korea, and Utley argues that the soldiers' machine-like character would have marked them as American to anyone familiar with communist propaganda. Picasso painted the scene on an unusually long plywood panel in a restricted palette of grays, greens and yellow, arranging it as a frieze of two opposed groups. On the left, nude women and children stand in front of an open grave; on the right, a squad of armed men takes aim at them. The women are set against green hills scattered with ruins and the soldiers against a gray sky with fires in the distance, a contrast Utley reads as marking the men as invaders.

The women's expressions range from terror and grief to resignation. Among them are pregnant women and a mother clutching an infant; one child runs toward the group, another hides against its mother, and the youngest plays on the ground, oblivious. Utley reads the group through the traditional theme of the three ages of woman, finding a Venus Pudica gesture in the girl who covers herself and an echo of the Ecce Homo in the closed eyes and open palms of the eldest woman, who stands at the apex of the group. The soldiers are nude apart from helmets and pieces of armor, with oversized hands and feet and a robotic stiffness; their weapons are joined into a single mass, and the figure at the far right, possibly their officer, holds a club and raises a sword above the others' heads.

=== Iconography and interpretation ===
Francisco Goya, The Third of May 1808, 1814, Museo del Prado

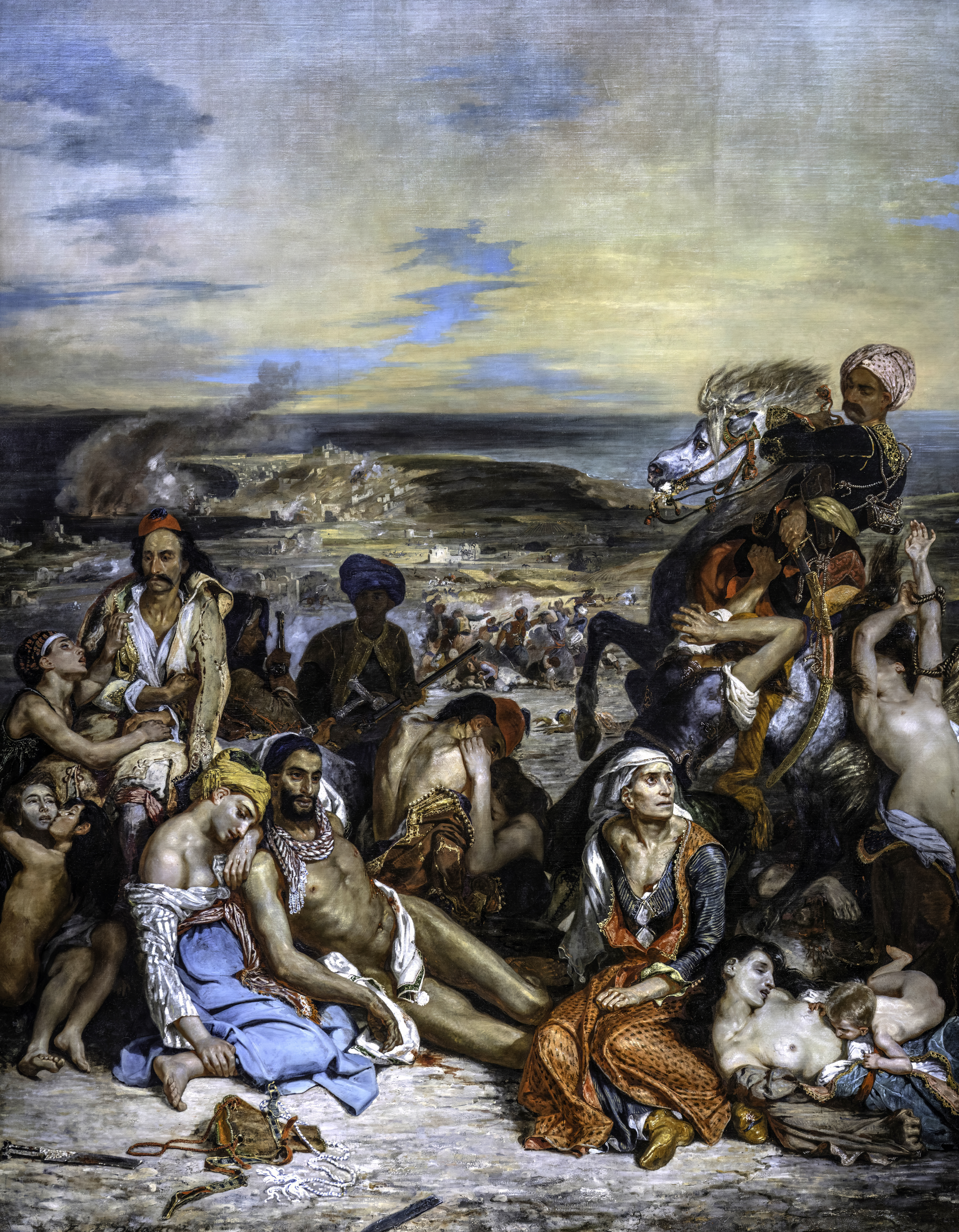
Eugène Delacroix, The Massacre at Chios, oil on canvas, 1824, Louvre, Paris

Museu Picasso de Barcelona describes the painting as, "one of Picasso's most important pacifist works in defense of human rights, beyond ideologies and sides." Pierre Daix, an expert on Picasso, opined that the painting has "entered within the great tradition of paintings of cruelty, a 20th century version of the Massacre of the Innocents". The mother and infant are closely related to Maternité, a small panel of Françoise Gilot and Paloma that Picasso painted the same day; Pierre Daix tied the painting to Picasso's own young children. The gear of soldiers mixes the medieval with the futuristic: Utley notes that it would suit the Trojan War, the Crusades or an interplanetary war equally well, and Keene that the helmets evoke both medieval warriors and astronauts. For Keene, this conflation of periods places the killing within the long history of warfare.

The armored figures also anticipate the knights that proliferate in Picasso's drawings, prints and paintings of the following months, such as Jeu de pages (24 February 1951). Utley and Keene both read the confrontation in gendered terms. Utley describes a set of oppositions, rounded flesh against metallic automata and passivity against aggression, that gives the work a strong sexual charge; Keene sees the officer's sword, pointed at the women, as phallic. Utley also relates the scene to Holocaust photographs of similar executions, observing that communist artists were then transferring such imagery to current conflicts, in line with the party's equation of Americans with Nazis.

The composition derives from Goya's The Third of May 1808 (1814), which had also served Manet for The Execution of Emperor Maximilian (1867–1869). Utley finds a closer precedent for the faceless, machine-like executioners in No se puede mirar (One Can't Look), plate 26 of Goya's The Disasters of War. Goya's prints had been exhibited in Paris in December 1950, and L'Humanité reproduced the plate on 12 December. She endorses a critic's description of the rigid composition as Davidian, hearing echoes of Jacques-Louis David's Oath of the Horatii and The Intervention of the Sabine Women in the soldiers' forward stride and the confrontation of the sexes, and of Delacroix's The Massacre at Chios in the sweep of the landscape. Keene adds Poussin's The Massacre of the Innocents. Along with Guernica and The Charnel House (1944–45), this is one of Picasso's works that he composed to depict the politics of his time.

=== Reception ===
Massacre in Korea is often overlooked and overshadowed in cultural consciousness by Guernica. It is more literal in its visual storytelling than the fragmented symbolism of the earlier, more famous work. When the painting was first viewed in 1951, it was not well received. Isabelle Limousin, exhibition curator, explained that the work was dismissed, as "too easy, too readable for contemporaries of the artist", yet she considers it to be "a very strong work".

In 1952 the painting was shown in Warsaw in the Wystawa współczesnej plastyki francuskiej (Exhibition of Contemporary French Art), held by the Central Bureau of Art Exhibitions (CBWA) in the Zachęta building from 17 March to 15 April and seen by 14,084 visitors. Its official organizers were Poland's Committee for Cultural Cooperation with Foreign Countries and the Polish–French Friendship Society, but the exhibition was assembled by the French Communist Party, with André Fougeron chiefly responsible for its shape, and French socialist realists (Note: Socialist realism was proclaimed at the First All-Union Congress of Soviet Writers in 1934 as the approved method for Soviet artists in all media. Its formula, to depict reality "in its revolutionary development", prescribed no style; the doctrine took shape in practice through campaigns against "formalism", renewed under Andrei Zhdanov from 1946. Poland, Hungary and Czechoslovakia adopted it as official doctrine in 1949–50. It also bound communist artists in the West. The French Communist Party expected its artists to closely follow the doctrine, which is evident in the work of painters such as André Fougeron and Boris Taslitzky.) dominated the selection. Later Polish scholarship has attended to the exhibition chiefly because of its modernists, above all this painting: Katarzyna Murawska-Muthesius credits the painting with a subversive role in loosening socialist realism's rules.

During the Hungarian Revolution of 1956, a reproduction of the painting draped in black was displayed outside the Academy of Fine Arts in Warsaw on Krakowskie Przedmieście as a protest against the Soviet intervention. In that setting, Keene observes, the executioners were read as Soviet soldiers and the victims as Hungarian civilians. Utley argues that only in this new context did the painting convey the universality of its anti-militarist message.

== 2022 incident ==
On 9 October 2022, two activists from the environmental pressure group Extinction Rebellion glued their hands to the painting using superglue while it was on loan to the National Gallery of Victoria in Melbourne. Their hands were attached to the perspex glazing protecting the painting and removed without damage to the artwork. The activists were arrested but later released without charge.

== See also ==
- Anti-American sentiment in Korea
- Bodo League massacre
- Dove – lithograph by Picasso (1949)
- List of massacres in South Korea
- No Gun Ri massacre

== Sources ==
- Daix, Pierre (1987). Picasso. London: Thames & Hudson.
- Elliott, David; Juszkiewicz, Piotr (2 October 2012) [2003]. "Socialist Realism". Grove Art Online. Oxford University Press. doi:10.1093/gao/9781884446054.article.T079464.
- Keen, Kirsten Hoving (July 1980). "Picasso's Communist Interlude: The Murals of 'War' and 'Peace'". The Burlington Magazine. 122 (928): 464–470.
- Keene, Judith (2017). "Framing Violence, Framing Victims: Picasso's Forgotten Painting of the Korean War". Cultural History. 6 (1): 80–101. doi:10.3366/cult.2017.0136.
- Utley, Gertje R. (2000). Picasso: The Communist Years. New Haven: Yale University Press. ISBN 978-0-300-08251-7.
- Zychowicz, Karolina (2014). Paryska lewica w stalinowskiej Warszawie: Wystawa współczesnej plastyki francuskiej w CBWA w 1952 roku. Archiwum Zachęty (in Polish). Warsaw: Zachęta – Narodowa Galeria Sztuki. ISBN 978-83-64714-00-9.
