= The Charnel House =

Unfinished painting by Pablo Picasso

- Artist: Pablo Picasso
- Year: 1944–1945
- Medium: Oil and charcoal on canvas
- Dimensions: 199.8 cm × 250.1 cm (78.7 in × 98.5 in)
- Location: Museum of Modern Art; New York

The Charnel House (French: Le Charnier) is an unfinished 1944–1945 oil and charcoal on canvas painting by Spanish artist Pablo Picasso, which is purported to deal with the Nazi genocide of the Holocaust. The black and white 'grisaille' composition centres on a massed pile of corpses and was based primarily upon film and photographs of a slaughtered family during the Spanish Civil War. It is considered to be the second of three major anti-war Picassos, preceded by Guernica in 1937 and succeeded by Massacre in Korea in 1951. The painting is housed in the Museum of Modern Art in New York City.

== Background ==
This painting is considered to be an anti-war statement, yet Picasso was largely apolitical until the Spanish Civil War. His art dealer Daniel-Henry Kahnweiler said that he had been the "most apolitical man" he had ever known. The Spanish Civil War caused Picasso to become more concerned with politics, which led to the creation of his first anti-war painting, Guernica in 1937. In 1945, Picasso asserted his political role as an artist.

What do you think an artist is? An imbecile who has only eyes if he's a painter, or ears if he's a musician, or a lyre at every level of his heart if he's a poet, or even, if he's a boxer, just his muscles? On the contrary, he's at the same time a political being, constantly alive to heartrending, fiery, or happy events, to which he responds in every way [...] No, painting is not done to decorate apartments. It is an instrument of war for attack and defense against the enemy.

During World War II, Picasso lived in Paris, while it was occupied by the Nazis. Despite their attempts to win over French intellectuals with offers of food and coal, Picasso was persistently defiant, stating that, "A Spaniard is never cold". The impact of the Second World War resulted in many of Picasso's artworks becoming more political, and he depicted the effects of the occupation in dark, grey hues. The Charnel House is considered to be Picasso's most political painting since he painted Guernica in 1937. It was inspired by a documentary about a Spanish Republican family who were killed in their kitchen. The subject matter had particular significance to Picasso, as he had lost many friends during the war. It therefore represented a memorial to the Spanish Republicans who lost their lives during the occupation of France. Over the course of the Nazi occupation, approximately 75,000 people were executed in the region of Paris. Many French intellectuals died during this period, such as Robert Desnos, Otto Freundlich and Max Jacob. Other artists managed to escape France to reach other countries, such as Marc Chagall, Marcel Duchamp, Fernand Léger, Alberto Giacometti and Max Ernst.

In the autumn of 1944, Picasso was reported to have stated, "I did not paint the war, because I am not one of those artists who go looking for a subject like a photographer, but there is no doubt that the war is there in the pictures which I painted then."

== Description ==
The Charnel House is a sombre painting of a jumble of figures beneath a dining room table. It represents a murdered family that appears similar to the piles of bodies discovered in Nazi concentration camps at the point of their liberation. Picasso stated that the work was a response to the first photographs that were taken in the concentration camps. The black and white palette reflects the war photographs that inspired the painting. Picasso created the image between 1944 and 1945, using oil and charcoal on canvas. The painting measures 199.8 cm x 250.1 cm.

Echoing the composition of Guernica, Picasso used Expressionist forms to convey the tortured images of the figures, using funereal shades of gray, white and black. The image depicts the contorted bodies of a man, woman and child, who are sprawled on the floor beneath a table that holds eating utensils. Soon after its completion, the work was described by Alfred H. Barr Jr., as "a Pieta without grief, an entombment without mourners, a requiem without pomp."

While creating the painting, Picasso is known to have made changes to the composition, evidenced by photographs taken in 1945 that documented the progress of the work. These changes included the evolving facial expressions of the figures. Picasso outlined the structure of the composition, before applying charcoal to the picture. The final image is incomplete, showing exposed areas of canvas, however Picasso was satisfied with it and donated it to the National Association of Veterans of the Resistance in 1946. Later that year he asked for it to be returned to make alterations to the painting. He then kept it in his possession until 1954, when it was sold to an American collector.

The use of a palette limited to black, white and grey is particularly notable in the composition of this painting. Picasso claimed that colour weakened the image and he therefore removed colour from his works in order to emphasise formal structure. His use of black and grey can be traced back to his Blue and Rose periods and continued through to these later depictions of war atrocities. Picasso's obsession with line and form and monochromatic values is reminiscent of Palaeolithic cave paintings and European drawing. This predominant use of black and grey also featured in the works of Spanish masters, like El Greco, José de Ribera, Francisco de Zurbarán, Diego Velázquez, and Francisco de Goya, which influenced Picasso's art.

Picasso spent at least six months working on The Charnel House which has iconographic links to the graphic work of Picasso's Spanish compatriot Francisco de Goya (1746–1828). Picasso's friend and biographer Pierre Daix records that the title of the painting was not originally assigned to it by Picasso himself – the artist referred to The Charnel House as simply "my painting" or "the massacre"; nevertheless, in later years after the Second World War Picasso refused to retitle the painting once its identity as The Charnel House gained popularity, and it was first exhibited as such following Picasso's joining of the Communist Party of Spain in 1946.

== Significance and legacy ==
William Rubin, curator at the Museum of Modern Art, said of the painting, "Its grisaille harmonies distantly echo the black and white of the newspaper images but, more crucially, establish the proper key for a requiem".

Clement Greenberg for ArtForum opines that, "Charnel House is magnificently lyrical—and Picasso at his best is usually lyrical. And it is fitting that this picture should be lyrical, for it is an elegy, not an outcry or even a protest, and it is fitting that an elegy should chant rather than intone."

Adrian Searle for The Guardian commented that, "It is a deceptively complex and rich painting, with an amazing tension between the subject and the language used to depict it – the slaughtered family heaped dead under a kitchen table, their bodies intertwined. The more you stare at it, the more you get entwined, too.

In New York Magazine, Mark Stevens opined, "The Charnel House is yet another example of Picasso’s sublime intuition about how an artist must approach the century's horrors. Not long after he painted the picture, writers would argue that art must fall mute before the Holocaust – that no image could represent its meaning in anything but the most broken, partial manner. In The Charnel House, Picasso begins but does not presume to end the accounting of the Holocaust: His lines fade toward nothingness."

On the painting's significance, William Rubin, director of painting and sculpture at the Museum of Modern Art said, "I saw The Charnel House as a kind of sequel, almost, to the larger subject of Guernica. If Guernica, inspired by the Spanish Civil War, raises the curtain on World War II, then The Charnel House, done in 1945, lowers it. It can't fill the gap left by Guernica, but it will play a role representing the collective-oriented Picasso, which is very rare."

== Provenance ==
William Rubin for the Museum of Modern Art, purchased The Charnel House from the collection of Walter P. Chrysler Jr. for the equivalent of $1 million.

== See also ==
- Guernica
- Dove
- Massacre in Korea
- List of Picasso artworks 1941–1950

== Works cited ==
- Daix, Pierre (1987). Picasso. London: Thames & Hudson.
