= The Third of May 1808 =

1814 painting by Francisco de Goya

- Artist: Francisco Goya
- Year: 1814
- Medium: Oil on canvas
- Dimensions: 268 cm × 347 cm (106 in × 137 in)
- Location: Museo del Prado, Madrid

The Third of May 1808 in Madrid (commonly known as The Third of May 1808) and also known, in Spanish, as El tres de mayo de 1808 en Madrid or Los fusilamientos de la montaña del Príncipe Pío, or Los fusilamientos del tres de mayo, is a painting completed in 1814 by the Spanish painter Francisco Goya. In the work, Goya sought to commemorate Spanish resistance to Napoleon's armies during the occupation of Madrid in 1808 at the start of the Peninsular War. Along with its companion piece of the same size, The Second of May 1808 (or The Charge of the Mamelukes), it was commissioned by the provisional government of Spain at Goya's own suggestion shortly after the ousting of the French occupation and the restoration of King Ferdinand VII.

The painting's content, presentation, and emotional force secure its status as a ground-breaking, archetypal image of the horrors of war. Although it draws on many sources from both high and popular art, The Third of May marks a clear break from convention. By diverging from the traditions of Christian art and traditional depictions of war, it has no distinct precedent, and is acknowledged as one of the first paintings of the modern era. According to the art historian Kenneth Clark, it is "the first great picture which can be called revolutionary in every sense of the word, in style, in subject, and in intention".

The Third of May 1808 inspired Gerald Holtom's peace sign and a number of later major paintings, including a series by Édouard Manet, and Pablo Picasso's Massacre in Korea and Guernica. The painting currently resides in the Museo del Prado, Madrid.

== Background ==
Napoleon I of France declared himself First Consul of the French Republic on November 10, 1799, and crowned himself Emperor in 1804. Because Spain controlled access to the Mediterranean, the country was politically and strategically important to French interests. The reigning Spanish sovereign, Charles IV, was internationally regarded as ineffectual. Even in his own court he was seen as a "half-wit king who renounces cares of state for the satisfaction of hunting", and a cuckold unable to control his energetic wife, Maria Luisa of Parma. Napoleon took advantage of the weak king by suggesting the two nations conquer and divide Portugal, with France and Spain each taking a third of the spoils, and the final third going to the Spanish prime minister Manuel de Godoy, along with the title Prince of the Algarve. Godoy was seduced, and accepted the French offer. He failed, however, to grasp Napoleon's true intentions, and was unaware that his new ally and co-sovereign, the king's son Ferdinand VII of Spain, was using the invasion merely as a ploy to seize the Spanish parliament and throne. Ferdinand intended not only that Godoy be killed during the impending power struggle, but also that the lives of his own parents be sacrificed.

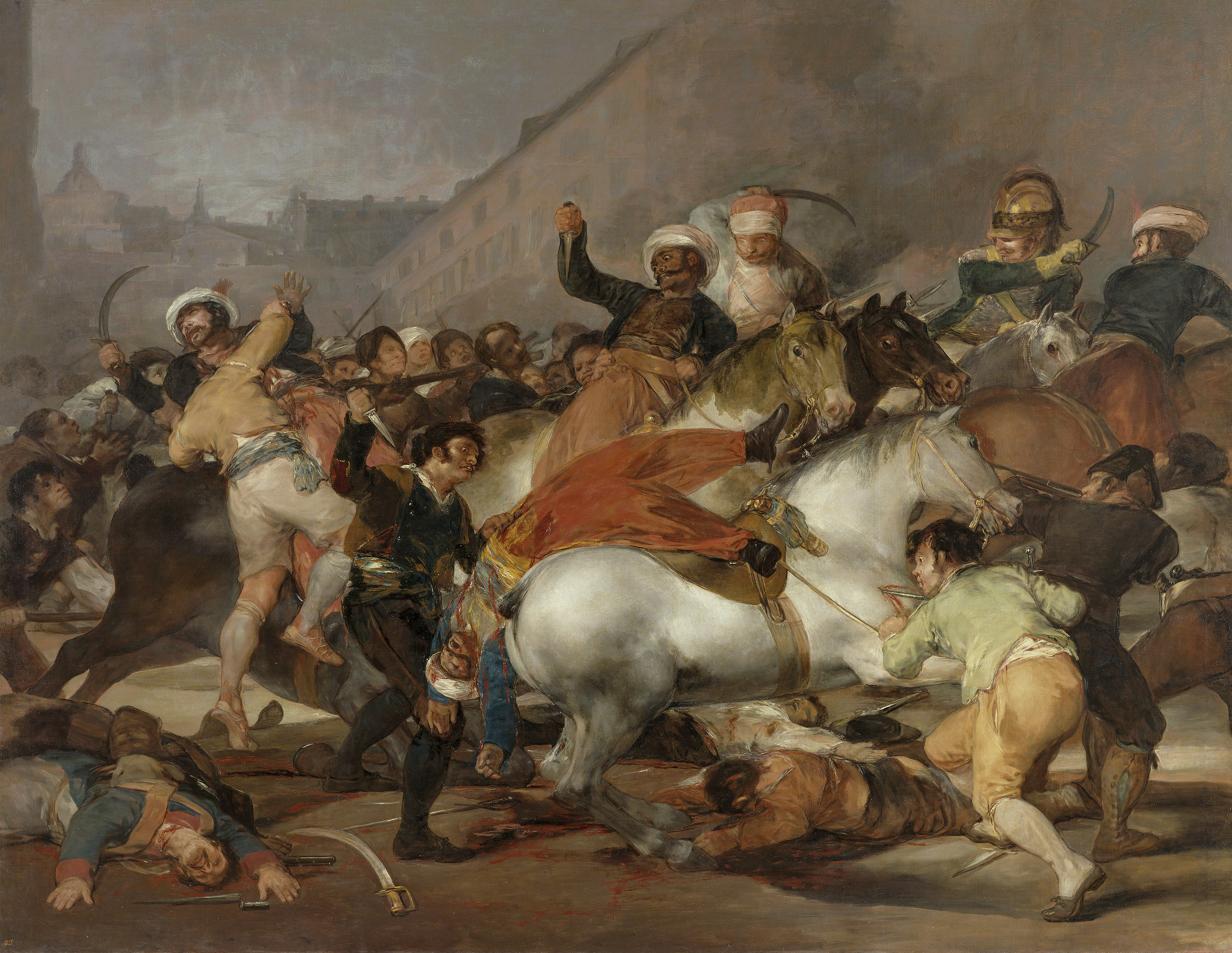
The Second of May 1808 was completed in 1814, two months before its companion work The Third of May 1808. It depicts the uprising that precipitated the executions of the third of May.

Under the guise of reinforcing the Spanish armies and marching over Lisbon to capture the members of the House of Braganza before the eventual transfer of the Portuguese court to Brazil, 23,000 French troops entered Spain unopposed in November 1807. Even when Napoleon's intentions became clear the following February, the occupying forces found little resistance apart from isolated actions in disconnected areas, including Zaragoza. Napoleon's principal commander, Marshal Joachim Murat, believed that Spain would benefit from rulers more progressive and competent than the Bourbons, and Napoleon's brother Joseph Bonaparte was to be made king. After Napoleon convinced Ferdinand to return Spanish rule to Charles IV, the latter was left with no choice but to abdicate, on March 19, 1808, in favor of Joseph Bonaparte.

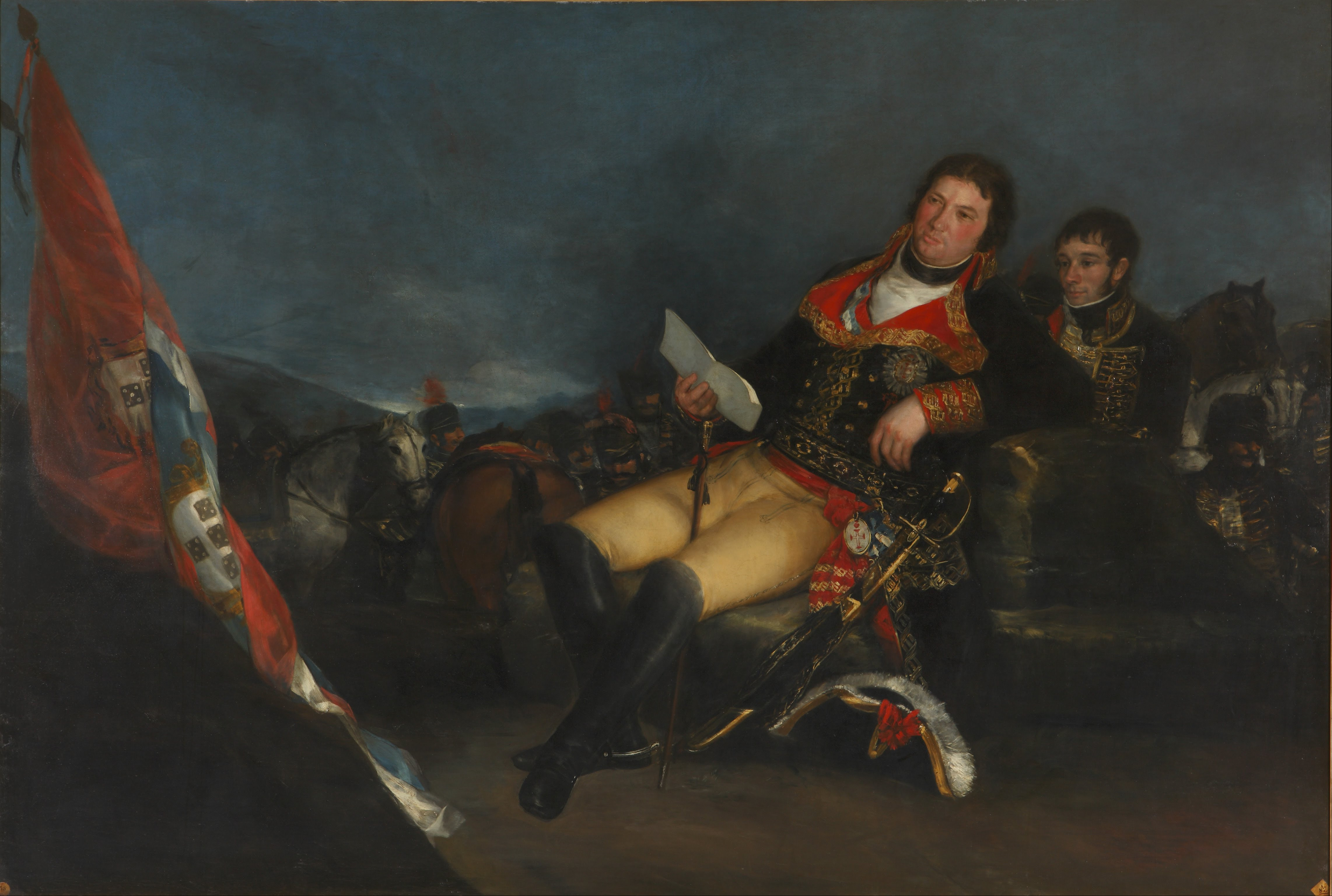
Goya's Manuel Godoy, Duke of Alcudia, Prince of the Peace, 1801. Godoy was prime minister of Spain during the 1808 Napoleonic invasion of Spain.

Although the Spanish people had accepted foreign monarchs in the past, they deeply resented the new French ruler. A French agent in Madrid wrote that "Spain is different. The Spaniards have a noble and generous character, but they have a tendency to ferocity and cannot bear to be treated as a conquered nation. Reduced to despair, they would be prepared to unleash the most terrible and courageous rebellion, and the most vicious excesses." On May 2, 1808, provoked by news of the planned removal to France of the last members of the Spanish royal family, the people of Madrid rebelled in the Dos de Mayo Uprising. A proclamation issued that day to his troops by Marshal Murat read: "The population of Madrid, led astray, has given itself to revolt and murder. French blood has flowed. It demands vengeance. All those arrested in the uprising, arms in hand, will be shot." Goya commemorated the uprising in his The Second of May, which depicts a cavalry charge against the rebels in the Puerta del Sol square in the center of Madrid, the site of several hours of fierce combat. Much the better known of the pair, The Third of May illustrates the French reprisals: before dawn the next day hundreds of Spaniards were rounded up and shot, at a number of locations around Madrid. Civilian Spanish opposition persisted as a feature of the ensuing five-year Peninsular War, the first to be called guerrilla war. Irregular Spanish forces considerably aided the Spanish, Portuguese, and British armies jointly led by Arthur Wellesley, who first landed in Portugal in August 1808. By the time of the painting's conception, the public imagination had made the rioters symbols of heroism and patriotism.

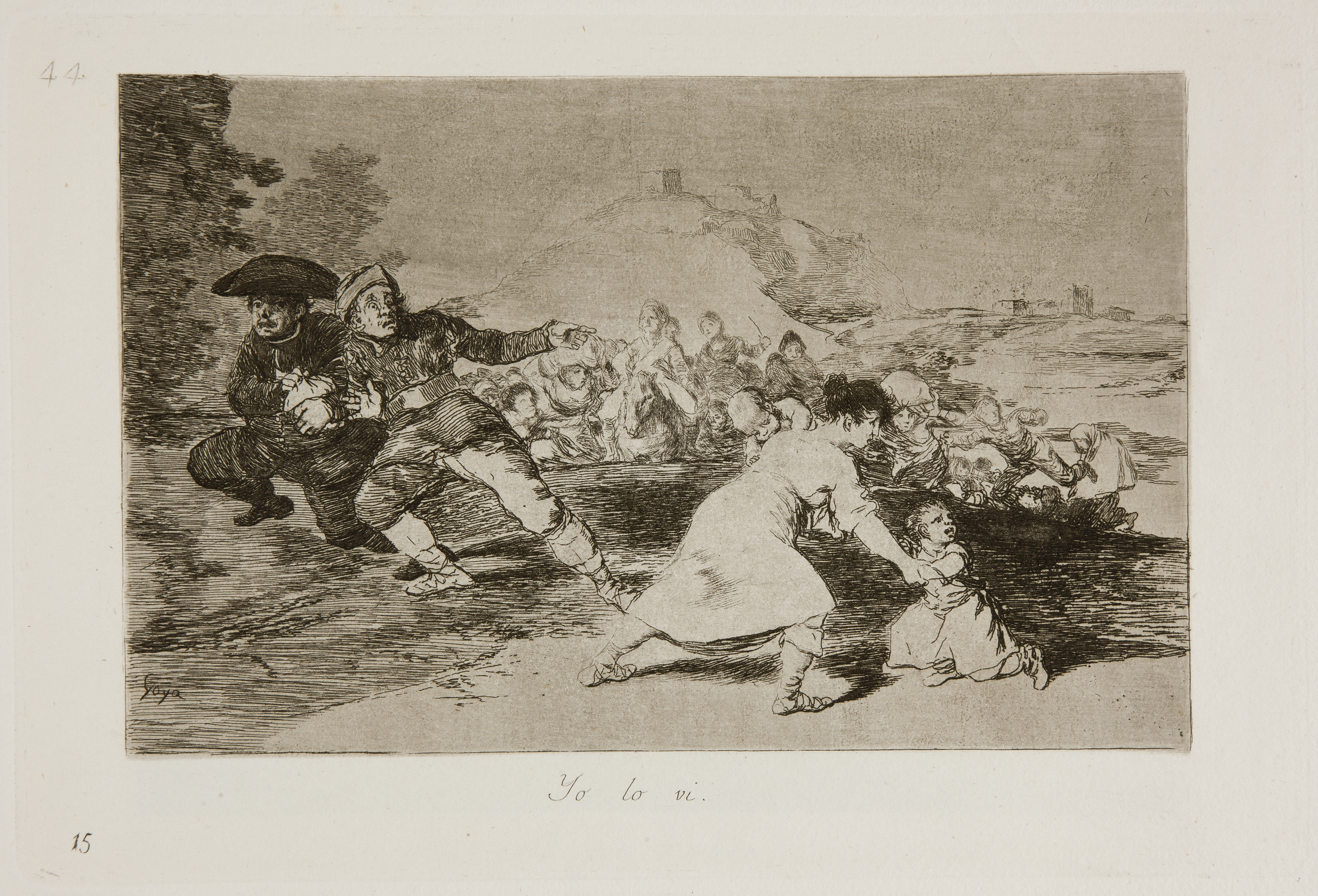
Yo lo vi (I saw it), in The Disasters of War (Los desastres de la guerra, plate 44, c. 1810–1812

Like other Spanish liberals, Goya was placed in a difficult position by the French invasion. He had supported the initial aims of the French Revolution, and hoped for a similar development in Spain. Several of his friends, like the poets Juan Meléndez Valdés and Leandro Fernández de Moratín, were overt Afrancesados, the term for the supporters—collaborators in the view of many—of Joseph Bonaparte. Goya's 1798 portrait of the French ambassador-turned-commandant Ferdinand Guillemardet betrays a personal admiration. (Note: Guillemardet came to Spain as French ambassador, and was the first foreigner Goya painted. Later Guillemardet brought a copy of the artist's Caprichos back to France, where they were admired by Delacroix, and influenced the Romantic movement.) Although he maintained his position as court painter, for which an oath of loyalty to Joseph was necessary, Goya had by nature an instinctive dislike of authority. He witnessed the subjugation of his countrymen by the French troops. During these years he painted little, although the experiences of the occupation provided inspiration for drawings that would form the basis for his prints The Disasters of War (Los desastres de la guerra).

In February 1814, after the final expulsion of the French, Goya approached the provisional government with a request to "perpetuate by means of his brush the most notable and heroic actions of our glorious insurrection against the Tyrant of Europe". His proposal accepted, Goya began work on The Third of May. It is not known whether he had personally witnessed either the rebellion or the reprisals, despite many later attempts to place him at the events of either day.

== The painting ==
=== Description ===
The Third of May 1808 is set in the early hours of the morning following the uprising and centers on two masses of men: one a rigidly poised firing squad, the other a disorganized group of captives held at gunpoint. Executioners and victims face each other abruptly across a narrow space; according to Kenneth Clark, "by a stroke of genius [Goya] has contrasted the fierce repetition of the soldiers' attitudes and the steely line of their rifles, with the crumbling irregularity of their target." A square lantern situated on the ground between the two groups throws a dramatic light on the scene. The brightest illumination falls on the huddled victims to the left, whose numbers include a monk or friar in prayer. (Note: This is consistent with Murat's desire to choose as victims members of the lower classes and the clergy who organized them.) To the immediate right and at the center of the canvas, other condemned figures stand next in line to be shot. (Note: It has been suggested that the disarray in which Goya depicted the victims was a decision of prudence: popular resistance to French forces could be memorialized, so long as there was no show of solidarity which would be threatening to the government of Fernando VII. The central figure is the brilliantly lit man kneeling amid the bloodied corpses of those already executed, his arms flung wide in either appeal or defiance. His yellow and white clothing repeats the colors of the lantern. His plain white shirt and sun-burnt face show he is a simple laborer.)

On the right side stands the firing squad, engulfed in shadow and painted as a monolithic unit. Seen nearly from behind, their bayonets and their shako headgear form a relentless and immutable column. Most of the faces of the figures cannot be seen, but the face of the man to the right of the main victim, peeping fearfully towards the soldiers, acts as a repoussoir at the back of the central group. Without distracting from the intensity of the foreground drama, a townscape with a steeple looms in the nocturnal distance, probably including the barracks used by the French. (Note: Now the site of the transplanted Nubian temple, the Temple of Debod) In the background between the hillside and the shakos is a crowd with torches: perhaps onlookers, perhaps more soldiers or victims.

The Second and Third of May are thought to have been intended as parts of a larger series. Written commentary and circumstantial evidence suggest that Goya painted four large canvases memorializing the rebellion of May 1808. In his memoirs of the Royal Academy in 1867, José Caveda wrote of four paintings by Goya of the second of May, and Cristóbal Ferriz—an artist and a collector of Goya—mentioned two other paintings on the theme: a revolt at the royal palace and a defense of artillery barracks. Contemporary prints stand as precedents for such a series. The disappearance of two paintings may indicate official displeasure with the depiction of popular insurrection.

=== The Disasters of War ===
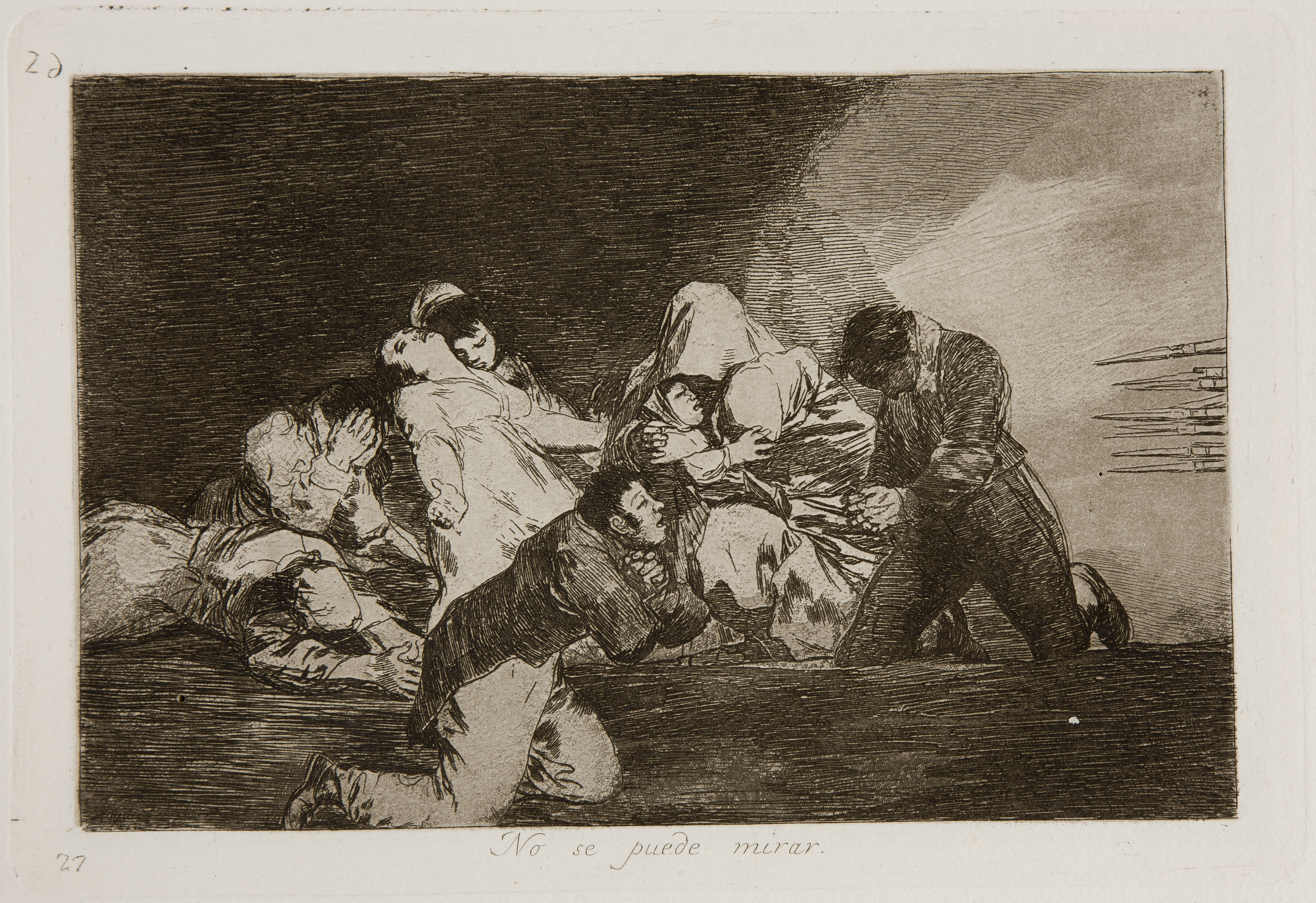
Goya's No se puede mirar (One cannot look at this) in The Disasters of War (Los desastres de la guerra), c. 1810–1812. This is a very similar composition—though Goya was freer in expression in the prints than the paintings, in which he conformed more to traditional conventions.

Goya's series of aquatint etchings The Disasters of War (Los desastres de la guerra) was not completed until 1820, although most of the prints were made in the period 1810–1814. The album of proofs given by Goya to a friend, however, now in the British Museum, provides many indications of the order in which both the preliminary drawings and the prints themselves were composed. (Note: There were probably preliminary drawings for all of the prints. The album shows a preliminary numbering system, different from the one Goya finally settled on, which probably relates to the order of composition. For example Yo lo vi is no. 15 in the first sequence, and no. 44 in the final sequence. After the earlier no. 19 Goya ran out of good drawing paper from the Netherlands, and began to use whatever he could find.) The groups identified as the earliest clearly seem to predate the commission for the two paintings, and include two prints with obviously related compositions (illustrated), as well as I saw this, which is presumably a scene witnessed during Goya's trip to Saragossa. No se puede mirar (One cannot look at this) is clearly related compositionally and thematically; the female central figure has her arms outstretched, but pointing down, while another figure has his hands clasped in prayer, and several others shield or hide their faces. This time the soldiers are not visible even from behind; only the bayonets of their guns are seen.

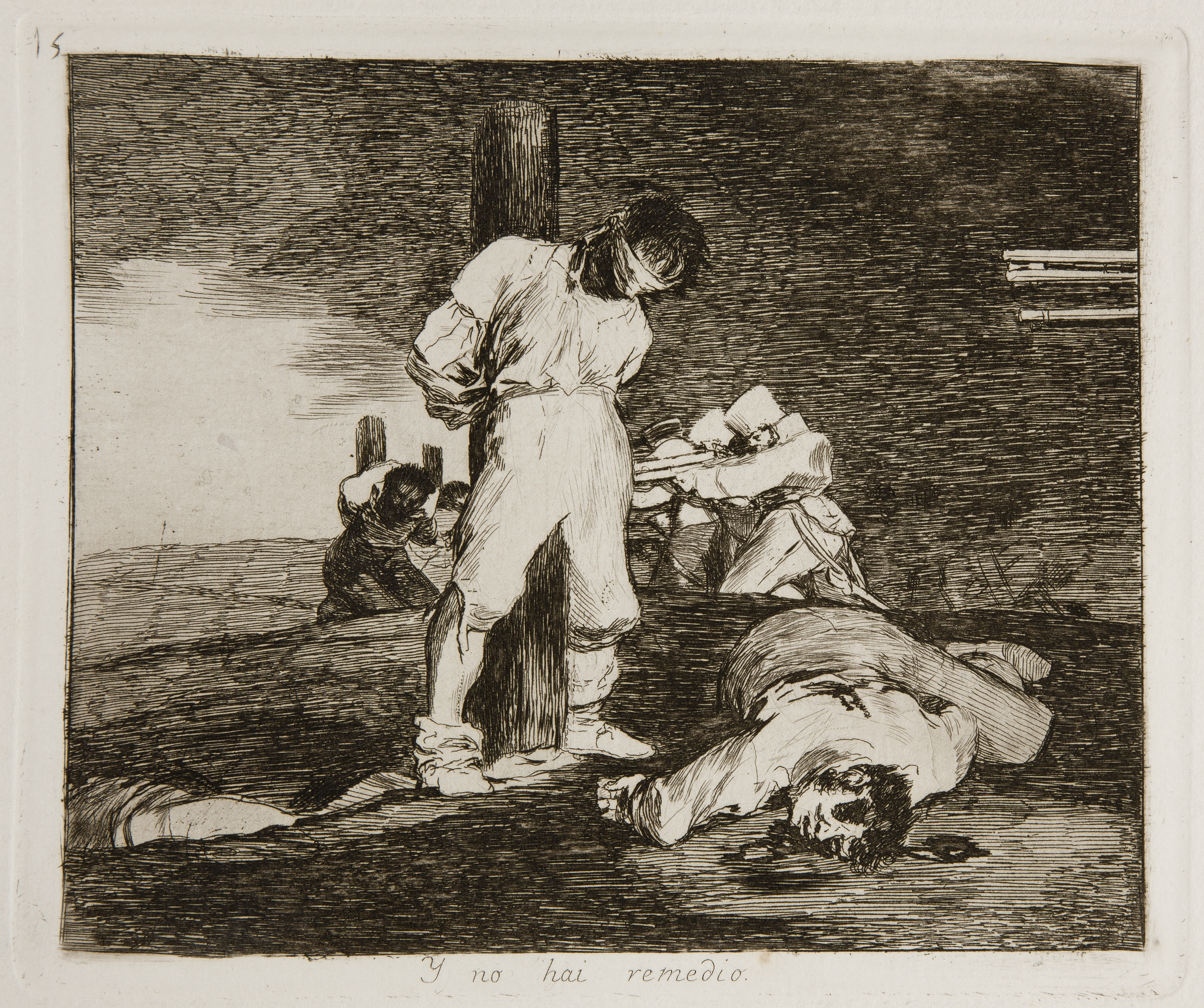
Goya's Y no hay remedio (And there is no remedy) from "The Disasters of War" (Los desastres de la guerra), c. 1810–1812, prefigures elements of The Third of May.

Y no hay remedio (And it cannot be helped) is another of the early prints, from a slightly later group apparently produced at the height of the war when materials were unobtainable, so that Goya had to destroy the plate of an earlier landscape print to make this and another piece in the Disasters series. It shows a shako-wearing firing squad in the background, this time seen receding in a frontal rather than a rear view.

=== Iconography and invention ===
Eugène Delacroix's Liberty Leading the People, 1830. A later example of revolutionary art, which retains the idealized and heroic style of history painting that Goya had dramatically broken with.

At first the painting met with mixed reactions from art critics and historians. Artists had previously tended to depict war in the high style of history painting, and Goya's unheroic description was unusual for the time. According to some early critical opinion the painting was flawed technically: the perspective is flat, or the victims and executioners are standing too close together to be realistic. Although these observations may be strictly correct, Richard Schickel argues that Goya was not striving for academic propriety but rather to strengthen the overall impact of the piece.

The Third of May references a number of earlier works of art, but its power comes from its bluntness rather than its adherence to traditional compositional formulas. Pictorial artifice gives way to the epic portrayal of unvarnished brutality. Even the contemporary Romantic painters—who were also intrigued with subjects of injustice, war, and death—composed their paintings with greater attention to the conventions of beauty, as is evident in later works, such as Théodore Géricault's Raft of the Medusa (1818–1819) and Eugène Delacroix's 1830 painting Liberty Leading the People.

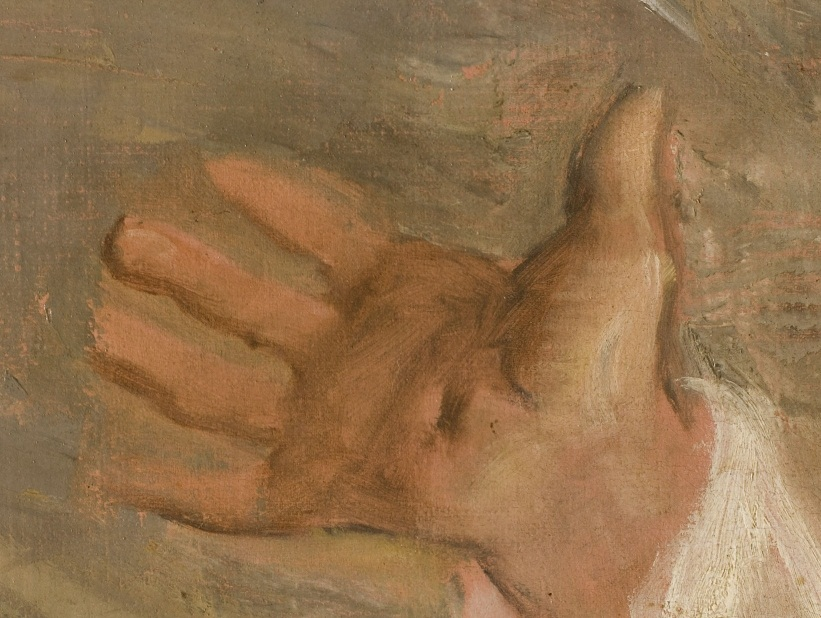
Detail of the victim's right hand which shows a stigma—a wound such as Christ suffered when nailed to the cross

The painting is structurally and thematically tied to traditions of martyrdom in Christian art, as exemplified in the dramatic use of chiaroscuro, and the appeal to life juxtaposed with the inevitability of imminent execution. However, Goya's painting departs from this tradition. Works that depicted violence, such as those by Jusepe de Ribera, feature an artful technique and harmonious composition which anticipate the "crown of martyrdom" for the victim. The man with raised arms at the focal point of the composition has often been compared to a crucified Christ, and a similar pose is sometimes seen in depictions of Christ's nocturnal Agony in the Garden of Gethsemane. Goya's figure displays stigmata-like marks on his right hand, while the lantern at the center of the canvas references a traditional attribute of the Roman soldiers who arrested Christ in the garden. (Note: In depictions since the 12th century, according to Schiller p. 56. Specifically the man who Saint Peter attacks with a sword often had the lantern, which he drops to the ground when attacked. The scenes of the Agony in the Garden of Gethsemane and the Arrest of Christ were central in the development of the depiction of nocturnal scenes in art.) Not only is he posed as if in crucifixion, he wears yellow and white: the heraldic colors of the papacy.

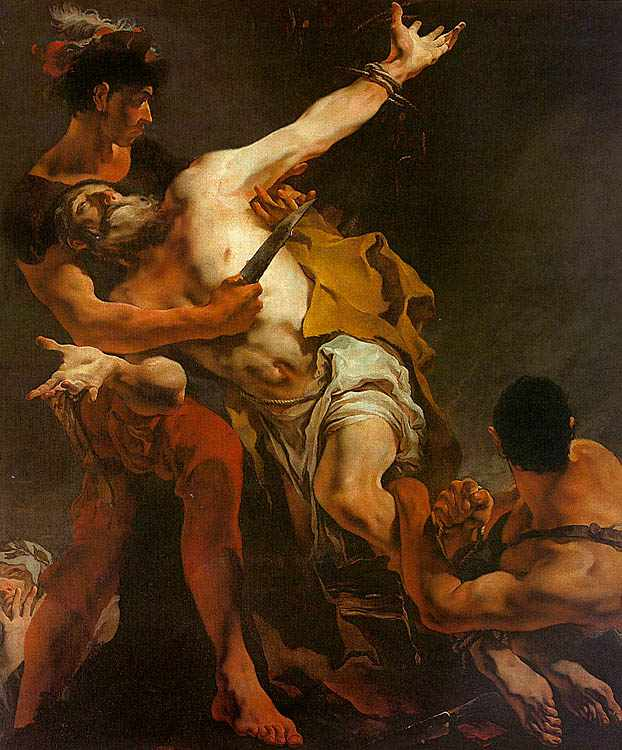
Giovanni Battista Tiepolo's 1722 St. Bartholomew is a traditional scene of martyrdom, with the saint beseeching God. Goya drew inspiration from the iconography of such violent scenes.

The lantern as a source of illumination in art was widely used by Baroque artists, and perfected by Caravaggio. Traditionally a dramatic light source and the resultant chiaroscuro were used as metaphors for the presence of God. Illumination by torch or candlelight took on religious connotations; but in The Third of May the lantern manifests no such miracle. Rather, it affords light only so that the firing squad may complete its grim work, and provides a stark illumination so that the viewer may bear witness to wanton violence. The traditional role of light in art as a conduit for the spiritual has been subverted.

The victim is as anonymous as his killers. His entreaty is addressed not to God in the manner of traditional painting, but to an unheeding and impersonal firing squad. He is not granted the heroism of individuality, but is merely part of a continuum of victims. Beneath him lies a bloody and disfigured corpse; behind and around him are others who will soon share the same fate. Here, for the first time, according to biographer Fred Licht, nobility in individual martyrdom is replaced by futility and irrelevance, the victimization of mass murder, and anonymity as a hallmark of the modern condition.

The way the painting shows the progress of time is also without precedent in Western art. The death of a blameless victim had typically been presented as a conclusive episode, imbued with the virtue of heroism. The Third of May offers no such cathartic message. Instead, there is a continuous procession of the condemned in a mechanical formalization of murder. The inevitable outcome is seen in the corpse of a man, splayed on the ground in the lower left portion of the work. There is no room left for the sublime; his head and body have been disfigured to a degree that renders resurrection impossible. The victim is portrayed bereft of all aesthetic or spiritual grace. For the rest of the picture the viewer's eye level is mostly along the central horizontal axis; only here is the perspectival point of view changed, so that the viewer looks down on the mutilated body.

Finally, there is no attempt by the artist to soften the subject's brutality through technical skill. Method and subject are indivisible. Goya's procedure is determined less by the mandates of traditional virtuosity than by his intrinsically morbid theme. The brushwork could not be described as pleasing, and the colors are restricted to earth tones and black, punctuated by bright flashes of white and the red blood of the victims. The quality of the pigment itself foreshadows Goya's later works: a granular solution producing a matte, sandy finish. Few would admire the work for painterly flourishes, such is its horrific force and its lack of theatricality.

== Provenance ==
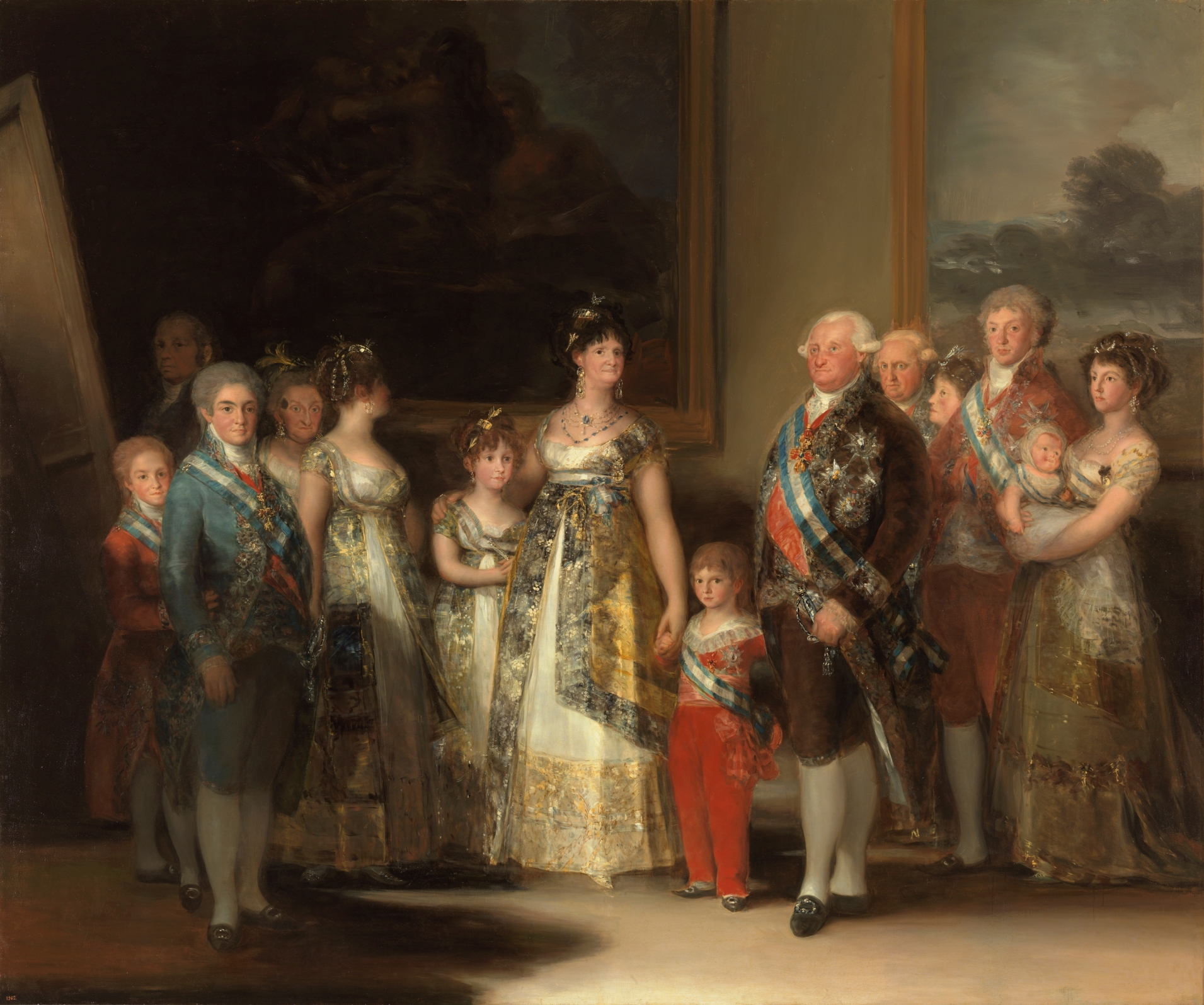
Charles IV of Spain and His Family, 1800–1801. Although Goya had painted many portraits of the House of Bourbon, they did not consider The Third of May 1808 as "suitable subject matter" for the royal collection.

Despite the work's commemorative value, no details about its first exhibition are known, and it is not mentioned in any surviving contemporaneous accounts. This lack of commentary may be due to Fernando VII's preference for neoclassical art, and to the fact that popular revolts of any kind were not regarded as suitable subject matter by the restored Bourbons. A monument to the fallen in the uprising, also commissioned in 1814 by the provisional government, "was stopped by Ferdinand VII, in whose eyes the senators and heroes of the war of independence found small favour, on account of their reforming tendencies".

According to some accounts, the painting lay in storage for thirty to forty years before being shown to the public. Its mention in an 1834 Prado inventory shows that the painting remained in the possession of the government or monarchy; much of the royal collection had been transferred to the museum upon its opening in 1819. Théophile Gautier mentioned seeing "a massacre" by Goya during a visit to the museum in 1845, and a visitor in 1858 noted it as well, though both accounts refer to the work as depicting the events of the second of May, perhaps because Dos de Mayo continues to be the Spanish name for the whole episode. (Note: The phrase in full is El levantamiento del dos de mayo, but this celebrated sequence of events in the nation's history is normally referred to simply as El dos de mayo.)

In 1867, Goya's biographer Charles Emile Yriarte considered the painting important enough to warrant its own special exhibition, but it was not until 1872 that The Third of May was listed in the Prado's published catalog, under the title Scene of the Third of May 1808. Both the Third and Second of May suffered damage in a road accident while being transported by truck to Valencia for safety during the Spanish Civil War, apparently the only time they have left Madrid. Significant paint losses to the left side of the Second of May have been deliberately left unrepaired until the restoration work to both paintings done in 2008 in time for an exhibition marking the bicentennial of the uprising.

In 2009, the Prado selected The Third of May 1808 as one of the museum's fourteen most important paintings, to be displayed in Google Earth at a resolution of 14,000 megapixels.

== Sources ==
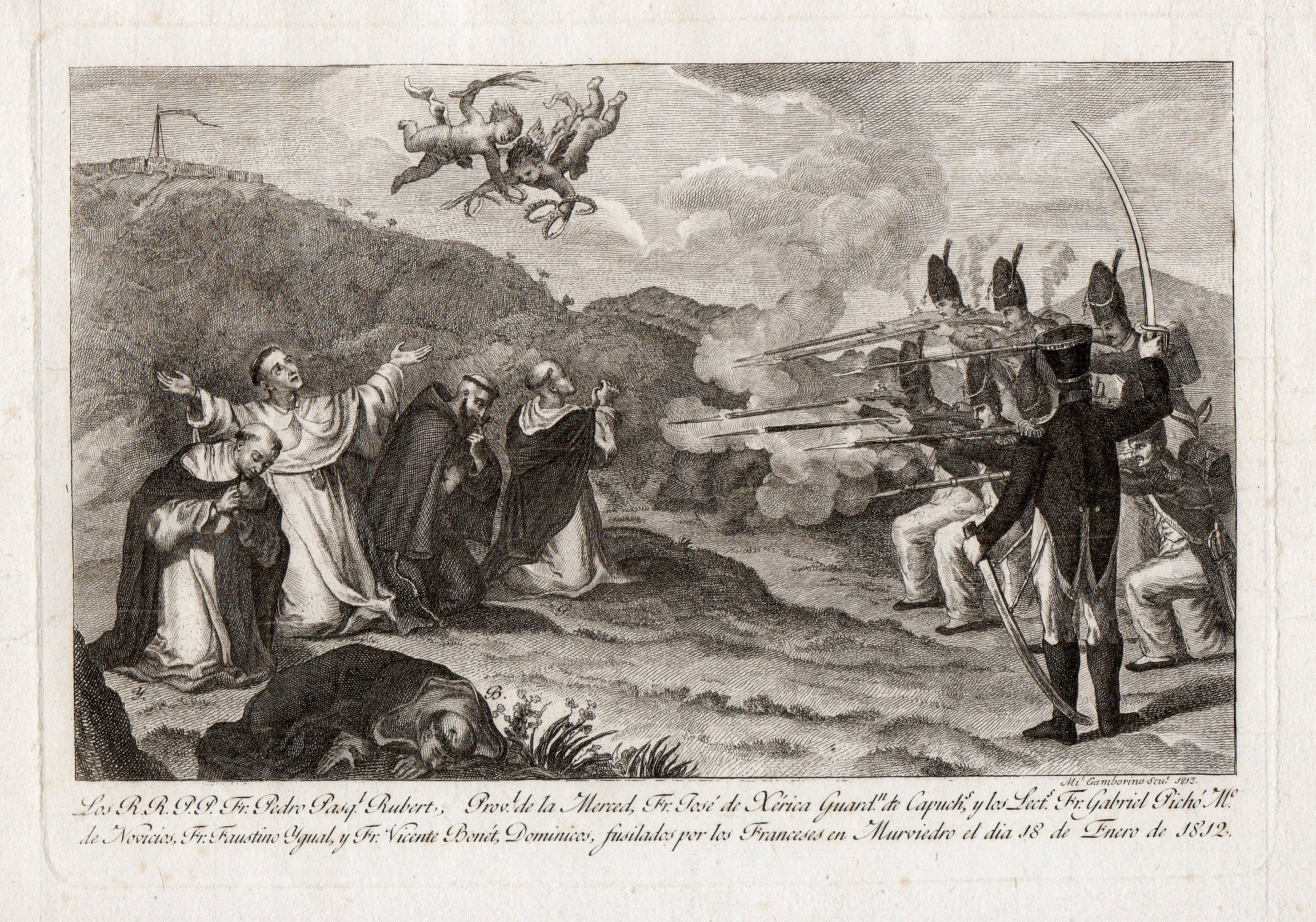
Miguel Gamborino's The Assassination of Five Monks from Valencia

The most likely sources for The Third of May were popular imagery, prints, and broadsides. Depictions of firing squads were common in Spanish political imagery during the Napoleonic War, and Goya's appropriations suggest that he envisaged paintings of heroic scale that would appeal to the general public. Miguel Gamborino's 1813 devotional print The Assassination of Five Monks from Valencia is thought to have served as a source for Goya's composition. Points of similarity include a victim in a posture of crucifixion, whose white garment sets him apart from his companions; a tonsured monk with clenched hands who kneels to his left; and an executed corpse lying in the foreground. The geometry of the composition may be an ironic comment on the French painter Jacques-Louis David's 1784 work Oath of the Horatii. The outstretched arms of David's three Roman Horatii in salute are transmuted into the rifles of the firing squad; the upraised arms of the Horatii's father become the victim's gesture as he faces his executioners. While David painted his figures' expressions with a neoclassical luster, Goya's reply is fashioned from brutal realism. Goya may also have been responding to a painting by Antoine-Jean Gros; the French occupation of Madrid is the subject of Gros's Capitulation of Madrid, The Fourth of December 1808.

== Legacy ==
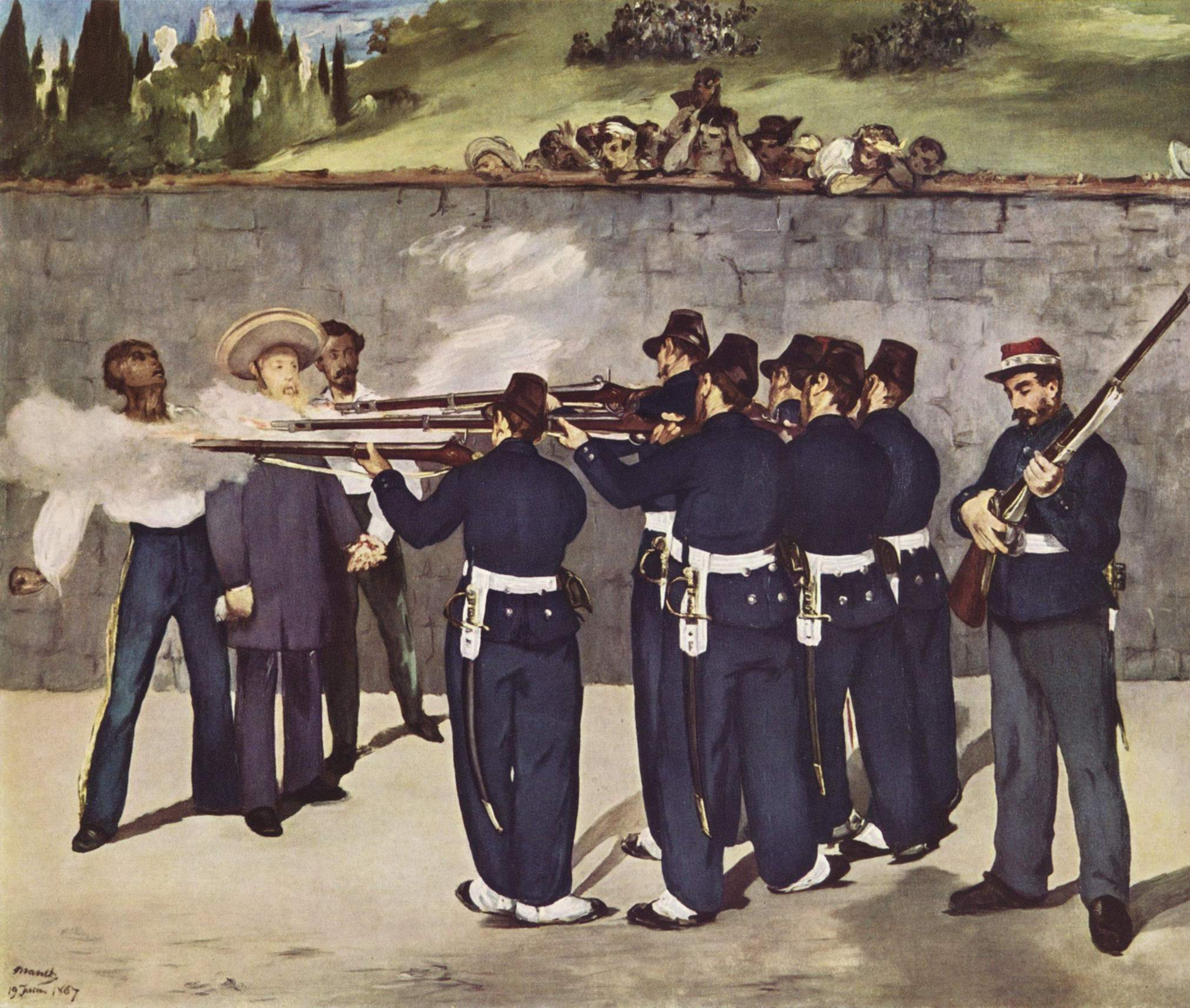
Édouard Manet's Execution of Emperor Maximilian (1868–1869), is one of five versions of his representation of the execution of the Austrian-born Emperor of Mexico, which took place on June 19, 1867. Manet borrowed heavily, thematically and technically, from Goya's The Third of May 1808.

The first paraphrasing of The Third of May was Édouard Manet's Execution of Emperor Maximilian, painted in several versions between 1867 and 1869. In recording a current event to which neither he nor the emerging art of photography was witness, Manet was inspired by Goya's precedent and may have seen the work at the Prado in 1865 before beginning his own paintings, which were too sensitive to be exhibited in France in Manet's lifetime. He undoubtedly saw an 1867 print published by an acquaintance. Art critic Arthur Danto compares Goya's work and Manet's:

The Third of May also depicts an execution, an early event in the so-called Peninsular War between France and Spain. Napoleon Bonaparte invaded Spain in 1808, capturing its royal family and replacing them with his brother, Joseph. The French were as unpopular in Spain as they later were in Mexico, and they encountered a fierce insurrection, which ultimately triumphed. The Third of May execution was an indiscriminate killing of civilians by French soldiers in reprisal for a guerrilla attack the previous day. Goya's painting of the massacre, which shows terrified civilians facing a firing squad, was intended to arouse anger and hatred on the part of Spanish viewers. Goya's is a highly romantic picture of a deeply emotional episode.

The Third of May is cited as an influence on Pablo Picasso's 1937 Guernica, which shows the aftermath of the Nazi German bombing of Guernica during the Spanish Civil War. An exhibition in 2006 at the Prado and the Reina Sofía showed The Third of May, Guernica, and the Execution of the Emperor Maximilian in the same room. Also in the room was Picasso's Massacre in Korea, painted in 1951 during the Korean War—an even more direct reference to the composition of The Third of May. The perpetrators in this painting were intended to be the United States Army or their United Nations allies. Norman Rockwell's 1965 painting Murder in Mississippi, depicting the killing of three American civil rights activists, echoes the composition and lighting of Goya's piece.

Aldous Huxley wrote in 1957 that Goya lacked Rubens' ability to fill the canvas with an ordered composition; but he considered The Third of May a success because Goya "is speaking in his native language, and he is therefore able to express what he wants to say with maximum force and clarity". Kenneth Clark remarked on the painting's radical departure from history painting and its intensity: "With Goya we do not think of the studio or even of the artist at work. We think only of the event. Does this imply that The Third of May is a kind of superior journalism, the record of an incident in which depth of focus is sacrificed to an immediate effect? I am ashamed to say that I once thought so; but the longer I look at this ...the more clearly I recognise that I was mistaken."

== See also ==
- List of works by Francisco Goya
