= List of Picasso artworks 1941–1950 =

This is a list of some works by Spanish painter Pablo Picasso, from 1941 on to 1950.

- 1941 Dora Maar au Chat
- 1941 Tete de femme (Dora Maar) (in plaster)
- 1941 Nature Morte
- 1942 Nature morte à la Guitare
- 1942 Bull's Head
- 1943 Buste de femme 43
- 1943 Mujer con sombrero
- 1944 Plant de Tomato
- 1944–45 The Charnel House, oil and charcoal on canvas, Museum of Modern Art, New York City
- 1946 Le Taureau, series of etchings
- 1946 La Joie de Vivre
- 1947 Portrait de femme au chapeau vert
- 1948 Nature Morte au Poron (Still Life with Poron), oil on canvas, Welsh National Museum of Art, Cardiff, Wales.
- 1949 Portrait of Françoise (Buste de Femme), oil on canvas, University of Michigan Museum of Art
- 1949 Dove, lithograph on paper, Tate
- 1950 Portrait of a Painter after El Greco
- 1950 Matador
