= André Fougeron =

French painter

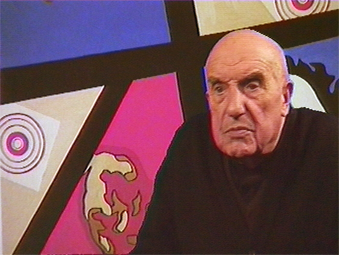
- André Fougeron in 1995
- Born: 1 October 1913; 17th arrondissement of Paris, France
- Died: 10 September 1998 (aged 84); Amboise, France
- Known for: Painting
- Movement: Nouveau réalisme

André Fougeron (1 October 1913 – 10 September 1998) was a French painter. A representative of the Nouveau Réalisme movement, the main subjects of his paintings were the themes of everyday life and social struggle of the French people.

== Biography ==
Fougeron was born into a working-class family and himself was a metal worker. A self-taught painter from a young age, he sent a painting to the Salon des Indépendants in 1928. In the 1930s, alongside artists such as Maurice Estève and Édouard Pignon in particular, fought for the establishment of the unemployment fund for artists and craftsmen and, jointly, with the Union of unemployed committees in the Paris region, for the increase unemployment benefit.

After serving in the military, he returned to Paris and joined Louis Aragon's Maison de la culture movement with his friend Boris Taslitzky. Inspired by Pablo Picasso's Guernica, Fougeron created many paintings depicting the Spanish Civil War and in support of the Republicans. In 1939, Fougeron joined the French Communist Party and remained a member until his death.

Being called for the military again after the German invasion, he was prisoner on the Belgian front but managed to escape and reach the free zone before resettling in Paris, then, in 1943, in Montrouge, where he created a studio. He transformed this workshop into a clandestine printing press. An active resistance fighter in the artistic community, he was secretary general of the National Arts Front, the artistic section of the National Front.

At the Liberation, Fougeron worked the office of Fine Arts until November 1944. He was then one of the favorite artists of the Communist Party. He was recognized by the party as one of the "leaders of the new realism" with other artists such as Taslitzky. He exhibited in numerous events organized by the Communist Party from 1948 to 1954.

As the PCF started to change its cultural policy from the late 1950s and distance itself from workerism, Fougeron's popularity and influence dwindled. Fougeron moved towards a more critical figurative style and mixed influences, borrowing from photography, hyperrealism and comics, without abandoning his political commitment and depictions of current events.
