= Pierre Daix =

French journalist and writer

Pierre Georges Daix
- Born: 24 May 1922; Ivry-sur-Seine, Paris, France
- Died: 2 November 2014 (aged 92); 14th arrondissement of Paris, France
- Resting place: Ivry Cemetery, Ivry-sur-Seine

Pierre Georges Daix (24 May 1922 – 2 November 2014) was a French journalist, writer and art historian. He was a friend and biographer of Pablo Picasso.

As a young man, Daix was an ardent Stalinist. He joined the French Communist Party at the age of 17 in 1939 when the Communist Party was banned for supporting the German-Soviet pact. In July 1940, he created a student club, the Centre laïque des auberges de la jeunesse (Claj), which served as a legal screen for the clandestine Union of Communist Students.

When David Rousset (1912–1997) spoke out about Stalin's vast system of prison camps, Daix attacked him as a liar, denying that the GULAG system existed in the Soviet Union, in a 16-page article in Les Lettres Françaises, entitled "Pourquoi M. David Rousset a-t-il inventé les camps soviétiques?" ("Why Did Mr. David Rousset Invent the Soviet Camps?"). Rousset brought libel charges against Daix and there was a public trial in France, which Rousset, who had told the truth about the camps, won in 1950. As a French communist, Daix continued his uncritical support for the Soviet Union for many years, though late in life he admitted he had been wrong.

From 1980 to 1985, he was a journalist for Le Quotidien de Paris.
