= Dove (Picasso) =

1949 lithograph by Pablo Picasso

- Artist: Pablo Picasso
- Year: 1949
- Medium: Lithograph
- Dimensions: 56.7 cm × 76 cm (22.3 in × 30 in)

Dove (French: La Colombe) is a 1949 lithograph on paper created by Pablo Picasso in 1949 in an edition of 50+5. The lithograph displays a white dove on a black background, which is widely considered to be a symbol of peace. The image was used to illustrate a poster at the 1949 Paris Peace Congress and also became an iconographic image of the period, known as "The dove of peace". An example is housed in the collection of the Tate Gallery and MOMA. Since then, it has been considered a masterpiece.

== Background ==
Until the Spanish Civil War, Picasso had been predominantly apolitical. His art dealer Daniel-Henry Kahnweiler stated that he had been the "most apolitical man" he had ever known. However, the Spanish Civil War had a profound effect on Picasso's outlook, causing him to become more concerned with politics, which eventually led to his painting of Guernica in 1937. After painting this masterpiece, Picasso became a symbol of anti-fascism. By the end of World War II, Picasso had joined the Communist Party, motivated by humanitarian concerns. For Picasso, Communism offered a different path that rejected the fascism of the Second World War and the Spanish Civil War. However, this affiliation caused a certain amount of controversy. Between 1948 and 1951, he attended several World Peace Congresses. When Picasso was asked to speak at the 1950 Peace Congress in Sheffield, he said, "I stand for life against death; I stand for peace against war."

== Description ==
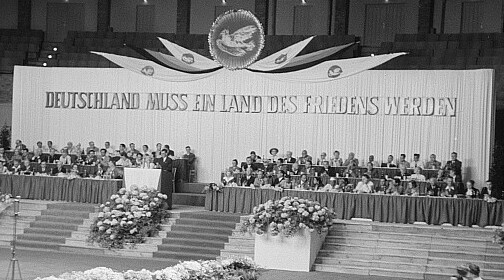
A World Peace Council Congress in East Berlin on 1 July 1952 showing Picasso's dove above the stage, banner reading "Germany must become a land of peace"

On 9 January 1949, Picasso created Dove, a black and white lithograph, which he produced in the studio of the printmaker, Fernand Mourlot in Paris. It was published by Galerie Louise Leiris in an edition of five artist’s proofs and fifty prints on white Arches wove paper. The image of the white dove is simple, yet striking, and was created using lithographic ink wash.

The printmaker, Fernand Mourlot, described the work as, "one of the most beautiful lithographs ever achieved; the soft tones attained in the feathers... are absolutely remarkable. This plate... conveys the maximum that can be obtained with lithographic ink used as wash."

The dove illustrated in the lithograph was actually a Milanese pigeon, which had been a gift to Picasso from his friend and fellow artist, Henri Matisse.

Picasso's Dove lithograph was used to illustrate the poster of the 1949 Paris Peace Congress. It was chosen by the poet Louis Aragon, a supporter of the French Communist Party, who visited Picasso’s studio. Dove became a symbol of peace and also of world Communism. The day before the opening of the Peace Congress on 20 April 1949, Picasso’s partner, Françoise Gilot gave birth to his fourth child, who was named Paloma, the Spanish word for dove.

== Significance and legacy ==
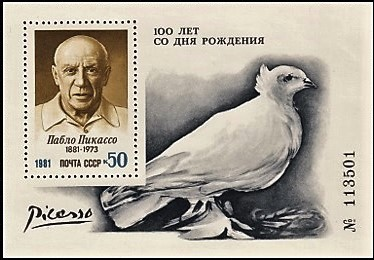
Picasso's lithograph on a Soviet stamp from 1981

Picasso's images of the dove became a phenomenon around the world. Between 1949 and the artist's death, he created numerous works, including posters, prints and drawings, which depicted the Dove of Peace. Variations of the image were used for Peace Congresses in Wroclaw, Stockholm, Sheffield, Vienna, Rome and Moscow. Images were distributed around the world by the Peace Movement, creating new momentum for the artist's reputation. When the armistice that ended the Korean War was signed in what is now the North Korea Peace Museum, a copy of the image was hanging in the building and was covered up upon request from the UNC commander.

For Picasso, the dove was both an important political symbol and a personal one. It was a reminder of his father, José Ruiz y Blasco, who was also a painter and had taught Picasso his early skills as an artist. He had drawn doves in Picasso's childhood home in Málaga in the 1880s. Later in life, when Picasso moved to Cannes in the South of France in 1955, he built a dovecote, allowing him to observe and depict the resident doves. In 1957, Picasso painted Studio (Pigeons. Velazquez), depicting an open window surrounded by doves. This was one of several paintings he created in the style of Matisse, as a homage to his friend and his doves.

Christoph Grunenberg, Director of Tate Liverpool, said of an exhibition of Picasso's work in 2010, "This shows a very different Picasso, Picasso as a peace campaigner, Picasso as a Communist Party member, someone who was truly committed to bringing East and West during the Cold War together."

== See also ==
- Child With a Dove
- Dora Maar au Chat
- Guernica
- List of Picasso artworks 1941–1950
