= Guernica (Picasso) =

1937 anti-war painting by Pablo Picasso

- Artist: Pablo Picasso
- Year: 1937
- Medium: Oil on canvas
- Movement: Cubism
- Dimensions: 349.3 cm × 776.5 cm (137.4 in × 305.5 in)
- Location: Museo Reina Sofía, Madrid

Guernica is a large 1937 oil painting by Spanish artist Pablo Picasso. It is one of his best-known works, regarded by many art critics as the most moving and powerful anti-war painting in history. It is exhibited in the Museo Reina Sofía in Madrid.

The grey, black, and white painting, done on a canvas 3.49 meters (11 ft 5 in) tall and 7.76 meters (25 ft 6 in) across, portrays the suffering wrought by violence and chaos. Prominently featured in the composition are grieving and screaming women, a gored screaming horse, a wide-eyed bull, a dead dove, a dead baby, a dismembered soldier, and flames.

Picasso painted Guernica at his home in Paris in response to the 26 April 1937 bombing of Guernica, a town in the Basque Country in northern Spain, by Nazi Germany's Condor Legion and the fascist government of Italy. Upon completion, Guernica was exhibited at the Spanish pavilion in the 1937 Paris International Exposition and then at other venues around the world. The touring exhibition was used to raise funds for Spanish war relief. The painting soon became widely acclaimed, helping to bring worldwide attention to the Spanish Civil War that took place from 1936 to 1939.

== Commission ==
In January 1937, while Pablo Picasso was living in Paris on Rue des Grands Augustins, he was commissioned by the Spanish Republican government to create a large artwork for the Spanish pavilion at the Exposition Internationale des Arts et Techniques dans la Vie Moderne, a 1937 Paris International Exposition. Picasso, who had last visited Spain in 1934 and would never return, was the Honorary Director-in-Exile of the Prado Museum.

Picasso worked somewhat dispassionately from January until late April on the project's initial sketches, which depicted his perennial theme of an artist's studio. Then, immediately upon hearing reports of the 26 April bombing of Guernica, poet Juan Larrea visited Picasso's home to urge him to make the bombing his subject. Days later, on 1 May, Picasso read George Steer's eyewitness account of the attack, which originally had been published in both The Times and The New York Times on 28 April, and abandoned his initial idea. Acting on Larrea's suggestion, Picasso began sketching a series of preliminary drawings for Guernica.

== Historical context ==
=== Bombing of 26 April 1937 ===
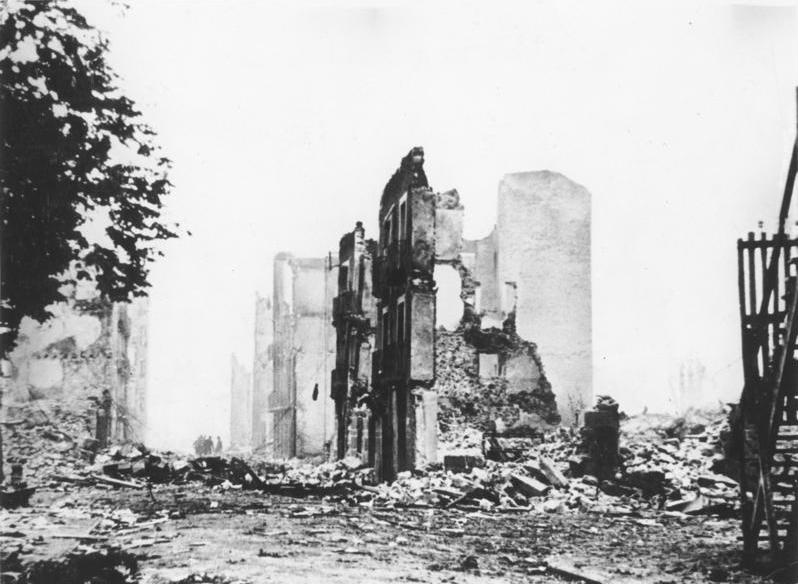
Guernica in ruins, 1937

On 26 April 1937, during the Spanish Civil War, the town of Guernica was razed to the ground by German aircraft belonging to the Condor Legion, sent by Adolf Hitler to support General Francisco Franco's troops. Bombs rained down on Guernica for hours in an "experiment" for the Blitzkrieg tactics and bombing of civilians seen in later wars.

During the civil war the Republican forces, made up of communists, socialists, anarchists, and others with differing goals, united in their opposition to the Nationalists, led by Franco, who wanted to establish a fascist dictatorship. The Nationalists perceived Guernica, a quiet Basque Country village in the province of Biscay, as the northern bastion of the Republican resistance movement and the center of Basque culture.

On Monday, 26 April 1937, Nazi Germany's warplanes, commanded by Colonel Wolfram von Richthofen, bombed Guernica for about two hours. In his 26 April 1937 diary entry, Richthofen states that the town was targeted "...to halt and disrupt the Red withdrawal which has to pass through here." The following day, he wrote in his diary, "Guernica burning". In Richthofen's 30 April 1937 journal entry, he noted that when the squadron arrived "there was smoke everywhere" from the attack by three aircraft, and since nobody could see the roads, bridges, and suburbs "they just dropped everything right into the center. The 250s toppled a number of houses and destroyed the water mains. The incendiaries now could spread and become effective. The materials of the houses: tile roofs, wooden porches, and half-timbering resulted in complete annihilation."

Since Monday was Guernica's market day, and most of its men were away fighting on behalf of the Republicans, at the time of the bombing the town was populated mostly by women and children, and many of them congregated in the center of town. When the main bombardment began the roads were already full of debris and the bridges leading out of town were destroyed. The residents were unable to escape.

Guernica was 10 kilometres (6.2 mi) from the front lines, and in-between the front lines and Bilbao. A Republican retreat towards Bilbao, or an advance towards it, had to pass through Guernica. The nearest military target, a war product factory on the town's outskirts, went through the attack unscathed, so the attack was widely condemned as a terror bombing.

=== Aftermath ===
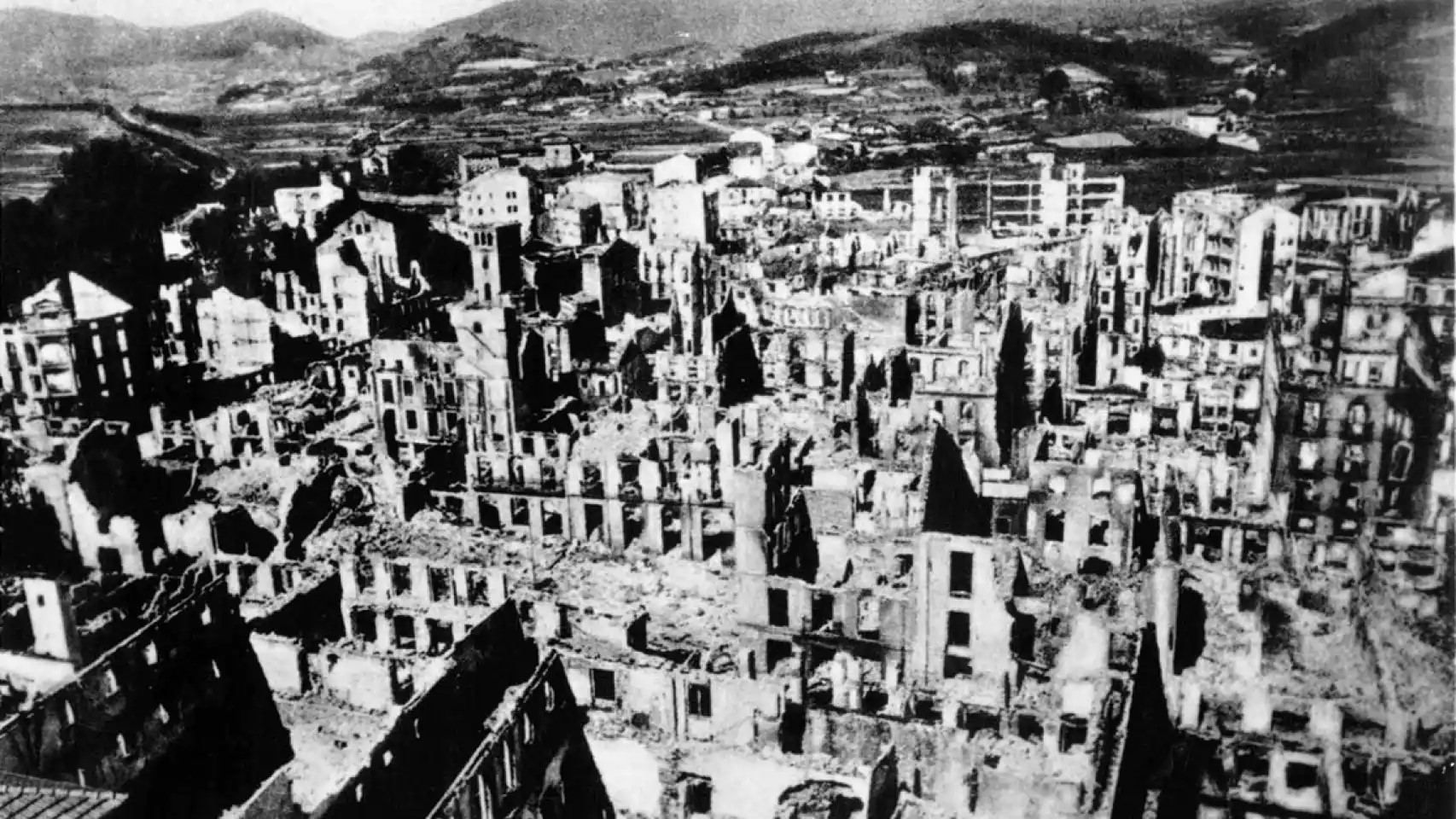
Damage sustained during the air attack

The Times journalist George Steer propelled this event onto the international scene, and brought it to Pablo Picasso's attention, in an eyewitness account published on 28 April in both The Times and The New York Times. On the 29th it appeared in L'Humanité. Steer wrote:

Guernica, the most ancient town of the Basques and the centre of their cultural tradition, was completely destroyed yesterday afternoon by insurgent air raiders. The bombardment of this open town far behind the lines occupied precisely three hours and a quarter, during which a powerful fleet of aeroplanes consisting of three types of German types, Junkers and Heinkel bombers, did not cease unloading on the town bombs weighing from 1,000 lbs. downwards and, it is calculated, more than 3,000 two-pounder aluminium incendiary projectiles. The fighters, meanwhile, plunged low from above the centre of the town to machinegun those of the civilian population who had taken refuge in the fields."

Picasso lived in Paris during its World War II German occupation. A widely repeated story is that a German officer saw a photo of Guernica in Picasso's apartment and asked, "Did you do that?", and Picasso responded, "No, you did."

Referring to Picasso's painting, art theorist Rudolf Arnheim writes:

The women and children make Guernica the image of innocent, defenseless humanity victimized. Also, women and children have often been presented by Picasso as the very perfection of mankind. An assault on women and children is, in Picasso's view, directed at the core of mankind.

== Creation, and the influence of Dora Maar on the painting ==
On 11 May the canvas is ready, and immediately the composition is laid down as a linear structure that covers the whole surface. Work on the mural is accompanied by more than thirty studies for the details. The rough plan exists from the beginning, but it takes three weeks before the picture receives its final form. The bull's head remains where it was first put, but the body is turned around to the left. On 20 May the horse lifts its head. The body of the soldier stretched on the floor from left to right changes position on 4 June, then head and hand take on their finished shape.

At the last moment the artist makes one decisive adjustment: the drama first took place on a street with burning houses in the background. Now, suddenly, the diagonals are accentuated, and thereby space becomes ambiguous, unreal, inside and outside at the same time. The lamp is hung over the horse's head, looking on the dreadful scene like a wide-open eye. The construction is strengthened, the mural more strongly integrated within Sert's architecture. Into the hand of the dying soldier, next to the broken sword, Picasso puts the little flower of hope.

The picture was finished about mid-June. Hundreds of thousands of exhibition-goers wandered by, looking on it as a wall decoration, just as Europe wandered by the human drama of the Spanish Civil War—as if it were a matter concerning only the inhabitants of the peninsula. They disregarded the warning, did not understand that democracy on the whole continent was at stake.

— W. J. H. B. Sandberg, Daedalus, 1960

Dora Maar found a large enough studio for Picasso to paint Guernica in. Through her connections in the left-wing community, she gained access to a space on Rue des Grands-Augustins, near Notre-Dame. This building had previously served as the headquarters of the ‘Contre-Attaque’ group, of which Maar was a dedicated member. Having listened to anti-fascist speeches there, she recognized it as the ideal location for Picasso's monumental protest artwork. Not only did she find the studio large enough for Picasso to paint Guernica in, she also had exclusive access to photograph the work in progress.

“Maar’s practice of photography influenced the art of Picasso – she had a great influence on his work,” said Antoine Romand, a Dora Maar expert. “She contested him. She pushed him to do something new and to be more creative politically. Some argue that Picasso borrowed from Maar's photographic oeuvre by painting Guernica in stark black and white, which was a departure from his usual colorful style. At Picasso’s request, Maar painted part of the dying horse in Guernica. Maar accompanied Picasso in the studio, giving her the opportunity to observe each phase of Guernica’s creation over 36 days. While Picasso painted, she took photographs, turning Picasso into her photographic subject.

== Painting process ==
Guernica was painted using a matte house paint specially formulated at Picasso's request to have the least possible gloss. American artist John Ferren assisted him in preparing the monumental canvas, and photographer Dora Maar, who had been working with Picasso since mid-1936 photographing his studio and teaching him the technique of cameraless photography, documented its creation. Apart from their documentary and publicity value, Maar's photographs "helped Picasso to eschew color and give the work the black-and-white immediacy of a photograph", according to art historian John Richardson.

Picasso, who rarely allowed strangers into his studio to watch him work, admitted influential visitors to observe his progress on Guernica, believing that the publicity would help the antifascist cause. As his work on the mural progressed, Picasso explained: "The Spanish struggle is the fight of reaction against the people, against freedom. My whole life as an artist has been nothing more than a continuous struggle against reaction and the death of art. How could anybody think for a moment that I could be in agreement with reaction and death? ... In the panel on which I am working, which I shall call Guernica, and in all my recent works of art, I clearly express my abhorrence of the military caste which has sunk Spain in an ocean of pain and death."

Picasso worked on the painting for 35 days, and finished it on 4 June 1937.

== Composition ==

The scene occurs within a large room. On the left, a wide-eyed bull, with a tail suggesting rising flame and smoke as if seen through a window, stands over a grieving woman holding a dead child in her arms. The woman's head is thrown back and her mouth is wide open. A horse falls in agony in the center of the room, with a large gaping hole in its side, as if it had just been run through by a spear or javelin. The horse appears to be wearing chain mail armor, decorated with vertical tally marks arranged in rows.

A dead and dismembered soldier lies under the horse. The hand of his severed right arm grasps a shattered sword, from which a flower grows. The open palm of his left hand contains a stigma, a symbol of martyrdom derived from the stigmata of Christ. A bare light bulb in the shape of an all-seeing eye blazes over the suffering horse's head.

To the horse's upper right a frightened woman's head and extended right arm reach through a window. As she witnesses the scene she carries a flame-lit lamp in her right hand, and holds it near the bare bulb. Below her a woman in shock staggers from the right towards the center while looking into the blazing light bulb with a blank stare.

Daggers that suggest screaming have replaced the tongues of the horse, the bull, and the grieving woman. To the bull's right a dove appears on a cracked wall through which bright light from the outside shines.

On the far right of the room there is a fourth woman, her arms raised in terror. Her wide-open mouth and thrown back head echo the grieving woman's. She is entrapped by fire from above and below, her right hand suggesting the shape of an airplane.

A dark wall with an open door defines the right side of the room.

A "hidden" image formed by the horse appears in Guernica: the horse's nostrils and upper teeth can be seen as a human skull facing left and slightly downward.

Another hidden image is of a bull that appears to gore the horse from underneath. The bull's head is formed mainly by the horse's entire front leg which has the knee on the ground. The leg's knee-cap forms the head's nose. A horn appears within the horse's breast.

== Symbolism and interpretations ==
Interpretations of Guernica vary widely and contradict one another. This extends, for example, to the mural's two dominant elements: the bull and the horse. Art historian Patricia Failing said,

"The bull and the horse are important characters in Spanish culture. Picasso himself certainly used these characters to play many different roles over time. This has made the task of interpreting the specific meaning of the bull and the horse very tough. Their relationship is a kind of ballet that was conceived in a variety of ways throughout Picasso's career."

When pressed to explain the elements in Guernica, Picasso said,

...this bull is a bull and this horse is a horse... If you give a meaning to certain things in my paintings it may be very true, but it is not my idea to give this meaning. What ideas and conclusions you have got I obtained too, but instinctively, unconsciously. I make the painting for the painting. I paint the objects for what they are.

In The Dream and Lie of Franco, a series of narrative sketches Picasso also created for the World's Fair, Franco is depicted as a monster that first devours his own horse and later does battle with an angry bull. Work on these illustrations began before the bombing of Guernica, and four additional panels were added, three of which relate directly to the Guernica mural.

According to scholar Beverly Ray, the following list of interpretations reflects the general consensus of historians: "The shape and posture of the bodies express protest"; "Picasso uses black, white, and grey paint to set a somber mood and express pain and chaos"; "flaming buildings and crumbling walls not only express the destruction of Guernica, but reflect the destructive power of civil war"; "the newspaper print used in the painting reflects how Picasso learned of the massacre"; "The light bulb in the painting represents the sun"; and "The broken sword near the bottom of the painting symbolizes the defeat of the people at the hand of their tormentors".

Alejandro Escalona said, "The chaos unfolding seems to happen in closed quarters provoking an intense feeling of oppression. There is no way out of the nightmarish cityscape. The absence of color makes the violent scene developing right before your eyes even more horrifying. The blacks, whites, and grays startle you—especially because you are used to see war images broadcast live and in high-definition right to your living room."

In drawing attention to a number of preliminary studies, the so-called primary project, that show an atelier installation incorporating the central triangular shape which reappears in the final version of Guernica, Becht-Jördens and Wehmeier interpret the painting as a self-referential composition in the tradition of atelier paintings such as Las Meninas by Diego Velázquez. In his chef d'oeuvre, Picasso seems to be trying to define his role and his power as an artist in the face of political power and violence. But far from being a mere political painting, Guernica should be seen as Picasso's comment on what art can actually contribute towards the self-assertion that liberates every human being and protects the individual against overwhelming forces such as political crime, war, violence and death.

== Exhibition ==
=== 1937 Paris International Exhibition ===
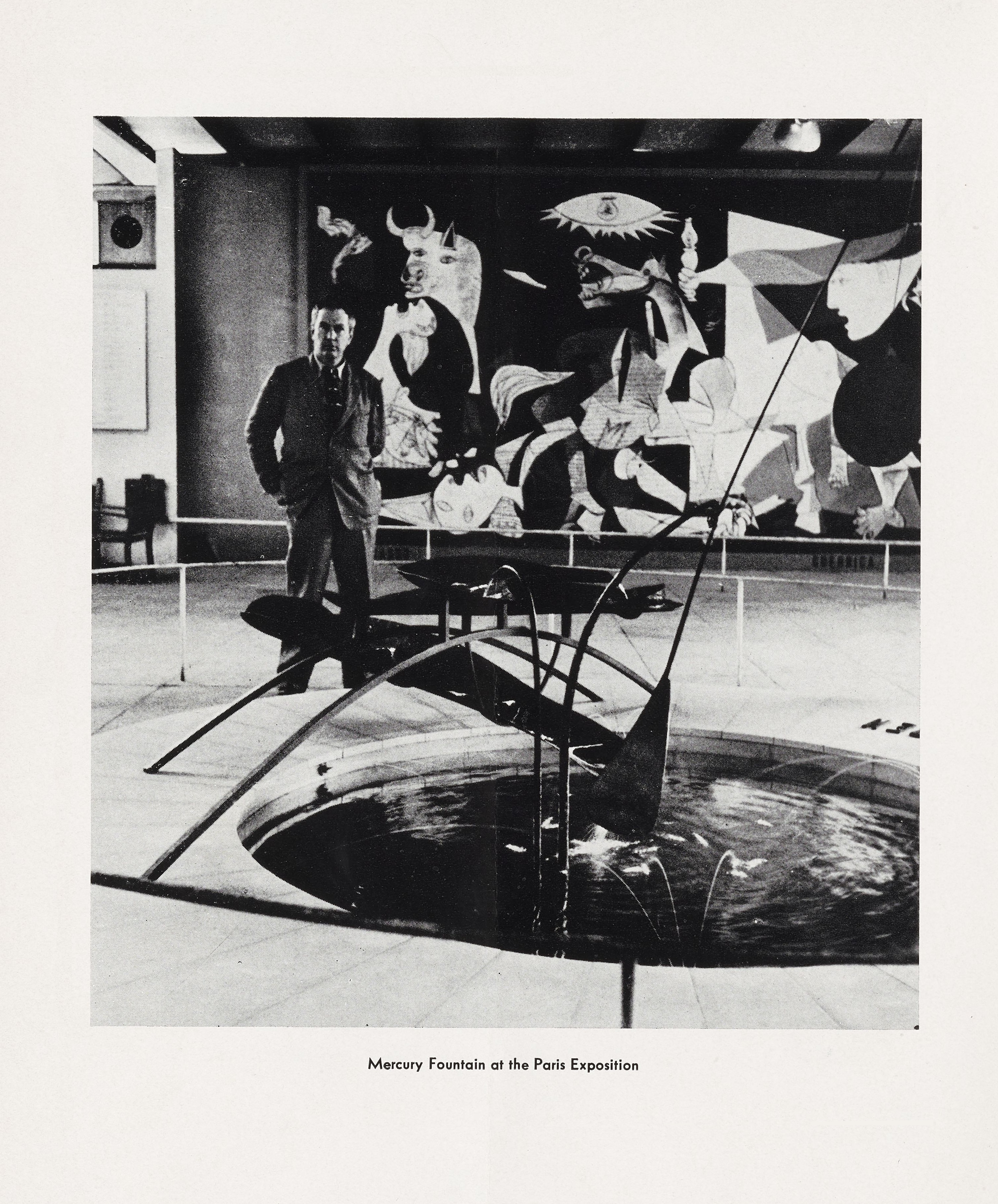
Guernica at the 1937 exhibition, with sculptor Alexander Calder and his Mercury Fountain

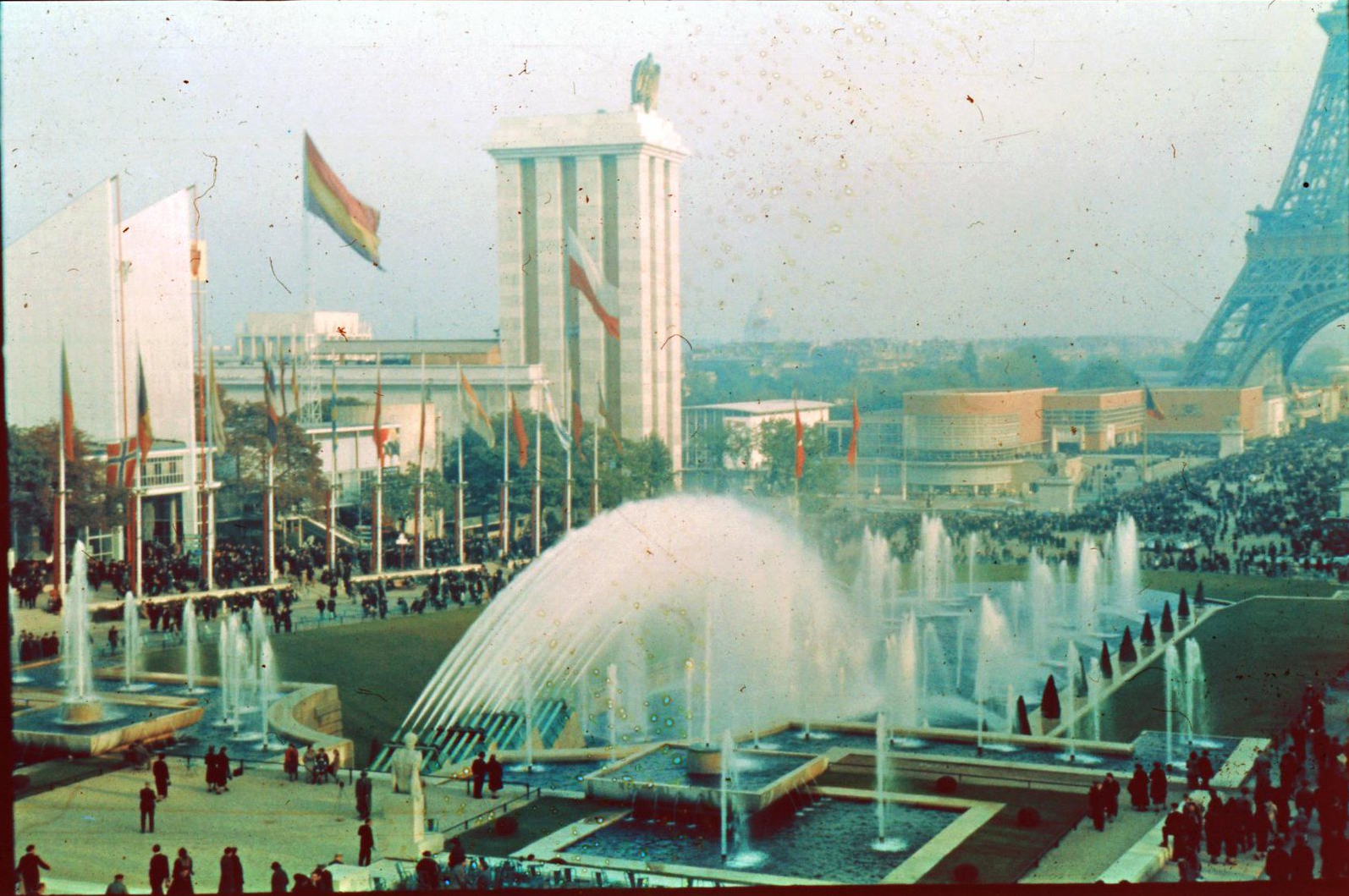
The large flag of the Second Spanish Republic, with horizontal bars of red, yellow, and purple, marking the place of exhibition of Picasso's painting Guernica in Paris during the World Expo in 1937 (Agfacolor)

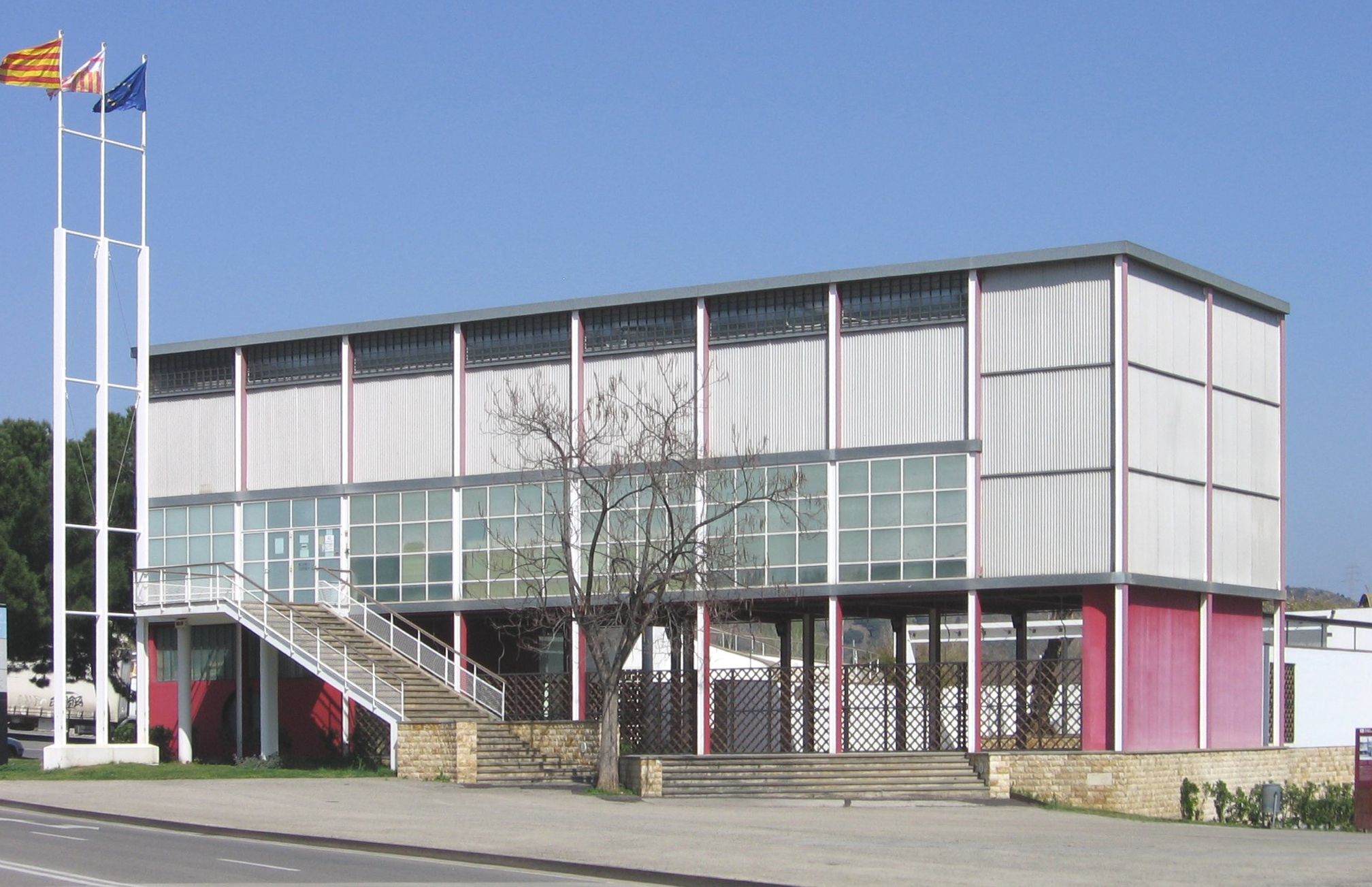
A replica (built in Barcelona in 1992) of the pavilion of the Spanish Republic at the 1937 Paris International Exhibition

Guernica was unveiled and initially exhibited in July 1937 at the Spanish Pavilion at the Paris International Exposition, where Nazi Germany and the Soviet Union had huge pavilions. The Pavilion, which was financed by the Spanish Republican government at the time of civil war, was built to exhibit the Spanish government's struggle for existence contrary to the Exposition's technology theme. The Pavilion's entrance presented an enormous photographic mural of Republican soldiers accompanied by the slogan:

We are fighting for the essential unity of Spain.
We are fighting for the integrity of Spanish soil.
We are fighting for the independence of our country and for the right of the Spanish people to determine their own destiny.

The display of Guernica was accompanied by the poem "The Victory of Guernica" by Paul Éluard, and the pavilion displayed The Reaper by Joan Miró and Mercury Fountain by Alexander Calder, both of whom were sympathetic to the Republican cause.

At Guernica's Paris Exhibition unveiling it garnered little attention. The public's reaction to the painting was mixed. Max Aub, one of the officials in charge of the Spanish pavilion, was compelled to defend the work against a group of Spanish officials who objected to the mural's modernist style and sought to replace it with a more traditional painting that was also commissioned for the exhibition, Madrid 1937 (Black Aeroplanes) by Horacio Ferrer de Morgado. Some Marxist groups criticized Picasso's painting as lacking in political commitment, and faulted it for not offering a vision of a better future. In contrast, Morgado's painting was a great success with Spanish Communists and with the public. The art critic Clement Greenberg was also critical of Guernica, and in a later essay he termed the painting "jerky" and "too compressed for its size", and compared it unfavorably to the "magnificently lyrical" The Charnel House (1944–1948), a later antiwar painting by Picasso.

Among the painting's admirers were art critic Jean Cassou and poet José Bergamín, both of whom praised the painting as quintessentially Spanish. Michel Leiris perceived in Guernica a foreshadowing: "On a black and white canvas that depicts ancient tragedy ... Picasso also writes our letter of doom: all that we love is going to be lost..." Jean Cocteau also praised the painting and declared it a cross that "[General] Franco would always carry on his shoulder."

Possibly as a riposte to Picasso's painting, the Nazis in June or July 1937 commissioned their official war artist Claus Bergen to produce a patriotic painting of The Bombardment of Almeria by the 'Admiral Scheer' (National Maritime Museum, London). The work, done in a realistic style, was completed quickly for display in the Great German Art Exhibition in Munich, 1937.

=== European tour ===
Guernica, for which Picasso was paid 150,000 francs for his costs by the Spanish Republican government, was one of the few major paintings that Picasso did not sell directly to his exclusive contracted art dealer and friend, Paul Rosenberg. However, after its exhibition Rosenberg organised a four-man extravaganza Scandinavian tour of 118 works by Picasso, Matisse, Braque, and Henri Laurens.

From January to April 1938 the tour visited Oslo, Copenhagen, Stockholm, and Gothenburg. Starting in late September Guernica was exhibited in London's Whitechapel Art Gallery. This stop was organized by Sir Roland Penrose with Labour Party leader Clement Attlee, and the painting arrived in London on 30 September, the same day the Munich Agreement was signed by the leaders of the United Kingdom, France, Italy, and Germany. It then travelled to Leeds, Liverpool, and, in early 1939, Manchester. There, Manchester Foodship For Spain, a group of artists and activists engaged in sending aid to the people of Spain, exhibited the painting in the HE Nunn & Co Ford automobile showroom for two weeks. Guernica then returned briefly to France.

=== American tour ===
After Francisco Franco's victory in Spain, Guernica was sent to the United States to raise funds and support for Spanish refugees. It was first shown at the Valentine Gallery in New York City in May 1939. The San Francisco Museum of Art (later renamed the San Francisco Museum of Modern Art) gave the work its first museum appearance in the United States from 27 August to 19 September 1939. New York's Museum of Modern Art (MoMA) then mounted an exhibition from 15 November until 7 January 1940, entitled: Picasso: 40 Years of His Art. The exhibition, which was organized by MoMA's director Alfred H. Barr in collaboration with the Art Institute of Chicago, contained 344 works, including Guernica and its studies.

At Picasso's request the safekeeping of Guernica was then entrusted to the Museum of Modern Art, and it was his expressed desire that the painting should not be delivered to Spain until liberty and democracy had been established in the country. Between 1939 and 1952, Guernica traveled extensively in the United States. Between 1941 and 1942, it was exhibited at Harvard University's Fogg Museum twice.

Between 1953 and 1956 it was shown in Brazil, then at the first Picasso retrospective in Milan, Italy, and then in numerous other major European cities before returning to MoMA for a retrospective celebrating Picasso's 75th birthday. It then went to Chicago and Philadelphia. By this time, concern for the state of the painting resulted in a decision to keep it in one place: a room on MoMA's third floor, where it was accompanied by several of Picasso's preliminary studies and some of Dora Maar's photographs of the work in progress. The studies and photos were often loaned for other exhibitions, but until 1981, Guernica itself remained at MoMA.

During the Vietnam War, the room containing the painting became the site of occasional anti-war vigils. These were usually peaceful and uneventful, but on 28 February 1974, Tony Shafrazi—ostensibly protesting Second Lieutenant William Calley's petition for habeas corpus following his indictment and sentencing for the murder of 109 Vietnamese civilians during the My Lai massacre—defaced the painting with red spray paint, painting the words "KILL LIES ALL". The paint was removed with relative ease from the varnished surface.

== Establishment in Spain ==
As early as 1968, Franco had expressed an interest in having Guernica come to Spain. However, Picasso refused to allow this until the Spanish people again enjoyed a republic. He later added other conditions, such as the restoration of "public liberties and democratic institutions". Picasso died in 1973. Franco, ten years Picasso's junior, died two years later, in 1975. After Franco's death, Spain was transformed into a democratic constitutional monarchy, ratified by a new constitution in 1978. However, MoMA was reluctant to give up one of its greatest treasures and argued that a monarchy did not represent the republic that had been stipulated in Picasso's will as a condition for the painting's delivery. Under great pressure from a number of observers, MoMA finally ceded the painting to Spain in 1981. The Spanish historian Javier Tusell was one of the negotiators.

Upon its arrival in Spain in September 1981, it was first displayed behind bomb-and bullet-proof glass screens at the Casón del Buen Retiro in Madrid in time to celebrate the centenary of Picasso's birth, 25 October. The exhibition was visited by almost a million people in the first year. Since that time there has never been any attempted vandalism or other security threat to the painting.

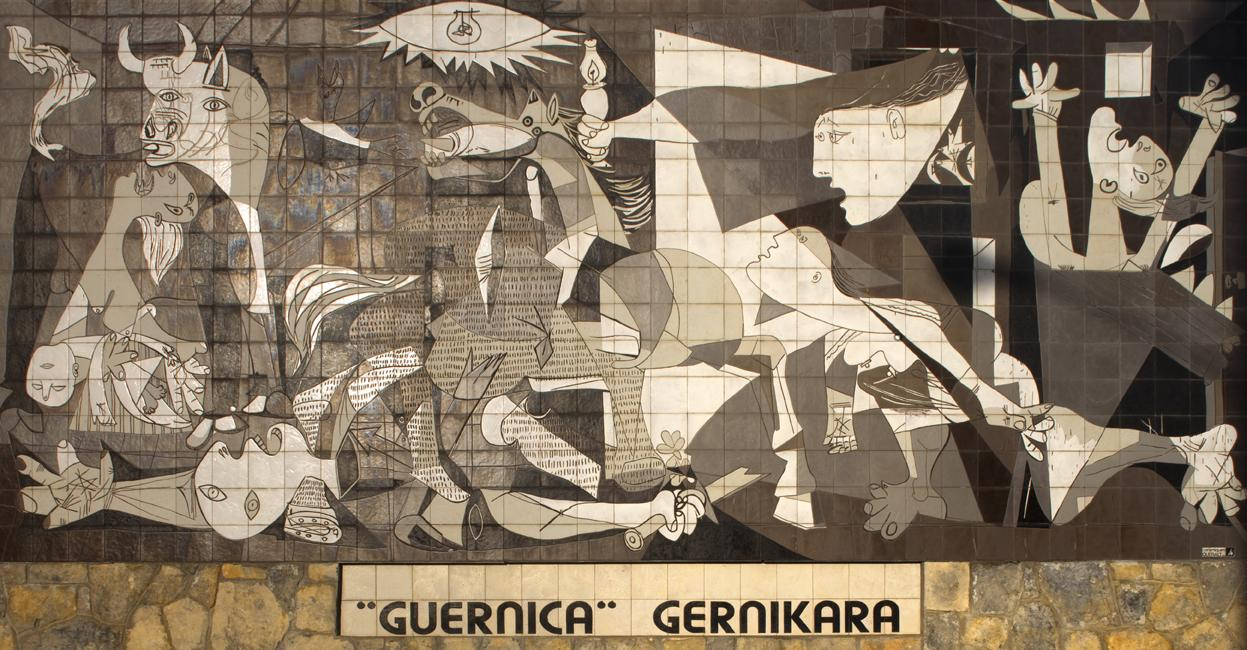
A tiled wall in Gernika claims "Guernica" Gernikara, "The Guernica (painting) to Gernika"

In 1992, the painting was moved from the Museo del Prado to a purpose-built gallery at the Museo Nacional Centro de Arte Reina Sofía, both in Madrid, along with about two dozen preparatory works. This action was controversial in Spain, since Picasso's will stated that the painting should be displayed at the Prado. However, the move was part of a transfer of all of the Prado's collections of art after the early 19th century to other nearby buildings in the city for reasons of space; the Reina Sofía, which houses the capital's national collection of 20th-century art, was the natural place to move it to. At the Reina Sofía, the painting has roughly the same protection as any other work.

Basque nationalists have advocated that the picture be brought to the Basque Country, especially after the building of the Guggenheim Bilbao Museum. Officials at the Reina Sofía claim that the canvas is now thought to be too fragile to move. Even the staff of the Guggenheim do not see a permanent transfer of the painting as possible, although the Basque government continues to support the possibility of a temporary exhibition in Bilbao.

== Tapestry at the United Nations ==
A full-size tapestry copy of Picasso's Guernica, by Jacqueline de la Baume Dürrbach, hangs at the Headquarters of the United Nations in New York City at the entrance to the Security Council room. It is less monochromatic than the original and uses several shades of brown.

The Guernica tapestry was first displayed from 1985 to 2009, and returned in 2015. Originally commissioned in 1955 by Nelson Rockefeller, since Picasso refused to sell him the original, the tapestry was placed on loan to the United Nations by the Rockefeller estate in 1985.

On 5 February 2003 a large blue curtain was placed to cover over the work at the UN, so that it would not be visible in the background during press conferences by Colin Powell and John Negroponte as they were arguing in favor of war on Iraq. On the following day, UN officials claimed that the curtain was placed there at the request of television news crews, who had complained that the wild lines and screaming figures made for a bad backdrop, and that a horse's hindquarters appeared just above the faces of any speakers. Some diplomats, however, in talks with journalists claimed that the Bush administration pressured UN officials to cover the tapestry, rather than have it in the background while Powell or other US diplomats argued for war on Iraq. In a critique of the covering, columnist Alejandro Escalona hypothesized that Guernica's "unappealing ménage of mutilated bodies and distorted faces proved to be too strong for articulating to the world why the US was going to war in Iraq", while referring to the work as "an inconvenient masterpiece".

On 17 March 2009, Deputy Spokesperson for the Secretary-General Marie Okabe announced that the Guernica tapestry had been moved to a gallery in London in advance of extensive renovations at UN Headquarters. The Guernica tapestry was the showcase piece for the grand reopening of the Whitechapel Gallery. It was located in the 'Guernica room' which was originally part of the old Whitechapel Library. In 2012 the tapestry was on loan from the Rockefeller family to the San Antonio Museum of Art in San Antonio, Texas. It was returned to the UN by March 2015. Nelson A. Rockefeller Jr., the owner of the tapestry, took it back in February 2021. In February 2022, it was returned to the wall outside the UN Security Council.

== Significance and legacy ==
"Guernica is to painting what Beethoven's Ninth Symphony is to music: a cultural icon that speaks to mankind not only against war but also of hope and peace. It is a reference when speaking about genocide from El Salvador to Bosnia."

— Alejandro Escalona, on the 75th anniversary of the painting's creation

During the 1970s, Guernica was a symbol for Spaniards of both the end of the Franco regime following Franco's death and of Basque nationalism. The Basque left has repeatedly used imagery from the picture. An example is the organization Etxerat, which uses a reversed image of the lamp as its symbol. Guernica has since become a universal and powerful symbol warning humanity against the suffering and devastation of war. There are no obvious references to the specific attack, making its message universal and timeless.

Art historian and curator W. J. H. B. Sandberg argued in Daedalus in 1960 that Picasso pioneered a "new language" combining expressionistic and cubist techniques in Guernica. Sandberg wrote that Guernica conveyed an “expressionistic message” in its focus on the inhumanity of the air raid, while using "the language of cubism". For Sandberg, the work's defining cubist features included its use of diagonals, which rendered the painting's setting "ambiguous, unreal, inside and outside at the same time". In 2016, the British art critic Jonathan Jones called the painting a "Cubist apocalypse" and stated that Picasso "was trying to show the truth so viscerally and permanently that it could outstare the daily lies of the age of dictators".

Works inspired by Guernica include Faith Ringgold's 1967 painting The American People Series #20: Die; Goshka Macuga's The Nature of the Beast (2009–2010), which used the Whitechapel-hosted United Nations Guernica tapestry; The Keiskamma Guernicas (2010–2017); and Erica Luckert's theatrical production of Guernica (2011–2012). Art and design historian Dr Nicola Ashmore curated an exhibition, Guernica Remakings, at the University of Brighton galleries from 29 July 2017 to 23 August 2017.

Actress Kristen Stewart tattooed a portion of the painting on one of her forearms. She explained: "It’s part of Guernica, a Picasso painting that I saw when I was 18 in Madrid and it floored me. It was the first time I’ve ever responded to a piece of art like that. It’s a sort of dismal depiction with this little shred of light – if you just turn the light back on everything will be fine. I like the imagery, the combination of the eye, the sun and the people as a light bulb as if they are making a movie. Literally, it’s just perfect for me. I love the memory and the idea: keep going, keep the fucking light on.”

In the Wano Country arc of the manga series One Piece, there is a character named Guernika belonging to the spy organization known as Cipher Pol. The character himself physically resembles the painting, with his partner Maha matching in name as it links to an author who used the pen name Maha, after the painting La Maja Desnuda, who wrote a book titled after the painting.

== See also ==
- Guernica, 1950 film directed by Alain Resnais and Robert Hessens
- The 2018 television series Genius features Picasso's life and work, including Guernica
- The Weeping Woman, 1937 Picasso painting
- Guernica, 1937 sculpture by René Iché
- The Charnel House, 1944–45 Picasso painting
- Massacre in Korea, 1951 Picasso painting
- Dove, 1949 Picasso lithograph
- 1980 BBC series 100 Great Paintings
- "Guernica", 2023 song by Ian Hunter
- The Hiroshima Panels, a series of 15 panels each measuring 1.8 metres x 7.2 metres depicting the atomic bombings of Hiroshima
- The American People Series 20: Die, an oil painting by Faith Ringgold depicting riots across America in the 1960s

== References and sources ==
Sources

- Arnheim, Rudolf. (1973). The Genesis of a Painting: Picasso's Guernica. London: University of California Press. ISBN 978-0-520-25007-9
- Barton, Simon. (2004). A History of Spain. New York: Palgrave Macmillan.
- Becht-Jördens, Gereon: Picassos Guernica als kunsttheoretisches Programm. In: Becht-Jördens, Gereon and Wehmeier, (In German) Peter M.: Picasso und die christliche Ikonographie. Mutterbeziehung und künstlerische Position. Dietrich Reimer, Berlin 2003, S. 209–237 ISBN 3-496-01272-2
- Becraft, Melvin E. Picasso's Guernica – Images within Images 3rd Edition PDF download
- Beevor, Antony. (2006) The Battle for Spain: The Spanish Civil War 1936–1939. London: Weidenfeld & Nicolson. ISBN 978-0-297-84832-5
- Blunt, Anthony. (1969) Picasso's Guernica. Oxford: Oxford University Press. ISBN 0-19-500135-4
- Bonazzoli, Francesca, and Michele Robecchi. (2014) "Pablo Picasso: Guernica", in Mona Lisa to Marge: How the World's Greatest Artworks Entered Popular Culture. New York: Prestel. ISBN 978-379134877-3
- Campbell, Peter (2009). "At the New Whitechapel" London Review of Books 31(8), 30 April 2009.
- Cohen, David. (2003) Hidden Treasures: What's So Controversial About Picasso's Guernica?, Slate, 6 February 2003. Accessed 16 July 2006.
- Fluegel, Jane. (1980) "Chronology" in Rubin (1980) Pablo Picasso: A Retrospective.
- Francesconi, Elizabeth. (2006) "A Look Inside Picasso's War Images", discourse: An Online Journal by the students of Southern Methodist University, Spring 2006.
- Granell, Eugenio Fernándes, Picasso's Guernica: the end of a Spanish era Archived 10 August 2023 at the Wayback Machine (Ann Arbor, Mich. : UMI Research Press, 1981) ISBN 0-8357-1206-0, ISBN 978-0-8357-1206-4
- Greenberg, Clement (1993). The Collected Essays and Criticism; Volume 4: Modernism with a Vengeance, 1957–1969. University of Chicago Press. ISBN 0226306240
- Harris, Mark and Becraft, Melvin E. Picasso's Secret Guernica
- Hensbergen, Gijs van. (2004) Guernica: The Biography of a Twentieth-Century Icon. London: Bloomsbury. ISBN 978-1-58234-124-8
- Hensbergen, Gijs van. (2009) "Piecing together Guernica". BBC News Magazine: 7 April 2009. Accessed: 14 August 2009.
- Hoberman, J. "Pop and Circumstance". The Nation, 13 December 2004, 22–26.
- Kennedy, Maev. (2009) "Picasso tapestry of Guernica heads to UK", London: The Guardian, 26 January 2009. Accessed: 14 August 2009.
- Mallen, Enrique On-Line Picasso Project – OPP.37:001.
- Martin, Russell. (2003). Picasso's War. London: Simon & Schuster UK. ISBN 978-0-7434-7863-2
- Martin, Russell. (2002) Picasso's War: The Destruction of Guernica and the Masterpiece that Changed the World (2002). On-line excerpts link.
- Oppler, Ellen C. (ed). (1988). Picasso's Guernica (Norton Critical Studies in art History). New York: W. W. Norton. ISBN 0-393-95456-0
- PBS On-line supplement to "Treasures of the World" series, "Guernica: Testimony to War" with Guernica timeline.
- Pisik, Betsy. (2003) "The Picasso Cover-Up". The Washington Times, 3 February 2003. Re-published at CommonDreams.org. Accessed: 14 August 2009
- Preston, Paul. (2007) "George Steer and Guernica". History Today 57 (2007): 12–19.
- Ray, Beverly. (2006) "Analyzing Political Art to Get at Historical Fact: Guernica and the Spanish Civil War". The Social Studies 97 (2006): 168–171.
- Richardson, John (2016) "A Different Guernica". The New York Review of Books, 12 May 2016, 63 (8): 4–6.
- Rubin, William, ed. (1980) Pablo Picasso: A Retrospective. New York: The Museum of Modern Art. ISBN 0-87070-519-9
- Thomas, Gordon & Morgan-Witts, Max. (1975). The Day Guernica Died. London: Hodder & Stoughton. ISBN 0-340-19043-4
- Tóibín, Colm. (2006) "The art of war", London: The Guardian, 29 April 2006. Accessed: 14 August 2009.
- Witham, Larry (2013). Picasso and the chess player: Pablo Picasso, Marcel Duchamp, and the battle for the soul of modern art. Hanover; London : University Press of New England. ISBN 9781611682533
