= Physical geography of the Basque Country =

The physical geography of the Basque Country is very diverse despite the small size of the region. The territory hosts a blend of green and brown to yellowish tones, featuring hilly terrain altogether. The Basque Country spreads from the rough coastal landscape to the semi-desert of the Bardenas on the south-eastern fringes of Navarre.

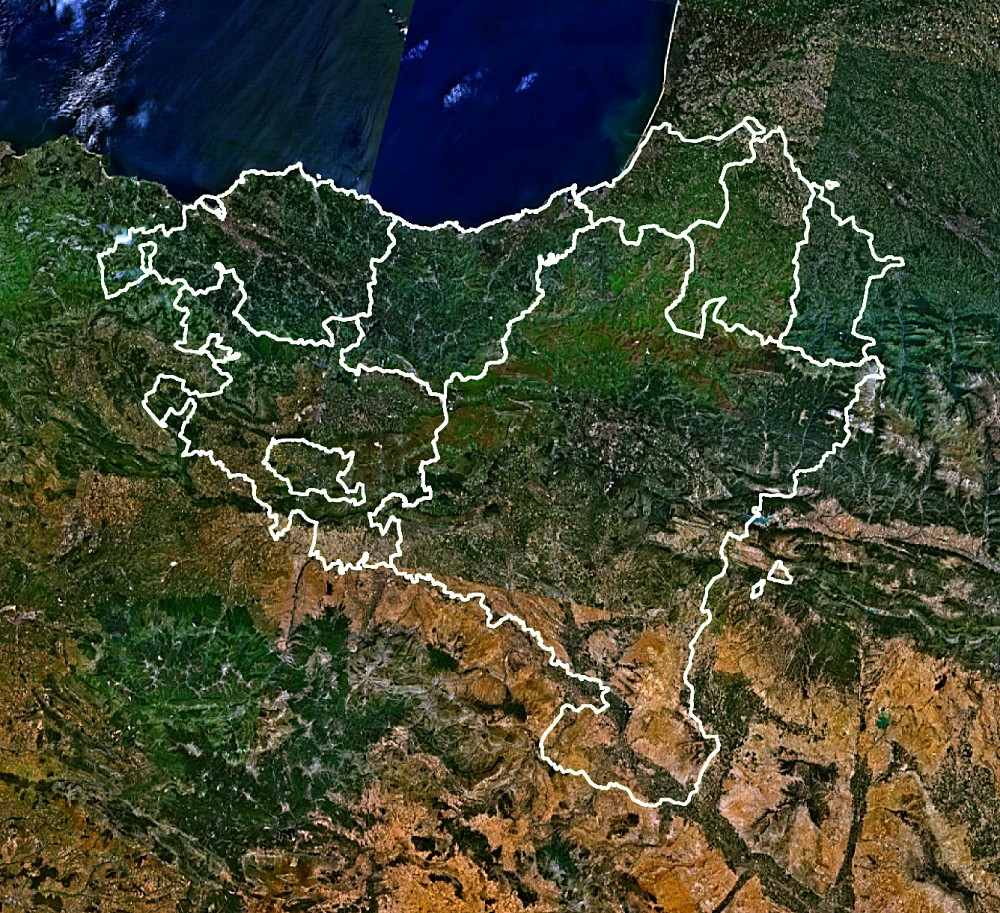
The view of the Basque Country from the landsat satellite

The main natural limits of the Basque Country are the Bay of Biscay (south-east of Cantabrian Sea) to the north and westside, and in the south side, the Ebro river. The highest point in the Basque Country is the Hiru Erregeen Mahaia peak (2438 m high).

== Coast ==
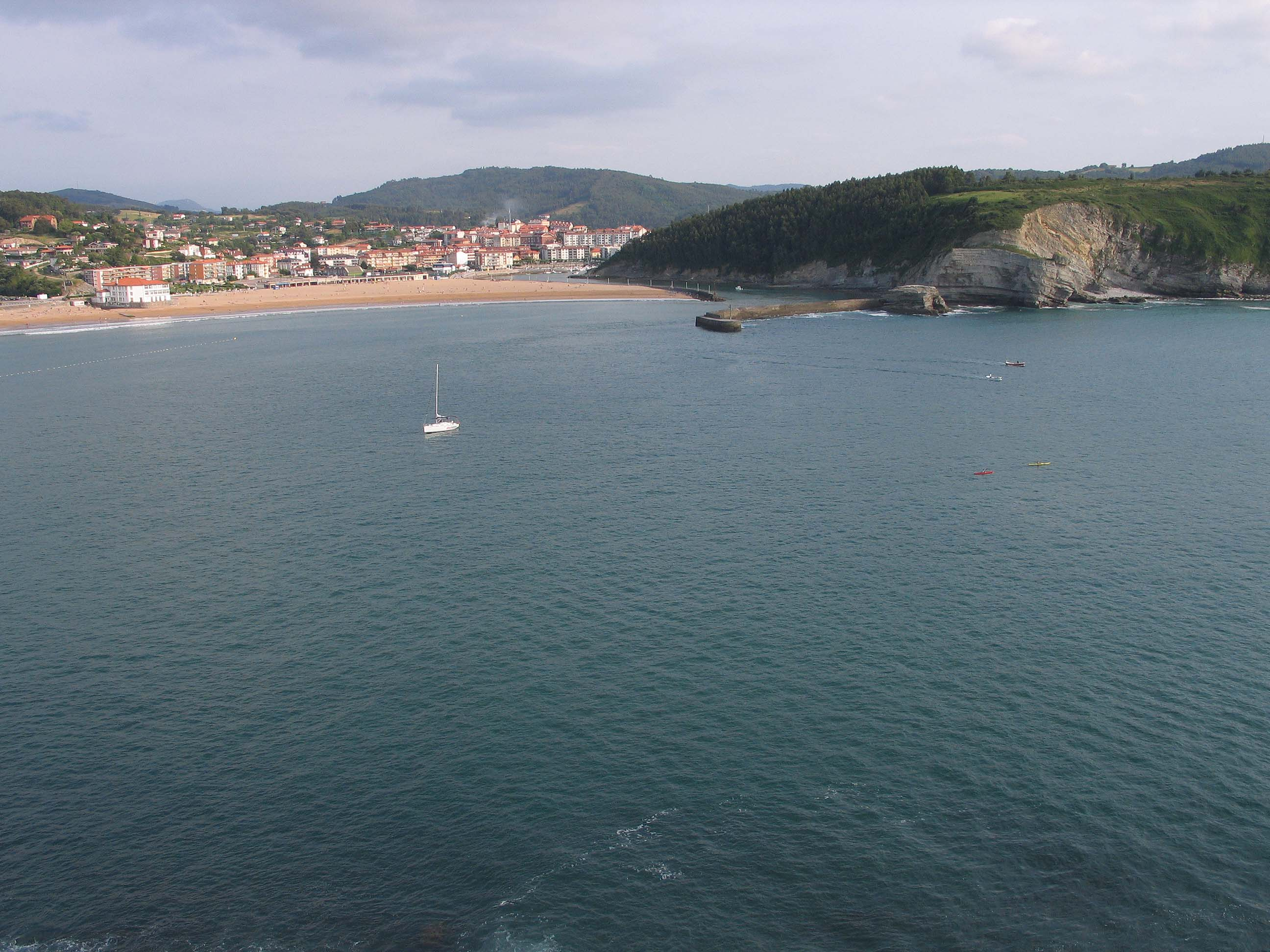
The Butroe river joins the sea in Plentzia

The coast of the Basque Country has three sides. The coast of Biscay is rough but in general there are big beaches. There are also at least two big estuaries, that of Ibaizabal (known also as the Ría de Bilbao) and Urdaibai.

The coast of Gipuzkoa shows a more rugged terrain and in general the slopes are steeper. From the limit of Biscay to Zumaia there are smaller beaches and they are more rocky. East of Zumaia, they are larger and longer. When different rivers join the sea, small estuaries can be found (Oria), and in the others, maritime branches (Urumea, Bidasoa).

The coast of Lapurdi is flatter. The beaches are longer and the slopes gentler. The rivers Bidasoa and Adour join the ocean in Lapurdi.

== Mountains ==
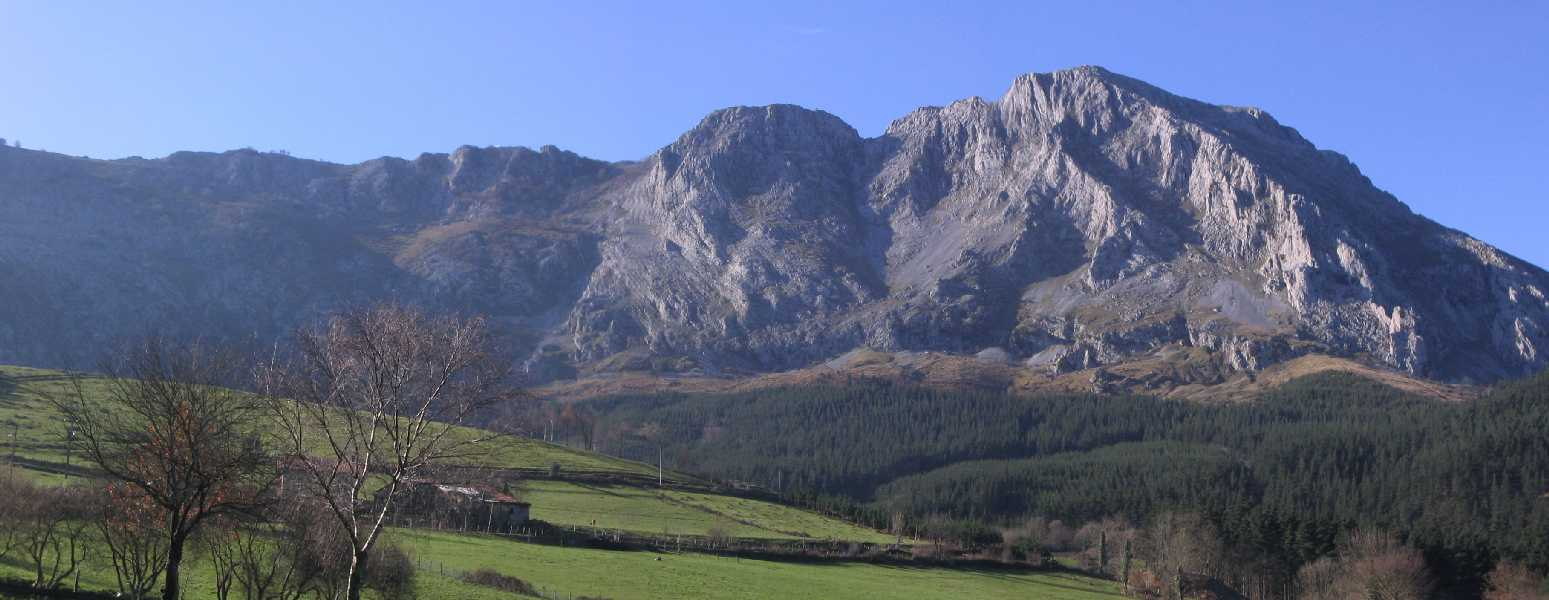
The Aliutz mountain (Biscay)

The Basque country is mountainous. Most of the mountains are along an east-west axis, at the west of the Pyrenees.

The most important rock there is limestone, but there are also mountains composed of other materials. For example, Aiako Harria is composed of granite.

The highest mountain is Hiru Errege Maila.

The south of Álava and Navarre is the middle east limit of Cantabrian Mountains. There are mountains like Kodes and Toloño. Between those importants mountains there are Euskal mendiak: Urbasa, Andia, Aralar, Anboto, Ordunte or Aizkorri.

== Rivers ==
The Ebro is the largest river which crosses the Basque Country. It is 910 km long, and flows along the southern boundary of the Basque Country before it joins the Mediterranean sea. On its way east, the Ebro harvests the water of a string of tributaries, such as Zadorra, Baias, Ega and Aragon. Aragon's course is the longest, at 192 km. The river rises in Astun, located in Aragon; it flows down past the Esa reservoir, and crosses thereafter eastern Navarre until it joins the river of Ebro.

Aturri, which joins the sea in the coast of Basque Country, is the largest river and has the biggest water flow. Its source is in Tourmalet and it joins the sea in Baiona, crosses 335 km of land, the last 30 km of which are in Basque Country. It has several tributaries from the Pyrenees, including the Biduze, Errobi, and Aran. Like Aturri, other Basque rivers join the sea in the Bay of Biscay, such as Nerbioi, Bidasoa, Oria, Deba, Urola, and Urumea. The Nerbioi is the longest such river in the Basque Country, with a length of 75 km.

== Forests ==
The forest of Irati is the largest in the Basque Country, and one of the main beech forests in Europe. It covers parts of Lower Navarre, Zuberoa and Spanish Navarre.

Otherwise, from Sakana to Aezkoa extending all over the north of Navarre, deciduous forests abound. These breed of trees can be also found on the east of Álava, in the region called Mendialdea and Araialdea, and in Zuberoa and Lower Navarre. They exist in Gipuzkoa too, in the middle of Urola and in Aralar.

In Biscay, there are evergreen forests throughout 66% of the province. The main exceptions of this are some places of Enkarterri and in Durango (Urkiola Natural Park). In Gipuzkoa, 56% of the trees there are conifers, but in Álava they consist of only 28% of the trees.

Currently, 55% of Basque Country is covered by trees, and in Navarre the figure is 45%.

== Desert ==
The natural park of Barde is the biggest desert, and is located in the south east of Navarre. It is 41.845 hectares in area. It is 45 km from north to south, and 24 km from west to east.

== Geographical landscapes ==
- Gaztelugatxe
- Bilbao
- San Sebastián
- Irati Forest
- Urdaibai estuary
- Oma forest
- Santimamiñe
- Pamplona
- Goierri

== See also ==
- Iberian peninsula
- Geography of Europe
- Sierra Salvada
