= Urdaibai Bird Center =

Coordinates: 43.3469°N 2.6569°W

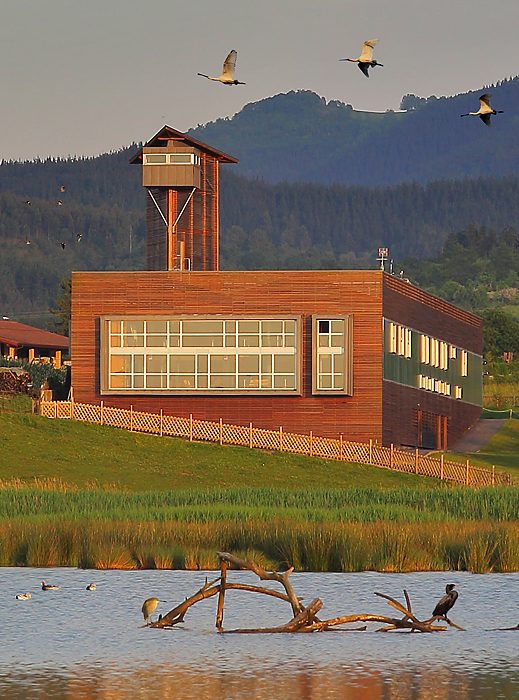
- The building is situated by the marsh in Gautegiz Arteaga
- Established: 2012
- Location: Gautegiz Arteaga, Biscay, Spain
- Public transit access: BUS Bizkaibus: Route Mungia-Gernika-Ibarrangelu, Station: Errekalde, Gautegiz Arteaga
- Parking: On site (no charge)
- Website: http://www.birdcenter.org/en

Urdaibai Bird Center is a nature museum. It provides an excellent observation point from which visitors can enjoy the world of birds and their migratory journeys. It is located in the heart of the Urdaibai Biosphere Reserve in Vizcaya, Basque Country (Spain) The center opened its doors to the public in 2012 and works in the areas of scientific research and dissemination. It is managed by the Aranzadi Society of Science, an organization which has over 60 years of experience in the research and dissemination of human and natural sciences. Ornithology is included within these fields and the Aranzadi Banding Office has done pioneering work on the Iberian Peninsula.

== Location ==
Gautegiz Arteaga
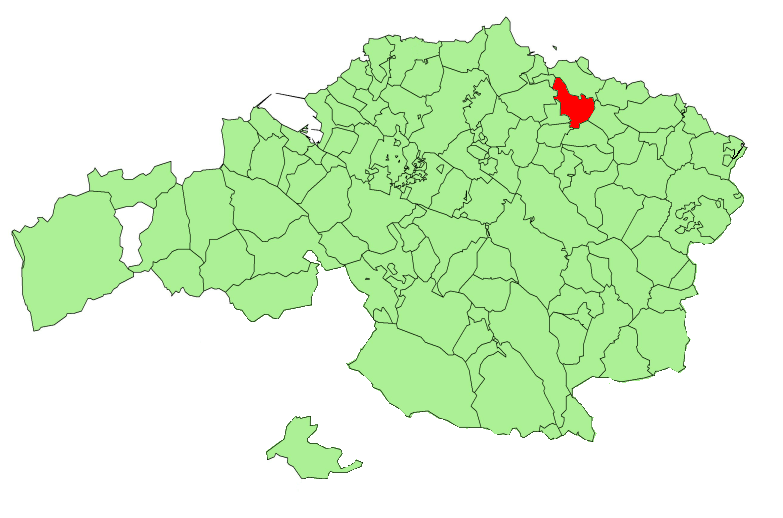
- Location in Biscay

The center is located in the heart of the Urdaibai Biosphere Reserve, a protected natural area that includes one of the most important marshes on the Cantabrian coast. This wetland area is internationally recognized as demonstrated by the fact that it is a Ramsar wetland of international importance, a Special Protection Area for Birds. It is also in the Natura 2000 Network.

The marshes of Urdaibai are formed by the Oka and Golako rivers, which open onto the sea in a wide estuary. It is home to a wide range of different ecosystems and landscapes such as grasslands, Cantabrian holm oak woods, Atlantic countryside, riverbanks, marshes, cliffs, beaches and dunes. It is this mosaic of landscapes that make Urdaibai the area with the highest level of biodiversity in the Basque Country.

Among the many habitats, wetlands provide an essential source of food and shelter for waterfowl. They are one of the most important focuses of the work carried out by the Urdaibai Bird Center. The center is located in Gautegiz Arteaga next to a wetland area which is of the greatest natural value in Urdaibai.

== History ==
Urdaibai Bird Center has its origins in the Elaia Association, an organization which began its work in the Urdaibai estuary in 2001. Its first projects were conceived from scientific ringing stations in different areas of the Urdaibai marshes. Many birds of particular interest were detected from these ringing stations and monitoring projects were set up.

Scientisits identified areas of special interest for their ornithological wealth or for their general biodiversity in the upper marsh. As a result, they started a more comprehensive monitoring programme of one of the most important ornithological phenomena in Urdaibai: the migration of birds. During the research programme, a serious loss of biodiversity was discovered and the first steps were taken to make environmental improvements in the marsh.

A work group was set up to develop new ideas and this project became what is now the Urdaibai Bird Center.

=== Restoration of the wetlands in Gautegiz ===
Until just a few years ago, the area now occupied by the Orueta wetland was very run down and the fact that it had become almost disconnected from the influence of the tides had led to the invasion of exotic species. This situation was the result of the way the marsh had been used and altered throughout history.

During the eighteenth century, the inner marshes were drained to make them into fields for crops and then later pastures for livestock. In the twentieth century, the course of the river was canalized in Guernica-Lumo and this resulted in the total isolation of the remaining wetlands. Finally, however, the fields were abandoned and began to break up. Once more the tide was allowed in, and the natural process of regeneration slowly began. Its progress was hindered, however, by the invasion of the exotic flora referred to previously.

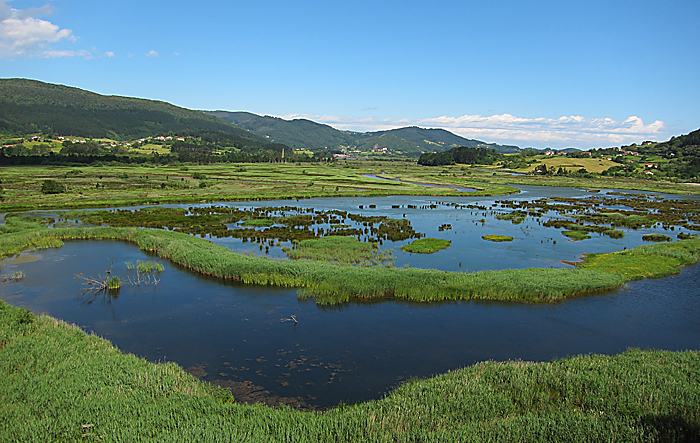
Wetland after restoration

Faced with this problem, the local population undertook an environmental improvement project in the marsh. It aimed to encourage the correct use of the marsh through birdwatching. After evaluating several alternatives, lagoons of varying degrees of salinity and depths were created. The environmental improvement project was carried out between 2008 and 2009.

The restoration results were very positive. Today, total recovery of halophyte vegetation has been achieved in the abandoned area which was being invaded by alien species. Reeds, cattails, sea rushes and carex are now present. In addition, the spread of invasive species is now under control.

As for wildlife, birds have been extremely receptive to the new conditions. 5 years after the start of the project, a great diversity of species has been recorded and there are large numbers of birds at all times of year. In addition to the birds, odonata of great interest have also colonised the wetland. Before its recovery their presence had never been registered.

== Facilities ==
Visitors can admire the landscape of the Urdaibai estuary from the Bird Center tower. Inside the center a series of audiovisual modules provide the visitor with up to date information. Educational material and audiovisual resources are produced by the center itself.

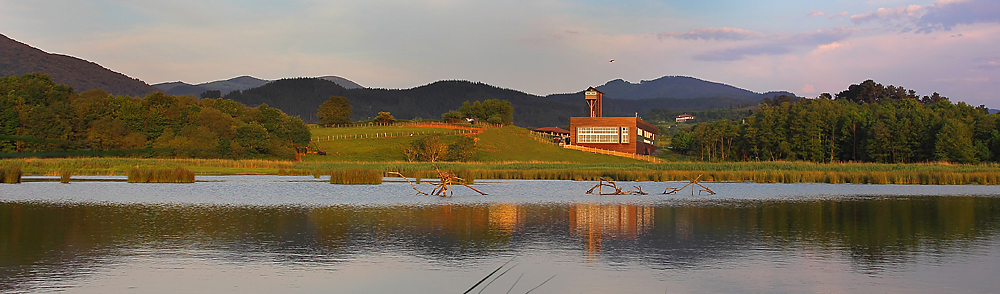
Urdaibai Bird Center from the marsh

In the hallway a large backlit map locates the center on the Eastern Atlantic Flyway and also illustrates the connection between Urdaibai and wetlands of importance in Europe and Africa.

In addition to this, there is a space for temporary exhibitions and an audiovisual module that explains the habitats and birds of the Urdaibai Biosphere Reserve and also the current ornithological state of the marsh. It also provides information on projects and lines of investigation which are being carried out.

The Urdaibai Bird Center has a role in weather forecasting and houses meteorological equipment from Euskalmet, the Basque meteorological agency. It has a weather station and also a radio sounding station which are included in a global network. The radio sounding station is unique in the Basque Country and the only example in the world of a system which is integrated into a building. In order to forecast the weather, a balloon is released on a daily basis. It analyses the air layers and collects the data required for forecasting. Visitors can also enjoy a replica of Euskalmet's Meteorological Radar, Kapildui.

Facilities

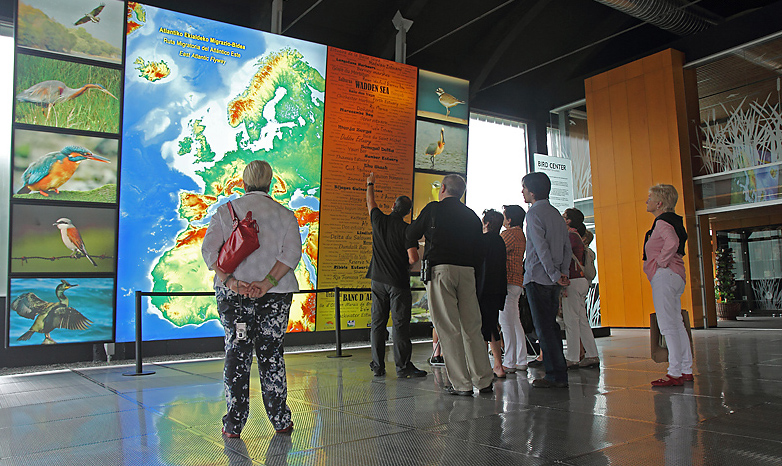
Hall and migration map

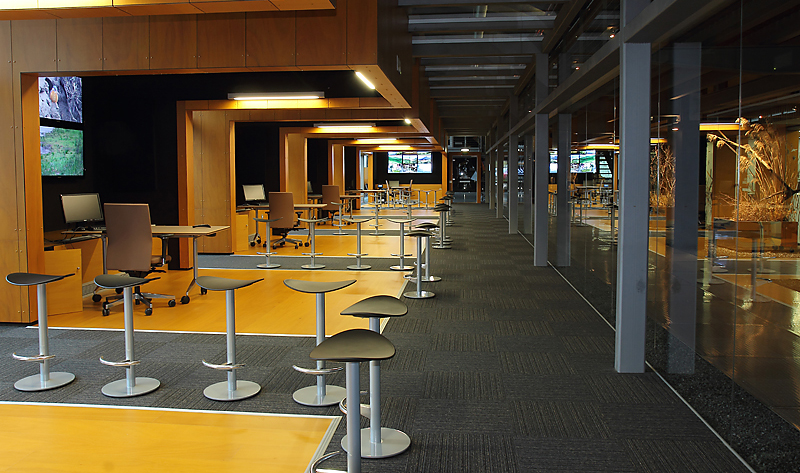
Audiovisual modules

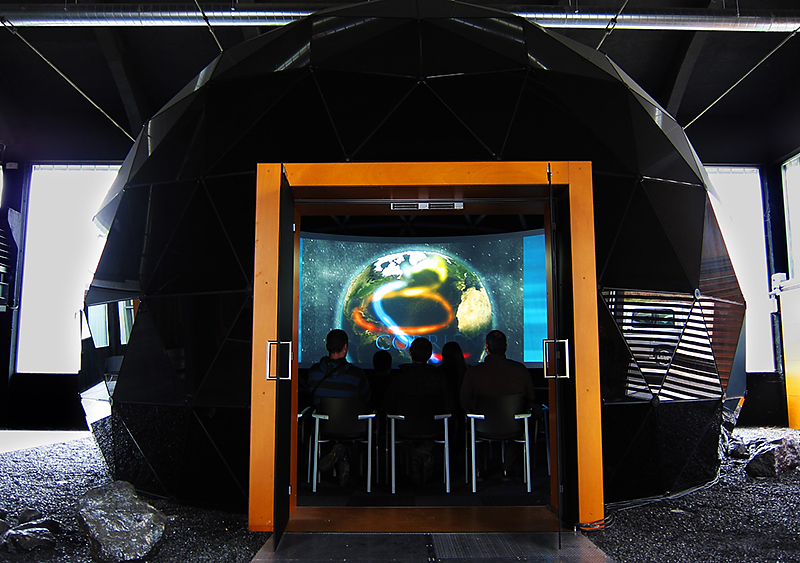
Dome. Meteorological auditorium

The building also provides a number of other useful spaces:

- The Reception - this is both a tourist information point for visitors and also a shop selling products and material related to ornithology.
- The Conference Room - here the center holds lectures, courses or other events
- Meeting rooms.
- Bird Ringing Area - here staff members do ongoing research work into the salt marsh.

There is also an ornithological route in the form of a circuit. It is equipped with two outdoor observatories which birders can access for free. Each hide allows visitors to view a wetland area of different characteristics along with birds of that particular habitat.

== Visits to the center ==
Urdaibai Bird Center is open to the public throughout the year and gives visitors the opportunity to learn more about the ornithological wealth of the Urdaibai Biosphere Reserve. Several visits are available for the visitors, independent tours and guided tours.

== Work areas ==
Urdaibai Bird Center has two main lines of work. The first involves research and the second involves the dissemination of the results from that research. In addition, the center manages and maintains the habitat.

=== Research projects ===
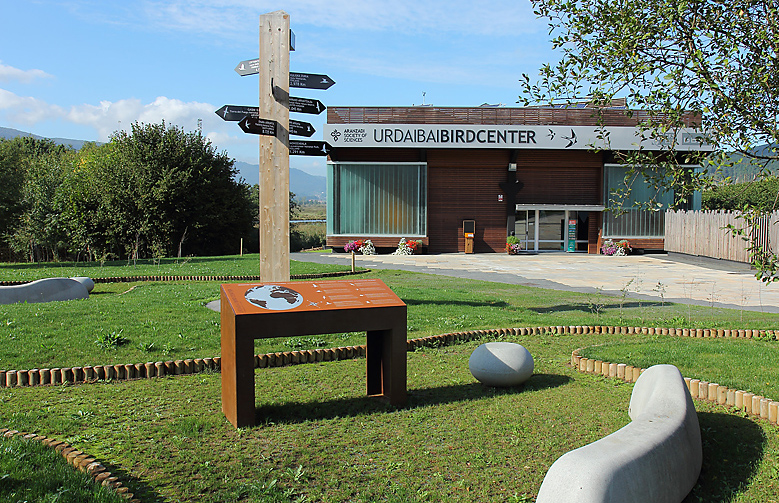
Urdaibai Bird Center exterior

To increase the knowledge of birds and their habitats in the Urdaibai Biosphere Reserve research projects are carried out in the following areas.

- Migration: The migration of birds is studied, as are the factors that influence birds in their stopover and resting areas. The migratory connections between different populations are also being researched.
- Population dynamics and conservation status of birds in Urdaibai.
- Spatial ecology: Analysis of local habitat use.

Different projects have been developed taking these basic areas into account:

- Bird ringing: This is an essential tool for monitoring bird populations and to improve the understanding of their migratory routes. Bird ringers are working hard worldwide to maintain and update a database which makes it possible to monitor the migratory routes of different species and therefore identify areas which are essential for conservation. Urdaibai Bird Center works in several ringing stations and complements annual ringing periods with campaigns in which specific data is obtained on a species or population.
- Follow-up projects using new technologies: Thanks to the development of technology, new information gathering techniques have been implemented. Among these are geo locators, GPS devices for larger birds like the osprey and radio tracking. They have provided a more complete picture of migratory routes and there is a better understanding of areas which are dangerous for protected species.

=== Scientific and environmental dissemination ===
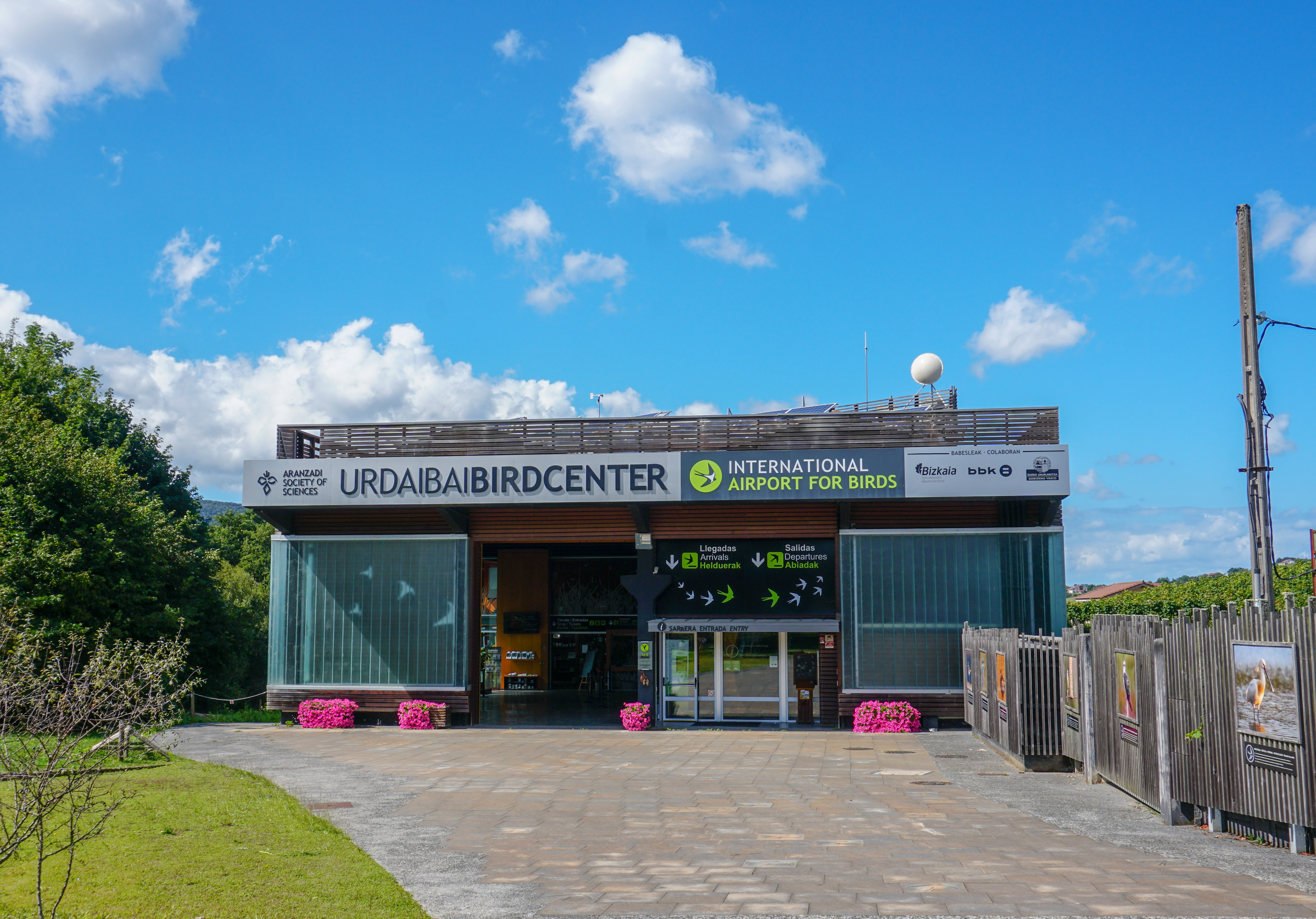
Entrance

Urdaibai Bird Center aims to raise awareness of environmental issues and the impact of human beings and their activities on nature. For this reason the center is involved in educational projects with different sectors of society.

==== Visits to the center ====
Activities are organized for people interested in getting to know more about the world of ornithology whether it be scientific ringing, meteorology or the biodiversity of the area. These visits aim to promote a sense of respect for nature, and also to bring the work of the scientific community to the attention of the public. By involving people, habits and attitudes are changed and meaning is given to the scientific work which has been carried out.

==== Projects with schools ====
Urdaibai Bird Center has developed environmental education programmes for children in a number of schools. Using cross curricular material, students learn about the birds of Urdaibai. Through this collaboration, the study of birds can be integrated into every subject.

Within these school programmes, the center runs activities such as placing nest boxes and feeders for birds during the winter, or the monitoring of winter finches and bluebirds by ringing.

=== Habitat conservation ===
The center's work also involves the management of the marshland. The eradication of invasive alien species such ''Baccharis halimifolia'' is one of the main tasks which is carried out as is the management of vegetation to ensure maximum diversity.

== Ornithological wealth ==
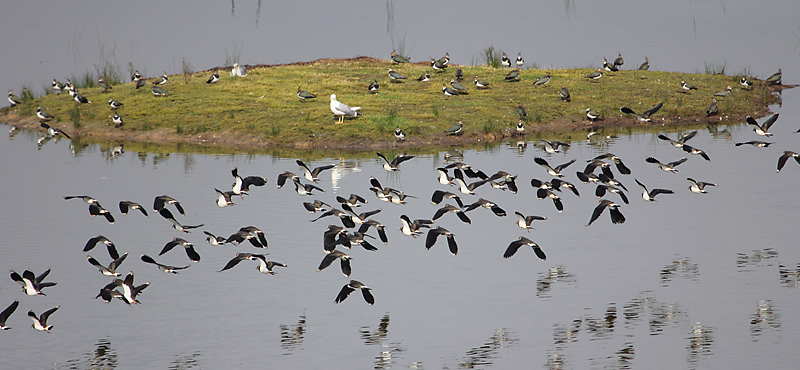
Group of lapwings in the wetland

The Urdaibai Biosphere Reserve has one of the highest rates of biodiversity in the Basque Country and the same is true in terms of avifauna. Its ornithological wealth is partly due to the wide variety of landscapes in the reserve. However, it is also due to its location right between two large geographical barriers that are formed by the Pyrenees and the Cantabrian Sea. Every year these barriers force thousands of birds to cross this area on the migratory journeys between Europe and Africa.

The marshes of Gautegiz-Arteaga, are home to a wide variety of birds in large numbers There are around 200 species. The tranquility of the area and the availability of food, in particular the abundance of fish and small invertebrates, are a great attraction for waterfowl. Moreover, different salinities and depths of wetland water allow species from very different habits to coexist.

All this has made wetlands of Gautegiz-Arteaga a mandatory stop for migratory birds. What is more, the number of wintering, nesting and resident birds in the wetlands is growing, a sure sign that the wetland is well on the way to a full recovery.

Along with other ornithological centers, Urdaibai Bird Center participates in the project BirdFlyway. This network of European wetlands makes up a tourist route and all of the participating organizations have two elements in common:

- They are part of the migratory route of two bird species, the greylag goose and the osprey.
- They have visitor centers in unique natural spaces.

== Bibliography ==
Urdaibai Bird Center. Memoria de investigación, 2013. Arizaga, J. (Coor.). Inédito. Sociedad de Ciencias Aranzadi.

Urdaibai Bird Center. Memoria de investigación, 2012. 2013. Arizaga, J. (Coor.) Informe Inédito. Sociedad de Ciencias Aranzadi.

Informe de anillamiento del 2011 de la Estación de Anillamiento Científico de Urdaibai. 2012. Unamuno, E., Azkona, A., Unamuno, J.M., Arizaga, J., Galarza, A., Unamuno, A. (Informe inédito Gobierno Vasco)

Informe de anillamiento del 2010 de la Estación de Anillamiento Científico de Urdaibai. 2011. Unamuno, E., Azkona, A., Unamuno, J.M., Unamuno, A. (Informe inédito Gobierno Vasco)

Informe de anillamiento del 2009 de la Estación de Anillamiento Científico de Urdaibai. 2010. Azkona, A., Unamuno, J.M., Unamuno, E., Unamuno, A., Ruiz Moneo F. (Informe inédito Gobierno Vasco)

Informe de anillamiento del 2008 de la Estación de Anillamiento Científico de Urdaibai. 2009. Unamuno, J.M., Unamuno, E., Unamuno, A. (Informe inédito Gobierno Vasco)

Informe de anillamiento del 2006 de la Estación de Anillamiento Científico de Urdaibai. 2007. Unamuno, J.M. (Informe inédito Gobierno Vasco)

Informe de anillamiento del 2005 de la Estación de Anillamiento Científico de Urdaibai. 2006. Unamuno, J.M. (Informe inédito Gobierno Vasco)
