= Oma forest =

Artwork by Agustin Ibarrola

Coordinates: 43°19′55″N 2°37′04″W

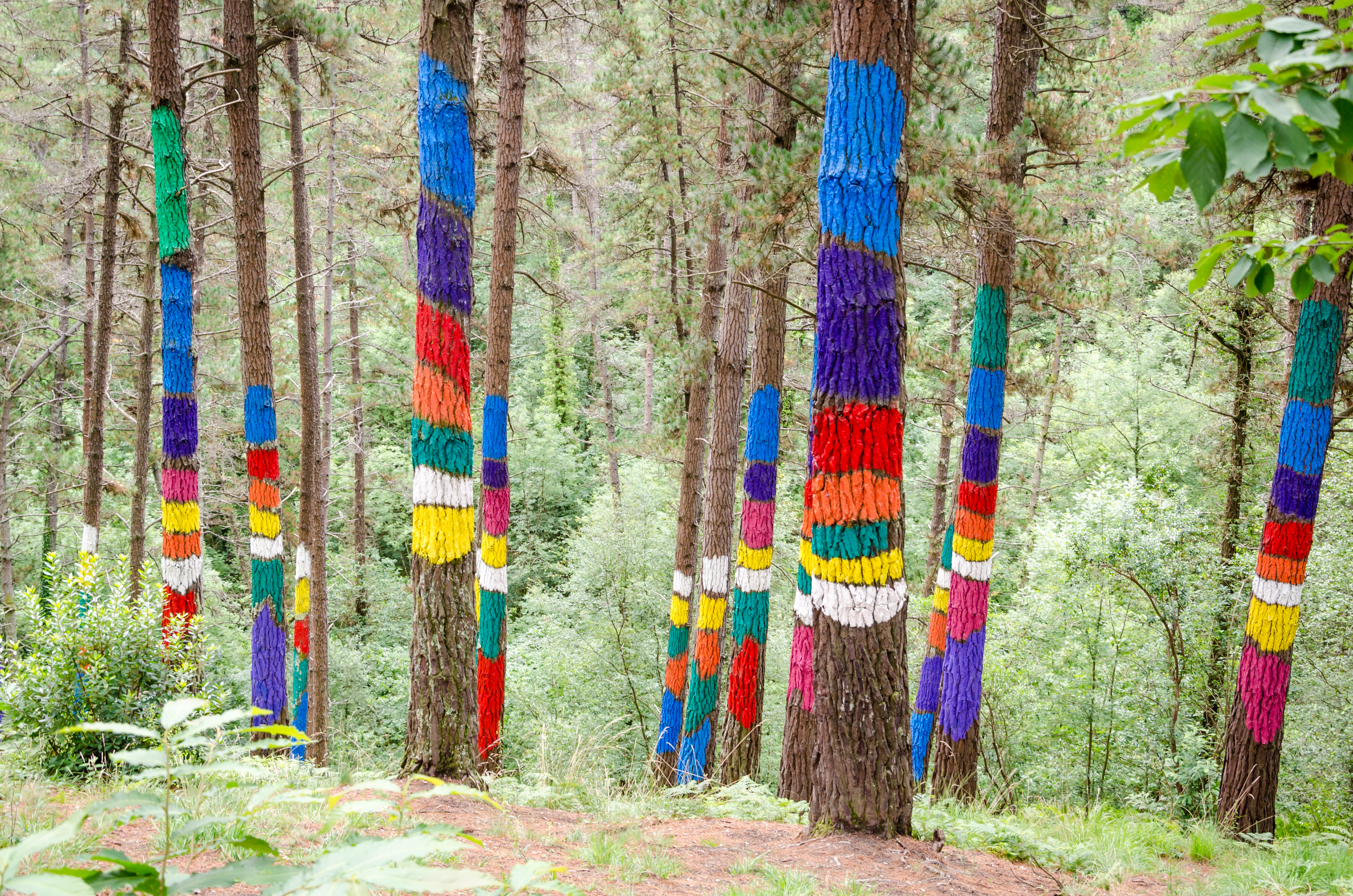
The forest in 2017

Oma forest (“Bosque de Oma” in Spanish) is a work of art created by Agustin Ibarrola, a Basque sculptor and painter. It was painted between 1982 and 1985. The work is located in northern Spain, in a forest near Kortezubi (Biscay, Basque Country), in the natural reserve of Urdaibai. It is located very close to the Santimamiñe cave. It is also known as the "painted forest," or “Bosque Animado” which means “animated forest” in Spanish.

The work is considered part of the Land Art movement. Most of the trees are Monterey pines. The projects aims to display the horrible and ghastly harmony between nature and human presence by painting on the trunks of trees, human figures, animals and geometric shapes, some of which are visible only from certain positions. Agustin Ibarrola was inspired by the cave art in the nearby Santimamiñe caves, and he wanted to paint on natural structures with the same technique that cave people used to paint on natural rock formations.

== Relocation ==
In 2019, a fungal disease known as “brown band” began killing the painted trees, and this disease affected the bark of the trees and ruined the paintings. The Provincial Council of Bizkaia decided to reproduce the artwork in the nearby Basobarri Forest. The reproduction and relocation began around June 2022. The reproduced and relocated art installation won’t be available for public viewing in its entirety until the summer of 2023. The new collection will have 200 more painted pine trees than the old collection. In addition, the Provincial Council of Bizkaia claims that the new Oma Forest will be more sustainable, have greater accessibility, better maintenance, and that there will be safety systems to act upon in case of a fire or other emergency.

== Vandalism ==
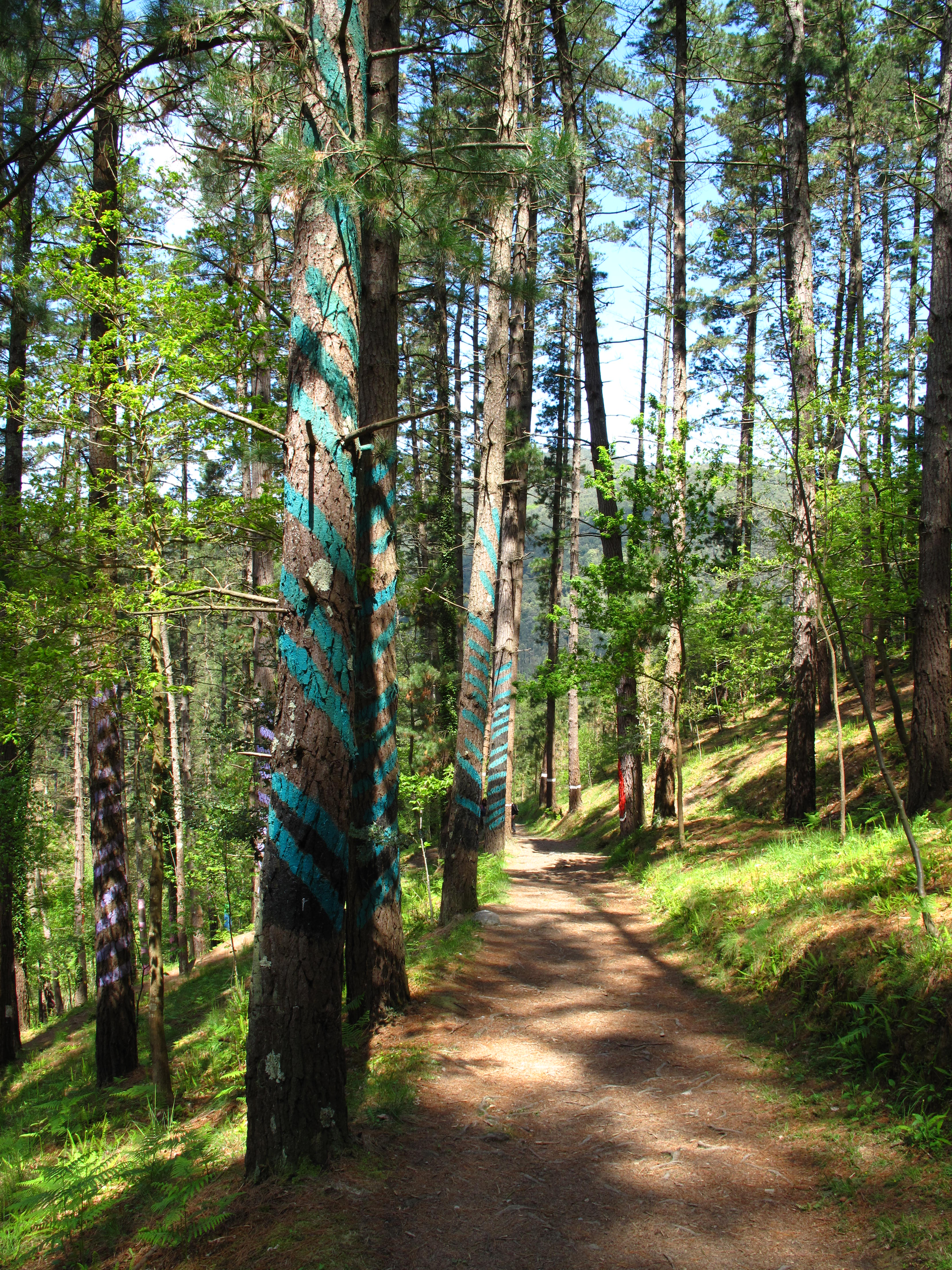
In 2009.

Agustin is a member of “Basta Ya", a group which aims to aid victims of terrorism. Some 100 trees of the natural reserve were destroyed in 2000 and Oma forest was damaged to protest his stand. In 2003, 40 pine trees in Oma forest were vandalized for the same reason.

== In popular culture ==
- In Pokémon Scarlet and Violet, Grafaiai is a Poison/Normal type lemur-like Pokémon known for using its saliva to paint trees with elaborate patterns similar to those found in Oma forest, in order to mark its territory and lure its prey. Grafaiai is native to the Paldea region, which heavily resembles the Iberian Peninsula.
  - The Tagtree Thicket is most likely inspired by Oma forest, and wild Grafaiai can be found there.
- Spanish playwright Pedro Víllora placed the setting of his tragedy Electra in Oma forest.
