= Santimamiñe =

Cave and archaeological site with prehistoric paintings in Spain

Coordinates: 43°20′48″N 2°38′12″W

Santimamiñe cave
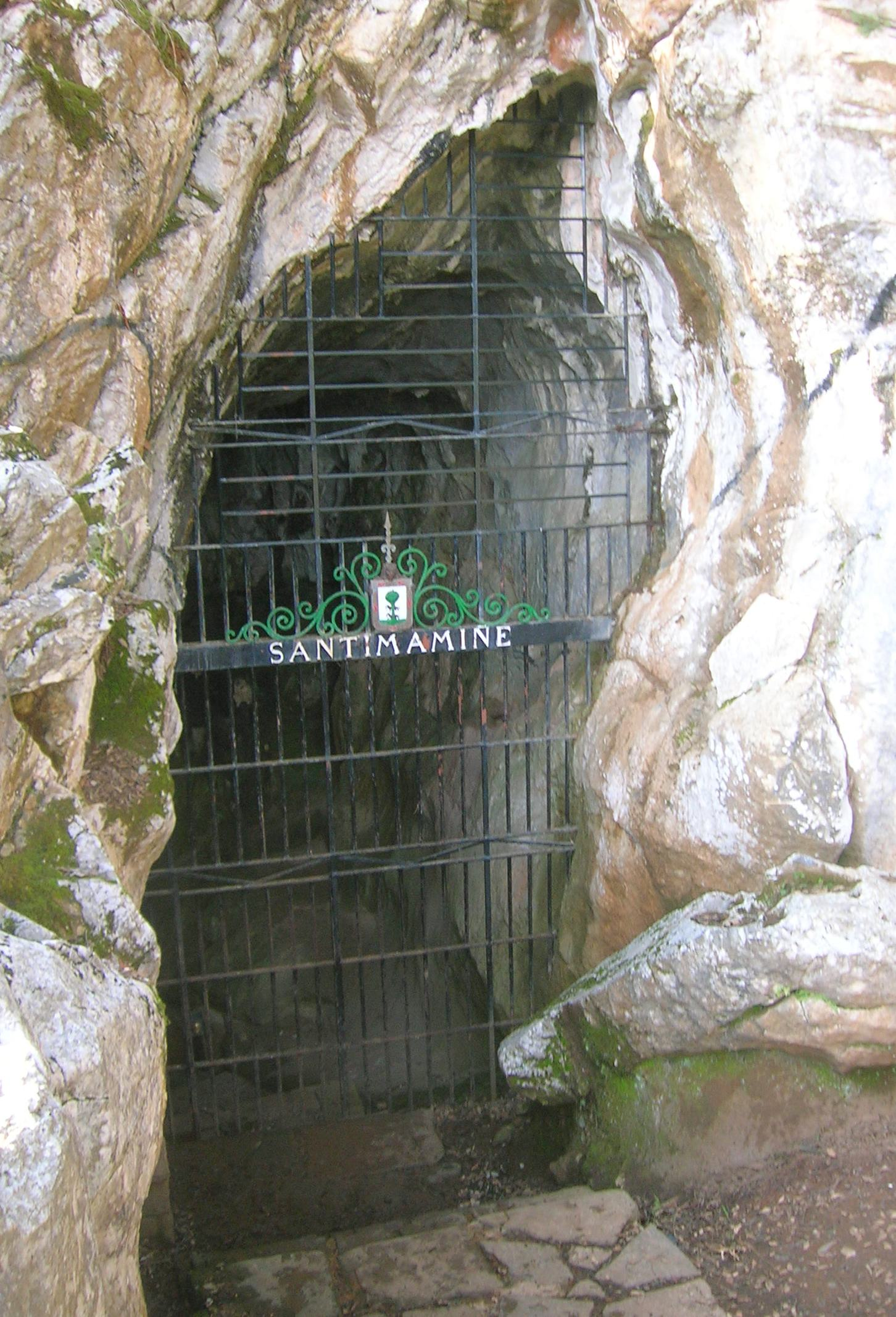
- Entrance to the cave
- Interactive map of Santimamiñe cave
- Location: Kortezubi (Biscay), Spain

UNESCO World Heritage Site
- Official name: Santimamiñe
- Type: Cultural
- Criteria: i, iii
- Designated: 1985 (9th session)
- Part of: Cave of Altamira and Paleolithic Cave Art of Northern Spain
- Reference no.: 310-016
- Region: Europe and North America

Spanish Cultural Heritage
- Official name: Cueva de Santimamiñe
- Type: Non-movable
- Criteria: Monument
- Designated: 17 July 1984
- Reference no.: RI-51-0005165

Santimamiñe cave, Kortezubi, Biscay, Basque Country, Spain, is one of the most important archaeological sites of the Basque Country, including a nearly complete sequence from the Middle Paleolithic to the Iron Age.

Its complete sequence includes the following cultures:

- Mousterian
- Chatelperronian
- Aurignacian
- Gravettian
- Solutrean
- Magdalenian
- Azilian

Plus unclassified remains of the Neolithic, Chalcolithic, Bronze and Iron ages.

It is best known for its mural paintings of the Magdalenian period, depicting bisons, horses, goats and deer. It was discovered by children in 1917.

Its excellent location over the Urdaibai estuary was probably most important in its continued habitation, first by Neanderthals and later by Homo sapiens. It is located on the west side of mount Ereñusarre/Ereñozar.

Between 1982 and 1985, local artist Agustín Ibarrola painted on the trees of the nearby Oma forest.

Since 2008, it is one of the caves included as a World Heritage Site within "Cave of Altamira and Paleolithic Cave Art of Northern Spain".

== See also ==
- Art of the Upper Paleolithic
- List of Stone Age art
