= Sierra Salvada =

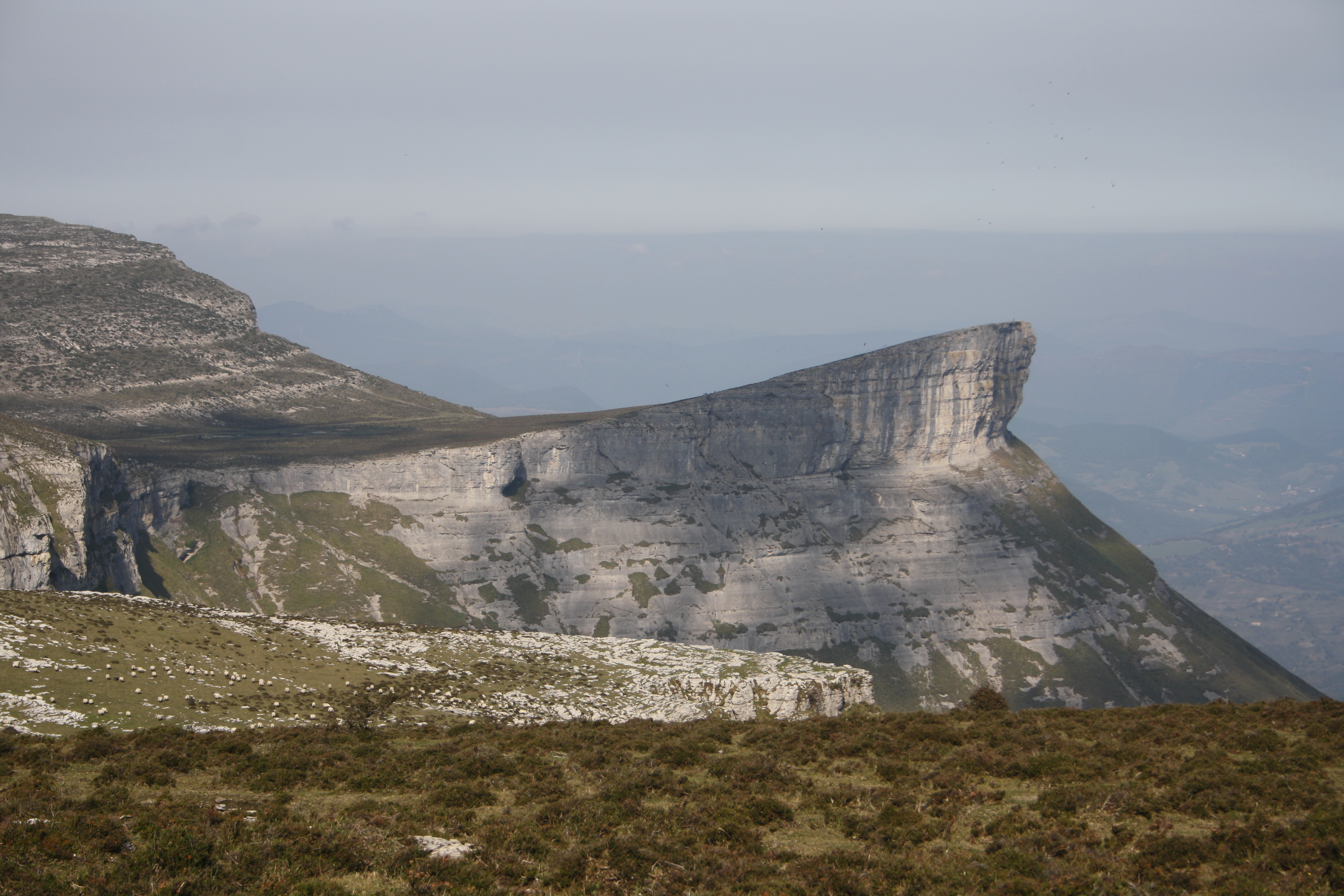
- Sierra Salvada and the Ungino mountain peak

Highest point
- Peak: Eskutxi
- Elevation: 1,180 m (3,870 ft)

Dimensions
- Length: 25 km (16 mi)
- Area: 100 km^{2} (39 mi^{2})

Geography
- Country: Spain
- Province: Álava

Geology
- Rock type: Alpine Orogeny

Sierra Salvada (Basque: Gorobel) is a mountain range situated to the northwest of Burgos (Spain), and it is also part of Alava and Orduña (an enclave on Biscay). The southern slope of this mountain range, whose rivers flow to the mediterranean sea, is included in the province of Burgos. However, the north slope is part of the Autonomous Community of the Basque Country. The rivers of this area of Sierra Salvada flow to the Cantabrian coast.

Sierra Salvada is famous because of its peculiar shape, created by its north steep slope, 25 km (16 mi) in length, and because of its biodiversity, That is why Sierra Salvada is considered a Special Protection Area (SPA), in order to protect the different species of birds.

== History ==
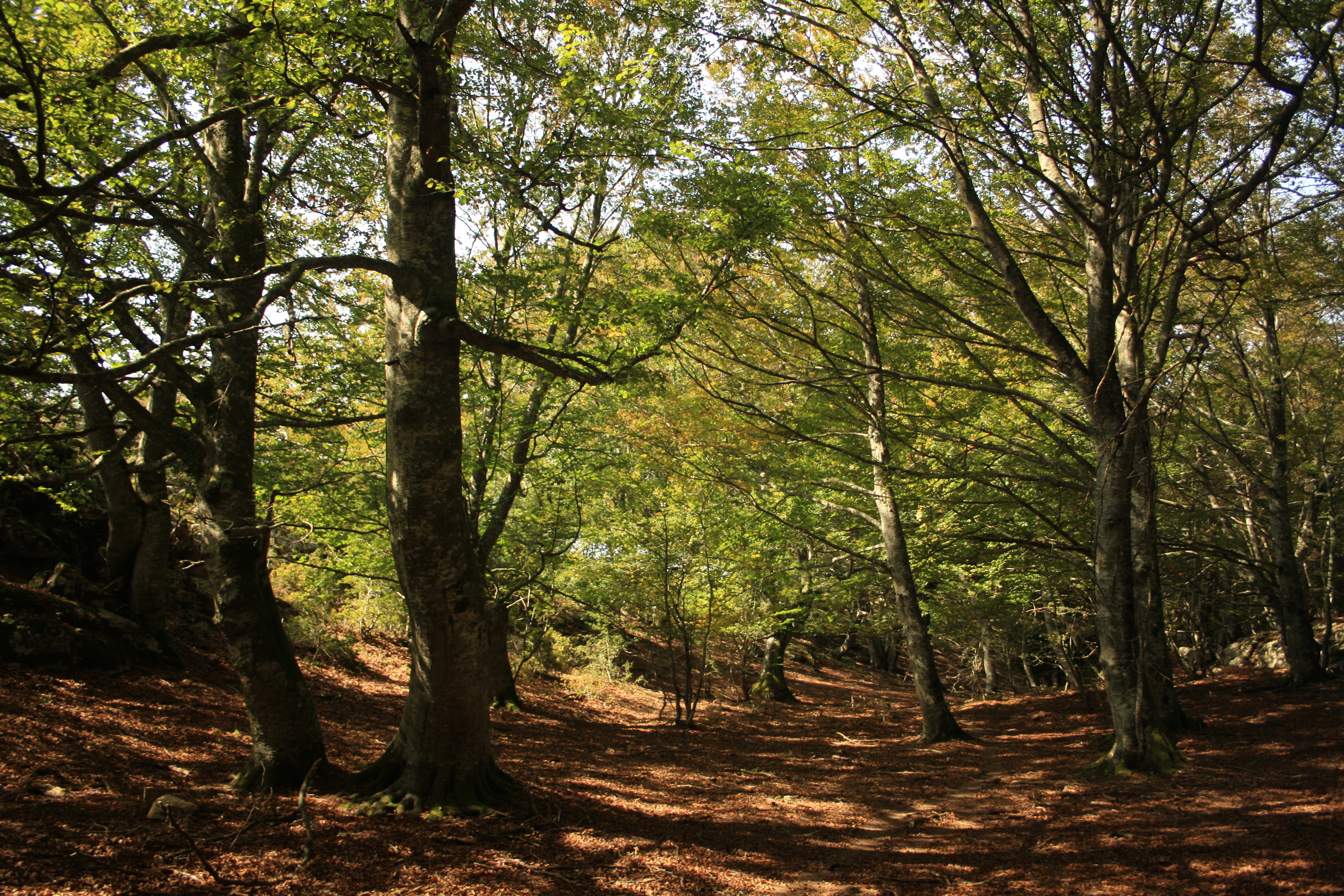
A beech forest in Sierra Salvada.

This mountain range has been very important between the 16th and 18th centuries, as a communication way between Castilla and the Cantabrian. It is considered an important trade route that connected the Northern Peninsula, and therefore, it was very significant on the commercial communications of the northern area.

Sierra Salvada is known through its limestone area and the speleological researches done there by the caving groups. Among the more than 350 caves located, there is the most famous one, The System of the Beech Forest of Ponata, cavity located and explored by the Speleological Group of Alava (GEA) between 1983 and 2000. This famous cave has 45 kilometres (28 mi) length mapped. Other caves of this mountain range are the Pozalagua System, with 13 kilometres (8 mi) length (explored and mapped by the Speleological Group of Alava and the Edelweiss Caving Group) and the San Miguel or the Old Cave.

== Mountains in Sierra Salvada ==
- Urieta – 1,133 m (3,717 ft)
- Aro – 1,127 m (3,698 ft)
- Ungino – 1,105 m (3,625 ft)
- Tologorri – 1,066 m (3,497 ft)
- Bedarbide – 1,041 m (3,415 ft)
- Solaiera – 1,039 m (3,409 ft)
- Txarlazo – 927 m (3,041 ft)
- Arando – 943 m (3,094 ft)

== See also ==
- Physical geography of Euskal Herria
- Speleology
- Basque Mountains
