= Gautegiz Arteaga =

Gautegiz Arteaga Gautéguiz de Arteaga
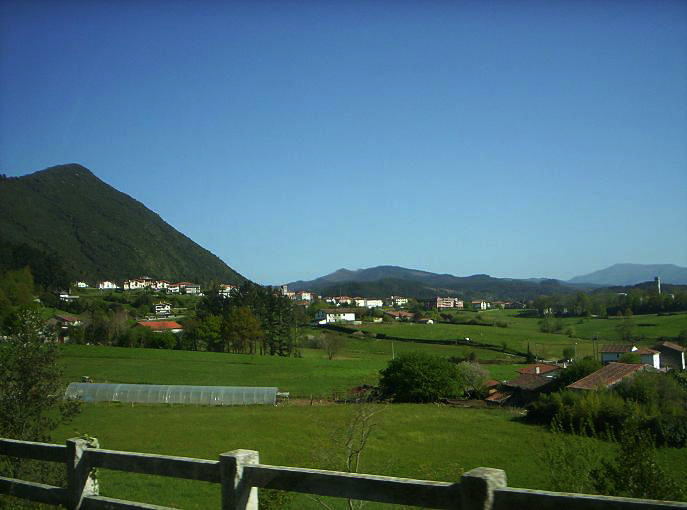

- Coat of arms

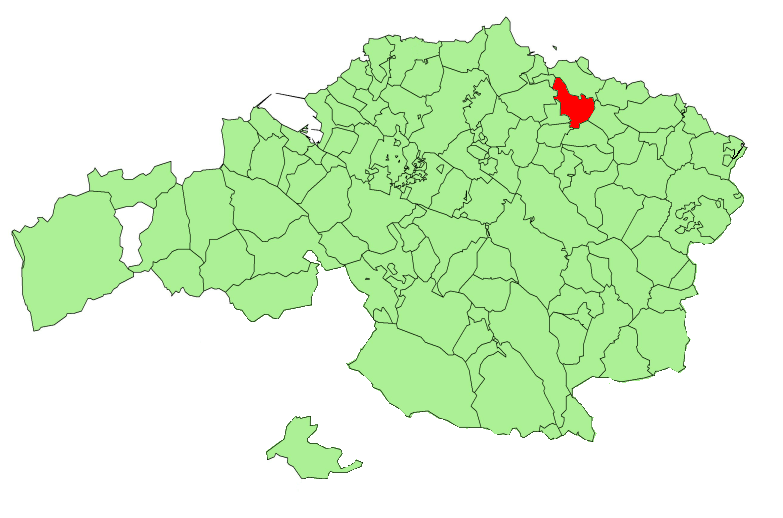
- Location in Biscay

- Location in Spain
- Coordinates: 43°22′5″N 2°39′8″W
- Kintra: Spain
- Autonomous community: País Vasco
- Province: Biscay
- Comarca: Busturialdea

Area
  - Total: 13.57 km^{2} (5.24 sq mi)
- Elevation: 45 m (148 ft)

Population (2025-01-01)
  - Total: 866
  - Density: 63.8/km^{2} (165/sq mi)
- Postal code: 48314

Gautegiz Arteaga (Spanish: Gautéguiz de Arteaga) is a town in Biscay, in the northern Spanish autonomous community of the Basque Country.

It is located on the right bank of the Urdaibai estuary.

Its most emblematic building is the Arteaga Tower, a medieval castle rebuilt in the 19th century for the French empress Eugénie de Montijo.

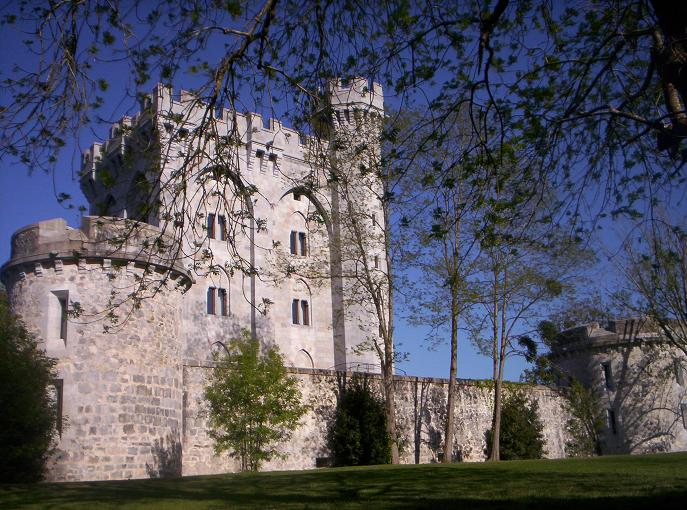
Arteaga Tower
