= Agustín Ibarrola =

Spanish painter and sculptor (1930–2023)

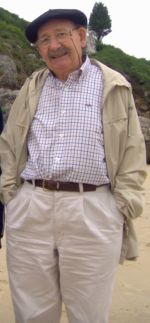

Agustín Ibarrola (18 August 1930 – 17 November 2023) was a Spanish painter and sculptor.

== Biography ==
Ibarrola was born in Basauri, Biscay, Basque Autonomous Community, Spain. In 1948, the Delegation of Biscay and the city council of Bilbao granted him a scholarship to study in Madrid, where he lived until 1955.

Ibarrola had various exhibitions in Spain and in 1955 was transferred to Paris. In 1957, he was a member of the group Equipment 57 with Duarte, Serrano, and others. This was in the time of constructivism.

Due to his communist militancy, he was imprisoned for several years in the prison of Burgos. In 1963, when an exhibition of his work in London was mounted, a critic compared his work with Goya's The Disasters of War.

In the 1980s he began sculpting; this inspired him to create the Oma Forest near Guernica, which is perhaps his best known work. The piece is currently being relocated to the nearby Basobarri Forest due to a fungal infection destroying the original painted trees.

Ibarrola's work combined the Basque spirit with the social commitment of the humblest workers, people who tend towards expressionism.

One of his last and most spectacular works was Cubes of Memory, in the port of Llanes.

In later years he was tied to the founder of the platform ¡Basta Ya!, a civic group fighting against terrorism in the Basque Country. Due to his bitter opposition to ETA, a group proscribed as terrorist by the Spanish state, Ibarrola was threatened by ETA.

Ibarrola was awarded the Medal of the Order of the Constitutional Merit.

Ibarrola was known for his land art. One of his most famous works is Ibarrola's forest, where he painted many trees with a lot of colours creating a beautiful combination of nature and colours.

Agustín Ibarrola died on 17 November 2023, at the age of 93.
