= Euskalmet =

- Established: 19 June 1990 (35 years ago)
- Types: government agency, meteorological service
- Country: Spain

Euskalmet (in Basque: Euskal Meteorologia Agentzia, English: Basque Agency of Meteorology) is the Basque service of meteorology, established in 1990.
