= Kortezubi =

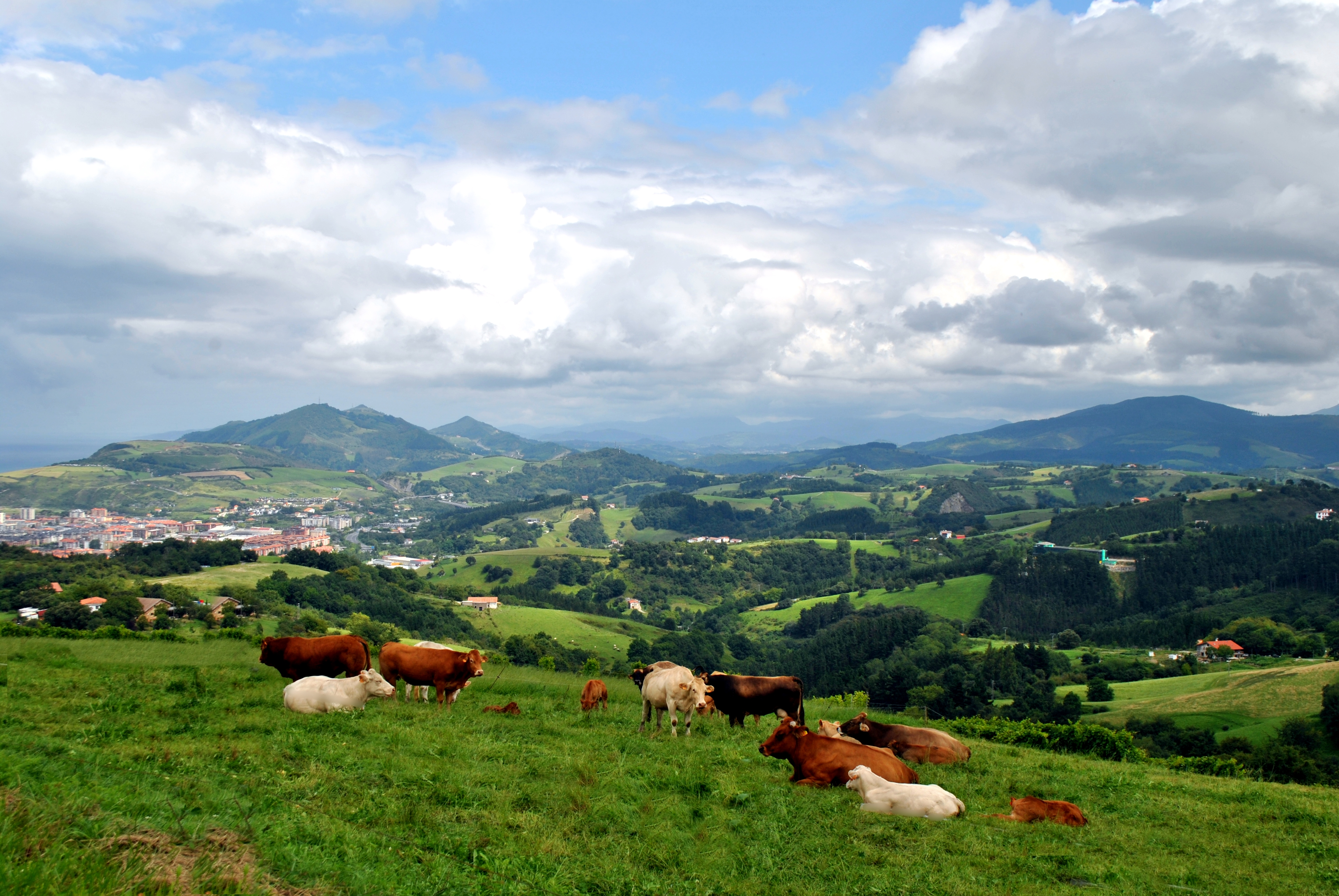
- View of Kortezubi

- Coat of arms

- Location of Kortezubi within the Basque Country
- Coordinates: 43°20′27″N 2°39′18″W
- Country: Spain
- Autonomous community: Basque Country
- Province: Biscay
- Comarca: Busturialdea

Government
  - Mayor: Domingo Bilbao Etxebarria

Area
  - Total: 12 km^{2} (4.6 sq mi)
- Elevation: 13 m (43 ft)

Population (2025-01-01)
  - Total: 447
  - Density: 37/km^{2} (96/sq mi)
- Time zone: UTC+1 (CET)
  - Summer (DST): UTC+2 (CEST)
- Postal code: 48315
- Website: www.kortezubi.eus

Kortezubi is a town and municipality located in the province of Biscay, in the Basque Autonomous Community, northern Spain. It has 444 inhabitants.
