= Urdaibai estuary =

Biosphere reserve in Biscay, Basque Country, Spain

Coordinates: 43°19′56″N 2°40′19″W

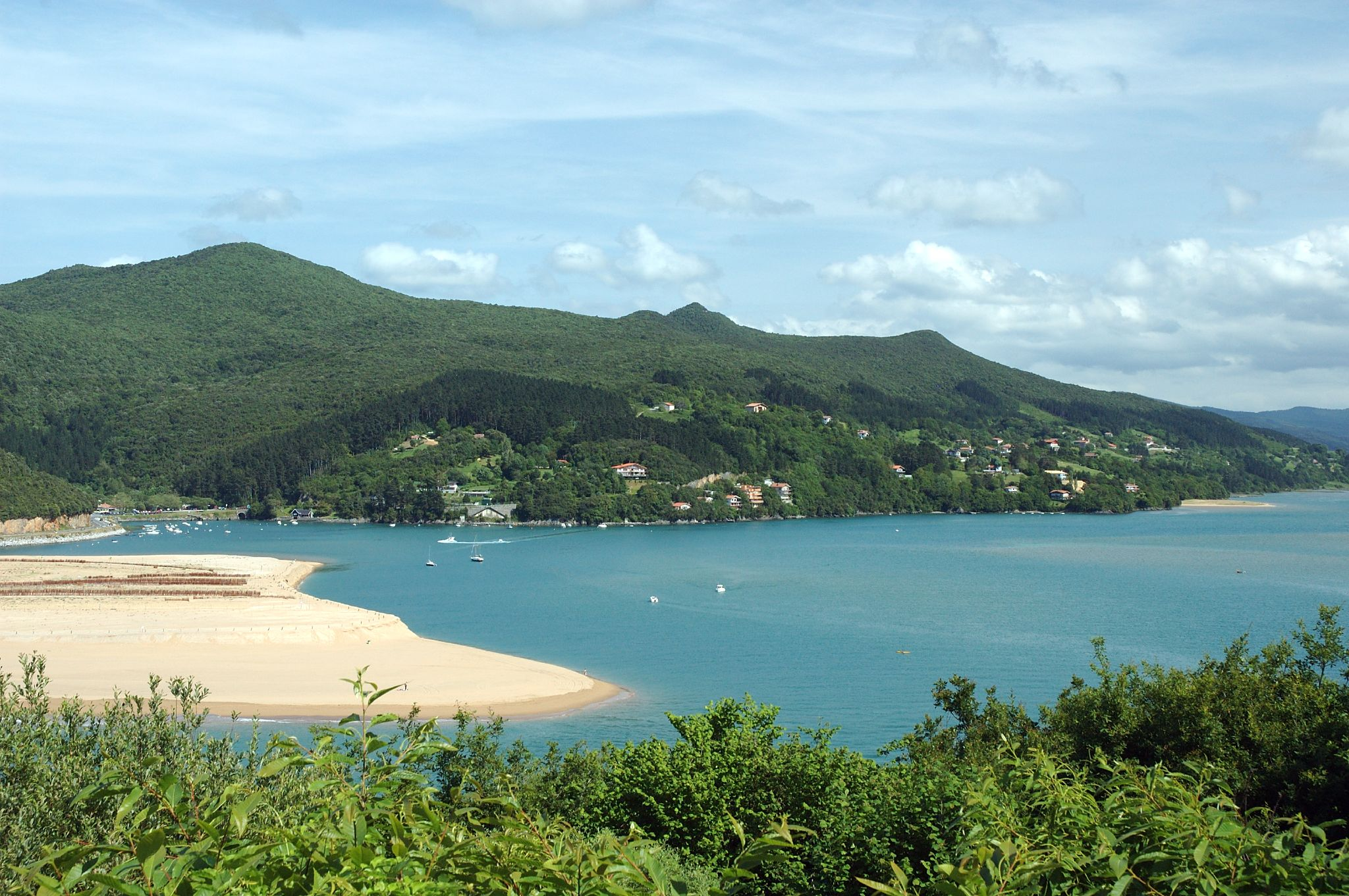
The Urdaibai estuary

The Urdaibai estuary is a natural region and a Biosphere Reserve of Biscay, Basque Country, Spain. It is also referred as Mundaka or Gernika estuary.

Urdaibai is located on the Bay of Biscay coast, in the north of the Iberian Peninsula. Urdaibai covers an area of 220 km^{2} (85 sq mi) with some 45,000 inhabitants, most of them concentrated in the towns of Bermeo and Gernika. The territory is characterized by a hydrographic basin of small streams that merge in a great salt marsh surrounded by high sheer cliffs. The surrounding countryside is occupied by meadowland, oak groves, leafy woods and specially by plantations of fast-growing conifers (Pinus radiata). The coastal landscape is covered with Cantabrian woods of Holm Oak and Strawberry Trees.

In Urdaibai have been described 615 species of vascular plants and 318 species of vertebrates, 245 of which are birds.

The area contains remnants of the Prehistoric, Roman and the Middle Ages. Particularly notable is the Santimamiñe cave, which has yielded archeological artifacts from the Mousterian (Middle Paleolithic Age) to the Iron Age.

The economy is based on metallurgy, fishing, farming and forestry. An important tourist sector is based on the quality of the local beaches. Mundaka is especially appealing for surfers around the world.

== Description ==
The Oca river rises in the Oiz mountain and finishes in the Cantabric sea. The coast is rugged and with high cliffs and some islands, of which the most important is Ízaro Island.

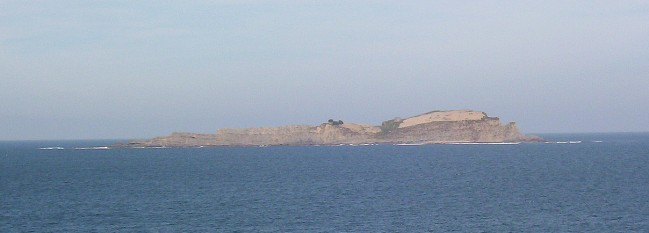
Izaro island

The development of forests reserves has allowed a degree of environmental conservation, which gives this area the most diverse landscape of the Basque Country.

== Climate and temperature ==
The area of Urdaibai has an Atlantic climate, wet and warm and regulated by the sea (with temperature between 9 and 19 °C). The annual rainfall is heavy; the rainiest months are November and December, although it is distributed during all the year. Precipitation is generally rain. Because of the influence of the sea, the temperature is moderate during the year (the average temperature is 13/14 degrees).

== Landscape ==
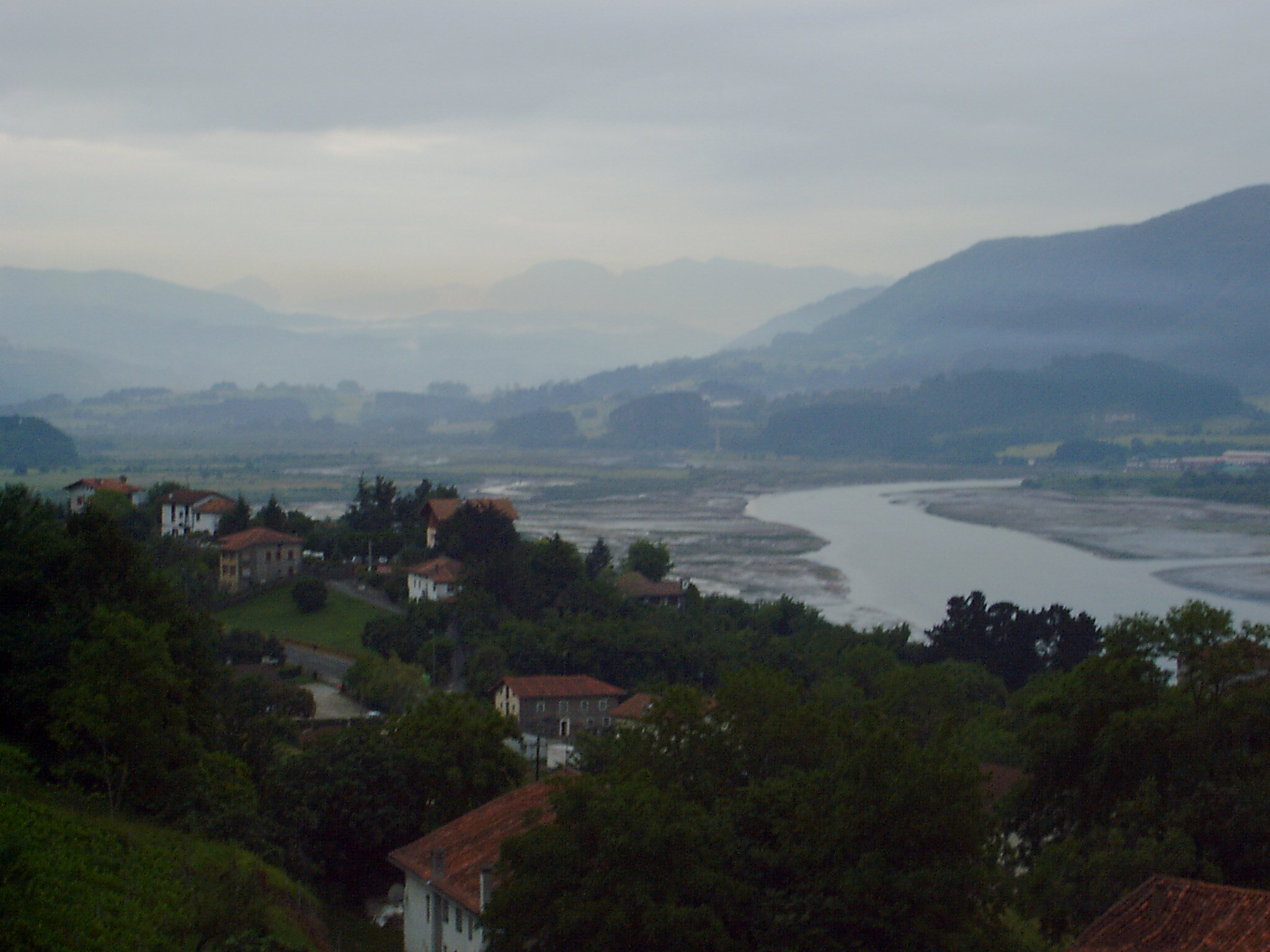
Oka's marshes

The landscape is formed with mountains, sea and sands, which are produced by the sediments of the estuary, where marshes are flooded by the tides. The rivers Laga and Artigas go directly to the sea. The first ends in Laga's beach, and the second one creates a small valley between the Sollube mountain and Bermeo.

=== Estuary ===
The estuary, together with Santoña's natural park, is arguably the most important wetland in the Iberian Peninsula. The estuary is the heart of the Biosphere Reserve, which is a habitat for a wide variety of migratory and resident birds. As regards migrating birds, the attractions of the biosphere reserve, and in particular the Urdaibai Bird Center in Gautegiz Arteaga, are promoted to birdwatchers as part of the international "Bird Flyway" project.

The interior is defined by the mountains, and on their slopes are forest plantations of Monterey pine used to make wood. There also are a few forests with local trees, such as oak; and near the coast are plantations of Eucalyptus. On the central area, the land becomes flat and it is used in agriculture. This landscape is supported by livestock and agricultural development. The estuary extends from Guernica to Busturia, and a 5 km canal has been made in order not to dry up.

=== Mountains ===
The slopes of the mountains are covered by forests of Holm Oaks down to the sea's edge. The limestone nature of the bedrock has led to a kast system, where numerous caves and galleries may be found.

=== Coast ===
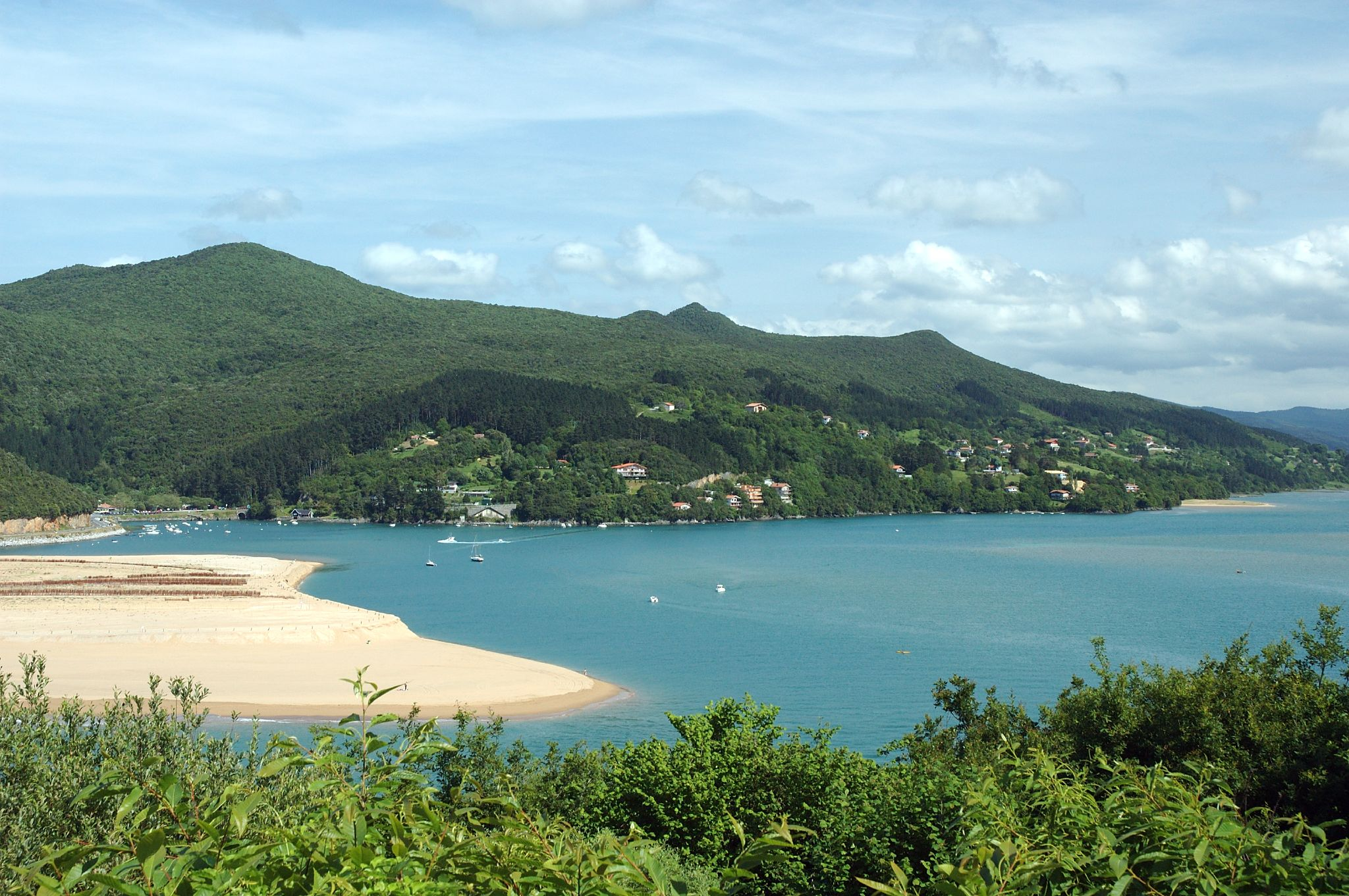
Laida's beach

To the north, at the mouth of the estuary, the sands of Sukarrieta and Laida line the shore of the Oka River.

To the west are the sands of Santa Katalina, Murgoa and Lamera. The Murgoa has a slope of a hundred meters, forming places like Trankilpunta and Kargaderua. After Bermeo are found the cliffs of Talape and Tonpoi. In the flysch that is made at the foot of the cliff can be found the "Arribolak", large stones which have been released from the wall and later rounded by the sea. To the east the sea stops being rough.

== Flora and fauna ==
=== Protected areas ===
The biosphere reserve was designated in 1984.

=== Flora ===
The flora that is developed in Urdabai, is clearly an atlantic base. There are a lot of meadows, oak groves, lush forests and especially plenty of Monterey pines. The coastal area is covered by cantabrian forests. The vegetable world that can be found here, is formed by 615 species of plants. Human activity has substantially modified the space, but the agricultural works have allowed the recuperation of original vegetation. The vegetation has, mainly in the marsh, a degree of singularity because of the specialization and also and its particular appearance. However, at the same time it has a high grade of diversity originated by the salinity. The area of Urdaibai is composed by different environments, each of which has its own vegetation and animals that create their own ecosystem.

- The coast
- Mountain on the left side
- Middle tract of the Oka and its tributaries
- Closed valleys from the Oka
- Karstic area and the environment on the right side
- The Guernica and Mundaka valleys

=== Fauna ===
The big variety of ecosystems that can be found in the Urdaibai make possible the faunistic wealth, with 318 species of vertebrates, apart from the number of different birds.

- Fish: in the head of the river there are trout, eels and loachs mainly, while in the middle we found barbels.
- Amphibians: although they are too much in danger, many salamanders, toads and different kind of frogs are common in there.
- Birds: the birds are the most important part of fauna in Urdaibai. Most of them emigrate from Europe to Africa and in the other way. Orueta wetland, located in the heart of Urdaibai, is a suitable place to observe the ornithological wealth. Moreover, Urdaibai Bird Center, an investigation center is available to visit and enjoy the Orueta wetland. Some of them are, black storks, herons, eagles.
- Mammals: in this group we can difference little and big animals. The first ones are, for example: moles, shrews, dormice...

== Geography ==
There are four distinct areas of interest in the reserve:

- The estuary.
- The shores.
- Holm Oak areas.
- Archeologic areas.

Geographically three distinct areas can be distinguished: The mountains, the marshes and the coast with its cliffs and beaches.

== Human occupation ==
The population of the Busturialdea, which practically coincides with that of the protected Biosphere Reserve of Uradibai area is about 45,000 inhabitants are mainly located (80%), in the towns of Guernica Luno and Bermeo. Human presence has been ongoing in the area since prehistoric times, having testimonies based on findings from the Upper Paleolithic. Notable Roman remains, especially disrupted the necropolis with burials from the first century until the nineteenth century found in the church of San Martin de Tours of Forua.

The two largest centres of population are the municipalities of Bermeo and Guernica. Bermeo is a village founded in 1236 and one of the most important fishing ports of Biscay. It is the most populous town in the region and was the capital of the Lordship of Biscay from 1476 until 1602. Guernica is formed by the union of the historical town of Guernica with Porch of Luno. Guernica, founded in 1366, is the historical seat of the General Assembly of Vizcaya and it is the House of Meetings with Tree of Guernica, a symbol of Basque privileges. It is also famous worldwide for the bombing suffered in the Spanish Civil War of 1936, the subject of Picasso's painting 'Guernica'.

The remaining populations are small centers that cater to the historical political demarcation of the Lordship of Biscay in which the call Level Earth was organized porches. Mundaca and Elanchove are coastal populations, the first of which is at the mouth of the Oka. Both populations have a fishing origin although the current economic engine is tourism.

The village is the residential unit and farming and ranching in which has traditionally been the livelihood of the region of Busturialdea. This type of interaction between man and the environment has produced the landscape of Atlantic countryside which makes up much of the area of Urdaibai. Within the territory of the Urdaibai there is a great variety and richness of villages, all of them examples of rural architecture and of great ethnographic value.

The economy is based on metallurgy, fishing, agriculture and forestry. There is also a tourism sector, focusing mainly on local beaches and natural values of the reserve. Mundaca is especially attractive for surfers from around the world.

== Maps ==
Location of the Urdaibai Biosphere Reserve in Biscay.

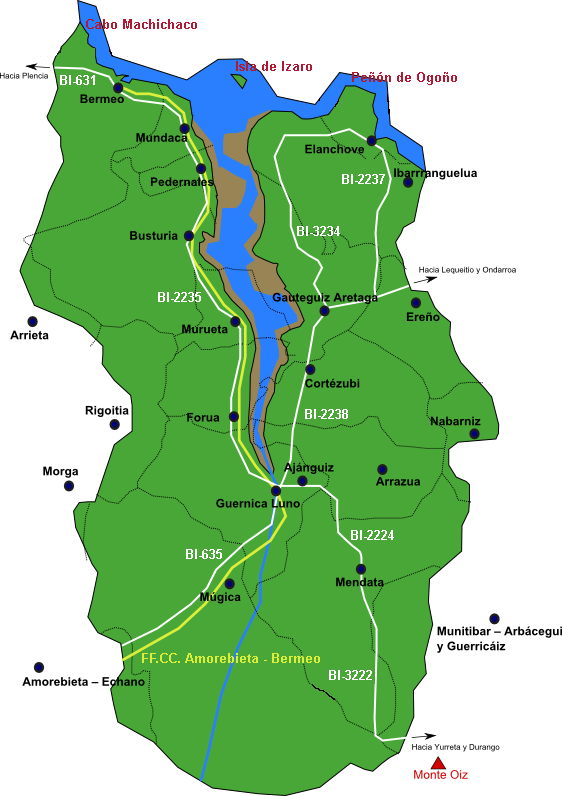
Map of the reserve.

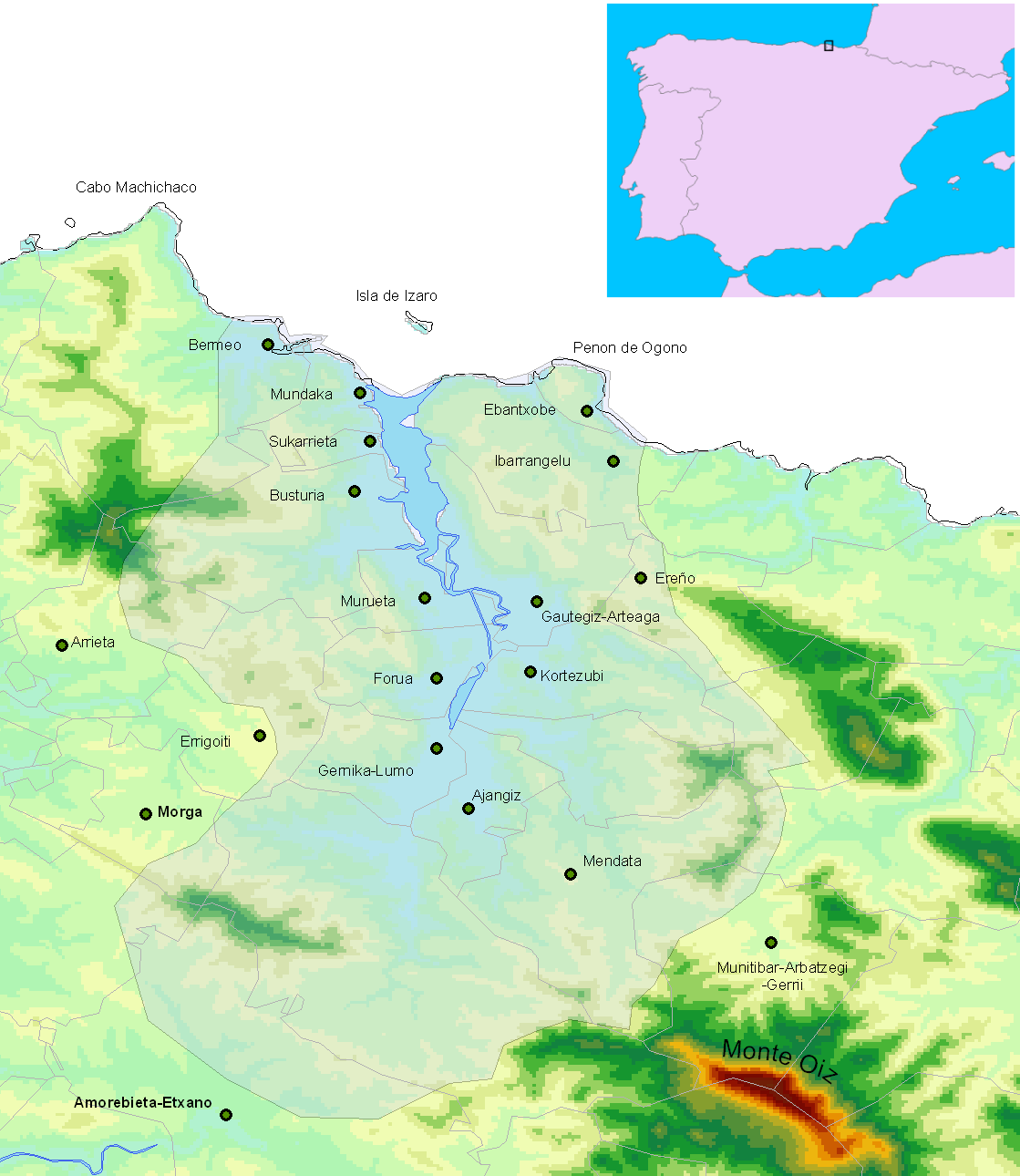
Physical map.
