= Amedeo Modigliani =

Italian painter and sculptor (1884–1920)

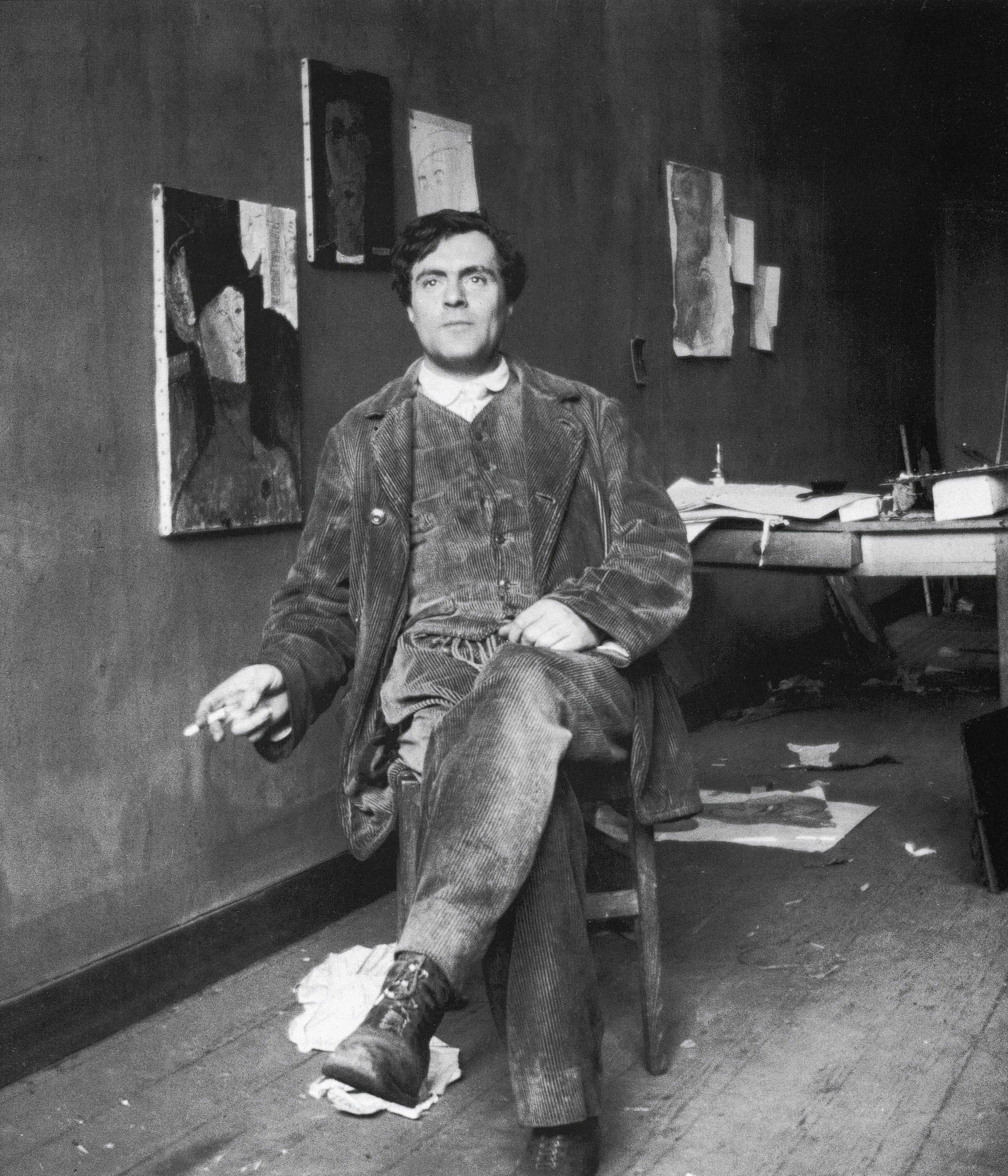
- Modigliani c. 1918
- Born: 12 July 1884; Livorno, Kingdom of Italy
- Died: 24 January 1920 (aged 35); Paris, France
- Resting place: Père Lachaise Cemetery
- Education: Accademia di Belle Arti di Firenze
- Known for: Painting, sculpture
- Notable work: Redheaded Girl in Evening Dress; Madame Pompadour; Nu couché; Jeanne Hébuterne in Red Shawl
- Movement: School of Paris
- Partner: Jeanne Hébuterne (1917–1920, his death)
- Children: 4, including Jeanne Modigliani

Amedeo Clemente Modigliani (US: /ˌmoʊdiːlˈjɑːni/; Italian: [ameˈdɛːo modiʎˈʎaːni]; 12 July 1884 – 24 January 1920) was an Italian painter and sculptor of the École de Paris who worked mainly in France. He is known for portraits and nudes in a modern style characterised by a surreal elongation of faces, necks, and figures — works that were not received well during his lifetime, but later became much sought after. Modigliani was born and spent his youth in Italy, where he studied the art of antiquity and the Renaissance. In 1906, he moved to Paris, where he came into contact with such artists as Pablo Picasso and Constantin Brâncuși. By 1912, Modigliani was exhibiting highly stylised sculptures with Cubists of the Section d'Or group at the Salon d'Automne.

Modigliani's oeuvre includes paintings and drawings. From 1909 to 1914, he devoted himself mainly to sculpture. His main subjects were portraits and full figures, both in images and in the sculpture. Modigliani had little success while alive but after his death achieved great popularity. He died of tubercular meningitis, at the age of 35, in Paris.

== Family and early life ==
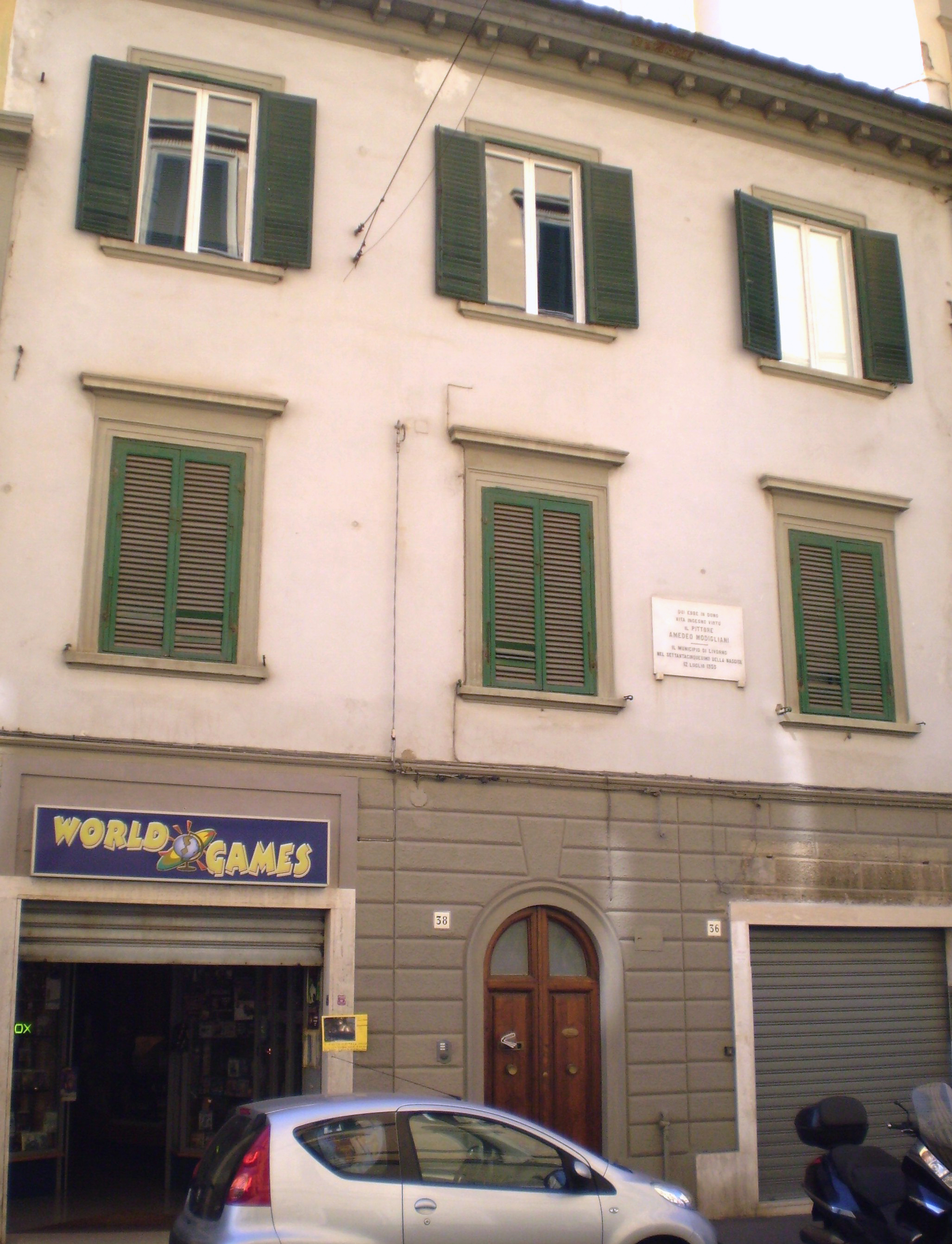
Modigliani's birthplace in Livorno

Modigliani was born into a Sephardic Jewish family in Livorno, Italy. A port city, Livorno had long served as a refuge for those persecuted for their religion, and was home to a large Jewish community. His maternal great-great-grandfather, Solomon Garsin, had immigrated to Livorno in the 18th century as a refugee.

Modigliani's mother, Eugénie Garsin, born and raised in Marseille, was descended from an intellectual, scholarly family of Sephardic ancestry that for generations had lived along the Mediterranean coastline. Fluent in many languages, her ancestors were authorities on sacred Jewish texts and had founded a school of Talmudic studies. Family legend traced the family lineage to the 17th-century Dutch philosopher Baruch Spinoza, but this is indeed a legend, since the philosopher had no children. The family business was money lending, with branches in Livorno, Marseille, Tunis, and London, though their fortunes ebbed and flowed.

Modigliani's father, Flaminio, was a member of an Italian Jewish family of successful businessmen and entrepreneurs. While not as culturally sophisticated as the Garsins, they knew how to invest in and develop thriving business endeavours. When the Garsin and Modigliani families announced the engagement of their children, Flaminio was a wealthy young mining engineer. He managed the mine in Sardinia and also managed the almost 30,000 acres (12,141 ha) of timberland the family owned.

A reversal in fortune occurred to this prosperous family in 1883. An economic downturn in the price of metal plunged the Modiglianis into bankruptcy. Ever resourceful, Modigliani's mother used her social contacts to establish a school and, along with her two sisters, made the school into a successful enterprise.

Amedeo Modigliani was the fourth child, whose birth coincided with the disastrous financial collapse of his father's business interests. Amedeo's birth saved the family from ruin; according to an ancient law, creditors could not seize the bed of a pregnant woman or a mother with a newborn child. The bailiffs entered the family's home just as Eugénie went into labour; the family protected their most valuable assets by piling them on top of her.

Modigliani had a close relationship with his mother, who taught him at home until he was 10. Beset with health problems after an attack of pleurisy when he was about 11, a few years later he developed a case of typhoid fever. When he was 16 he was taken ill again and contracted the tuberculosis that would later claim his life. After Modigliani recovered from the second bout of pleurisy, his mother took him on a tour of southern Italy: Naples, Capri, Rome and Amalfi, then north to Florence and Venice.

His mother was, in many ways, instrumental in his ability to pursue art as a vocation. When he was 11 years of age, she had noted in her diary: "The child's character is still so unformed that I cannot say what I think of it. He behaves like a spoiled child, but he does not lack intelligence. We shall have to wait and see what is inside this chrysalis. Perhaps an artist?"

== Art student years ==
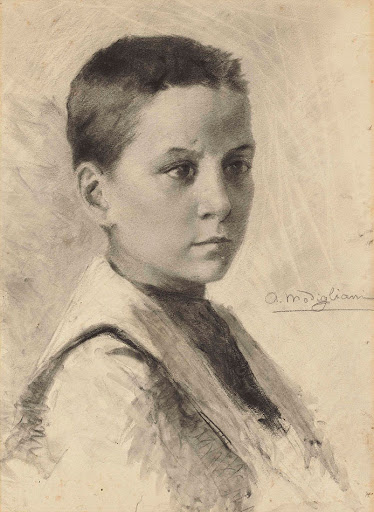
Self portrait, 1899, private collection

Modigliani is known to have drawn and painted from a very early age, and thought himself "already a painter", his mother wrote, even before beginning formal studies. Despite her misgivings that launching him on a course of studying art would impinge upon his other studies, his mother indulged the young Modigliani's passion for the subject.

At the age of fourteen, while sick with typhoid fever, he raved in his delirium that he wanted, above all else, to see the paintings in the Palazzo Pitti and the Uffizi in Florence. As Livorno's local museum housed only a sparse few paintings by the Italian Renaissance masters, the tales he had heard about the great works held in Florence intrigued him, and it was a source of considerable despair to him, in his sickened state, that he might never get the chance to view them in person. His mother promised that she would take him to Florence herself, the moment he was recovered. Not only did she fulfil this promise, but she also undertook to enroll him with the best painting master in Livorno, Guglielmo Micheli.

=== Micheli and the Macchiaioli ===
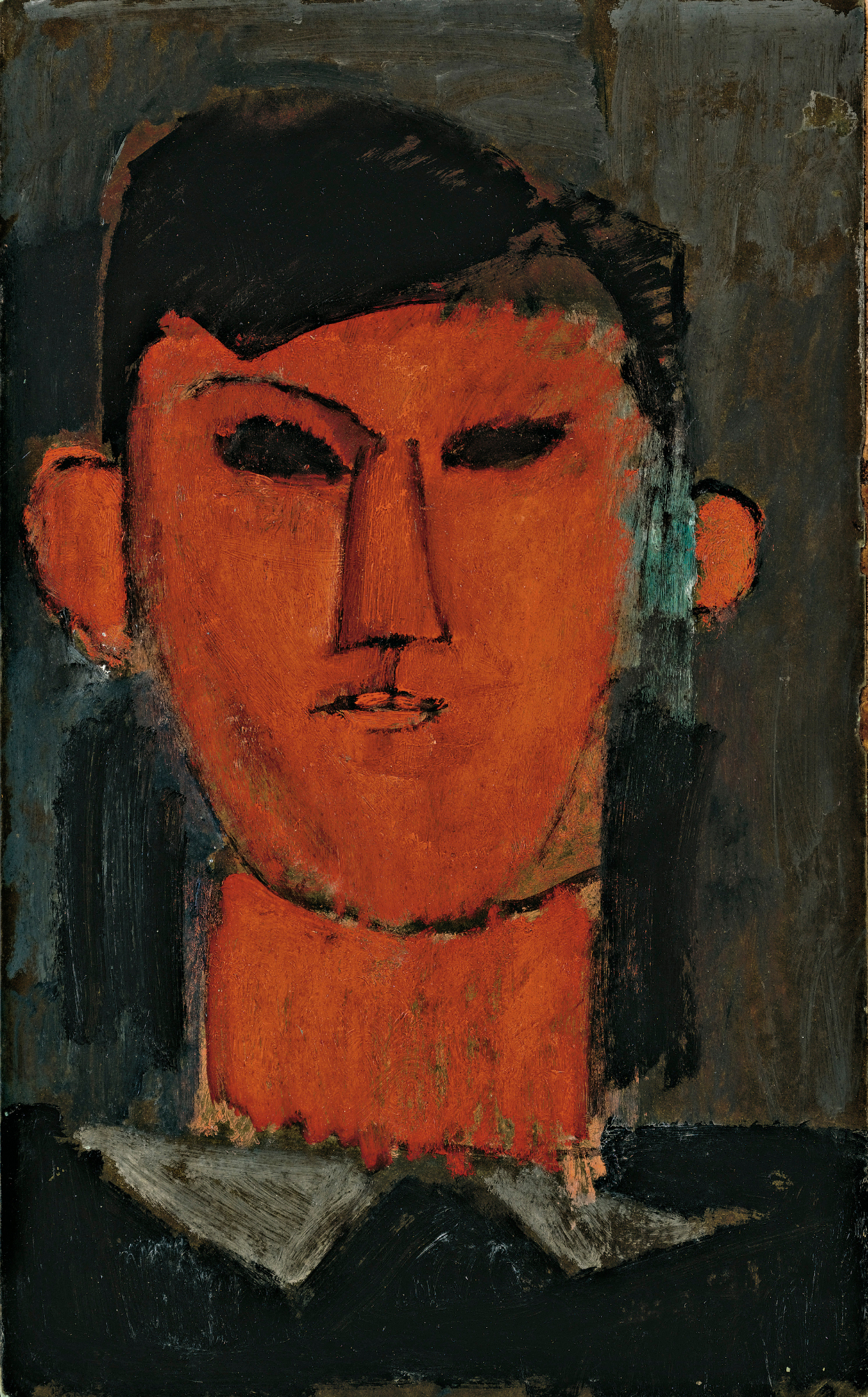
Portrait of Pablo Picasso, 1915, private collection

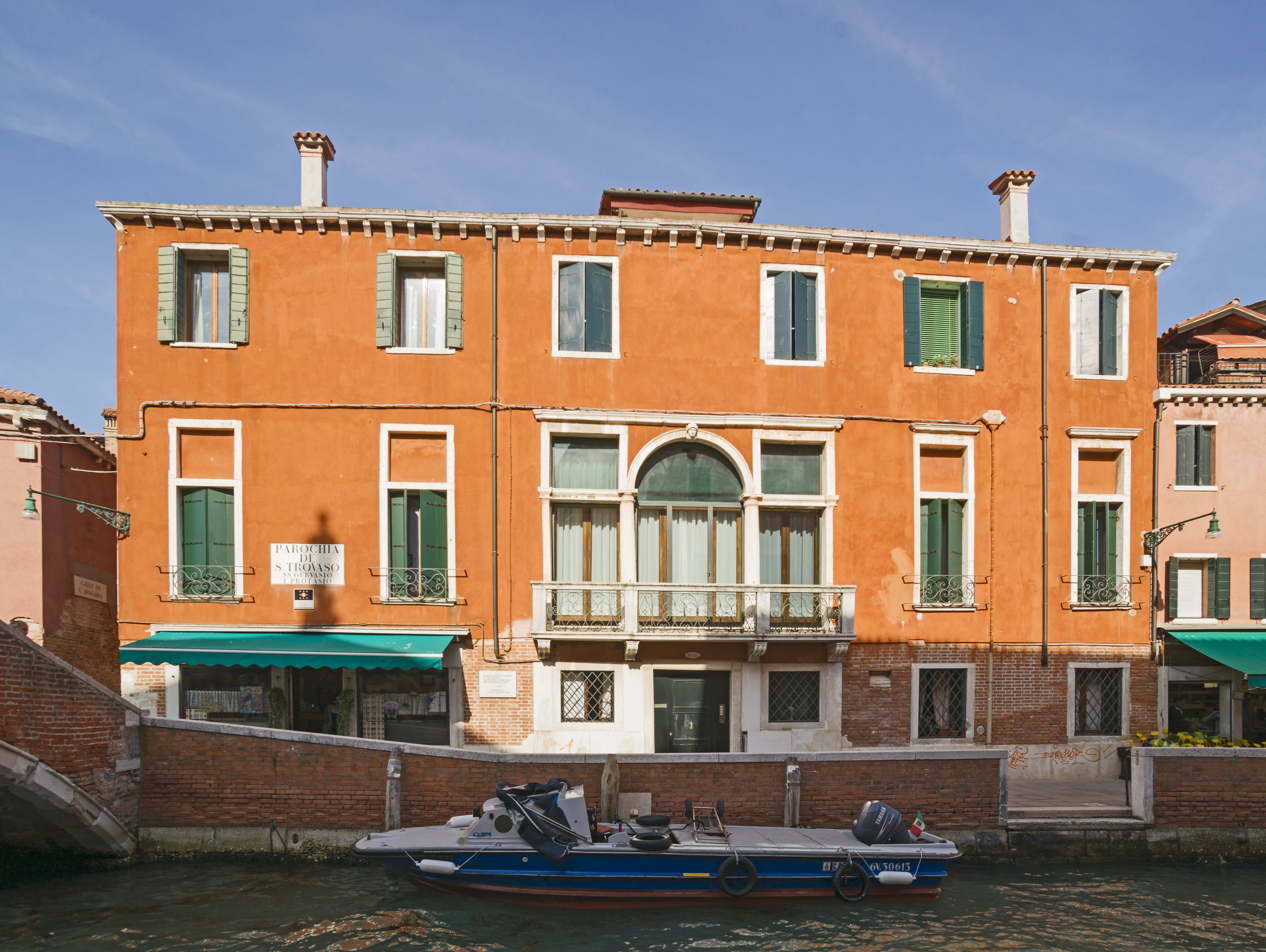
His home in Venice

Modigliani worked in Micheli's Art School from 1898 to 1900. Among his colleagues in that studio would have been Llewelyn Lloyd, Giulio Cesare Vinzio, Manlio Martinelli, Gino Romiti, Renato Natali, and Oscar Ghiglia. Here, his earliest formal artistic instruction took place in an atmosphere steeped in a study of the styles and themes of 19th-century Italian art. In his earliest Parisian work, traces of this influence, and that of his studies of Renaissance art, can still be seen. His nascent work was influenced by such Parisian artists as Giovanni Boldini and Toulouse-Lautrec.

Modigliani showed great promise while with Micheli, and ceased his studies only when he was forced to, by the onset of tuberculosis.

In 1901, whilst in Rome, Modigliani admired the work of Domenico Morelli, a painter of dramatic religious and literary scenes. Morelli had served as an inspiration for a group of iconoclasts who were known by the title "the Macchiaioli" (from macchia —"dash of colour", or, more derogatively, "stain"), and Modigliani had already been exposed to the influences of the Macchiaioli. This localised landscape movement reacted against the bourgeois stylings of the academic genre painters. While sympathetically connected to (and actually pre-dating) the French Impressionists, the Macchiaioli did not make the same impact upon international art culture as did the contemporaries and followers of Monet, and are today largely forgotten outside Italy.

Modigliani's connection with the movement was through Guglielmo Micheli, his first art teacher. Micheli was not only a Macchiaiolo himself, but had been a pupil of the famous Giovanni Fattori, a founder of the movement. Micheli's work, however, was so fashionable and the genre so commonplace that the young Modigliani reacted against it, preferring to ignore the obsession with landscape that, as with French Impressionism, characterised the movement. Micheli also tried to encourage his pupils to paint en plein air, but Modigliani never really got a taste for this style of working, sketching in cafés, but preferring to paint indoors, and especially in his own studio. Even when compelled to paint landscapes (three are known to exist), Modigliani chose a proto-Cubist palette more akin to Cézanne than to the Macchiaioli.

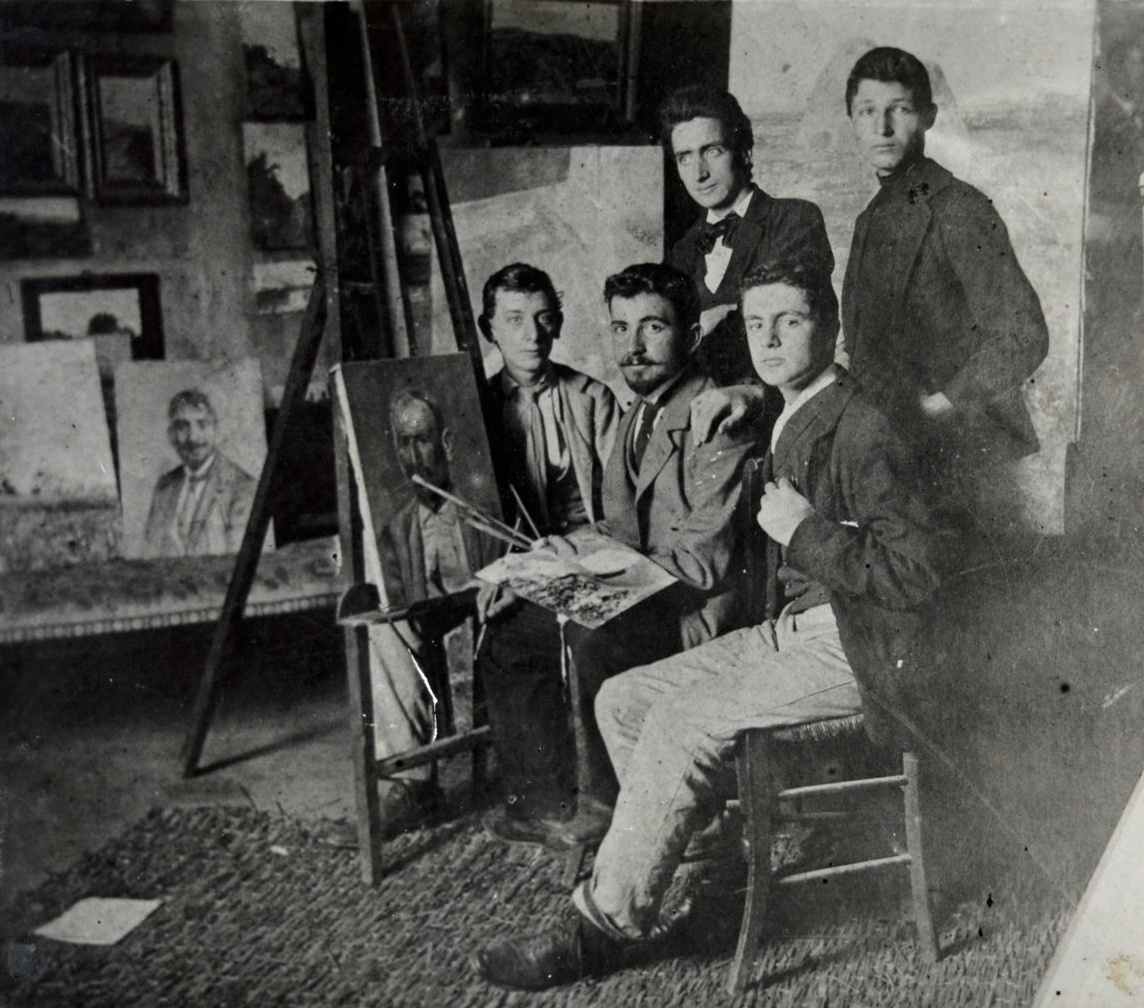
Modigliani in the studio of Gino Romiti

While with Micheli, Modigliani studied not only landscape, but also portraiture, still life, and the nude. His fellow students recall that the last was where he displayed his greatest talent, and apparently, this was not an entirely academic pursuit for the teenager: when not painting nudes, he was occupied with seducing the household maid.

Despite his rejection of the Macchiaioli approach, Modigliani nonetheless found favour with his teacher, who referred to him as "Superman", a pet name reflecting the fact that Modigliani was not only quite adept at his art, but also that he regularly quoted from Nietzsche's Thus Spoke Zarathustra. Fattori himself would often visit the studio and approve of the young artist's innovations.

In 1902, Modigliani continued what was to be a lifelong infatuation with life drawing, enrolling in the Scuola Libera di Nudo, or "Free School of Nude Studies", of the Accademia di Belle Arti in Florence. A year later, while still suffering from tuberculosis, he moved to Venice, where he registered to study at the Regia Accademia ed Istituto di Belle Arti. It is in Venice that he first smoked hashish and, rather than studying, began to spend time frequenting disreputable parts of the city. The impact of these lifestyle choices upon his developing artistic style is open to conjecture, although these choices do seem to be more than simple teenage rebellion, or the clichéd hedonism and bohemianism that was almost expected of artists of the time; his pursuit of the seedier side of life appears to have roots in his appreciation of radical philosophies, including those of Nietzsche.

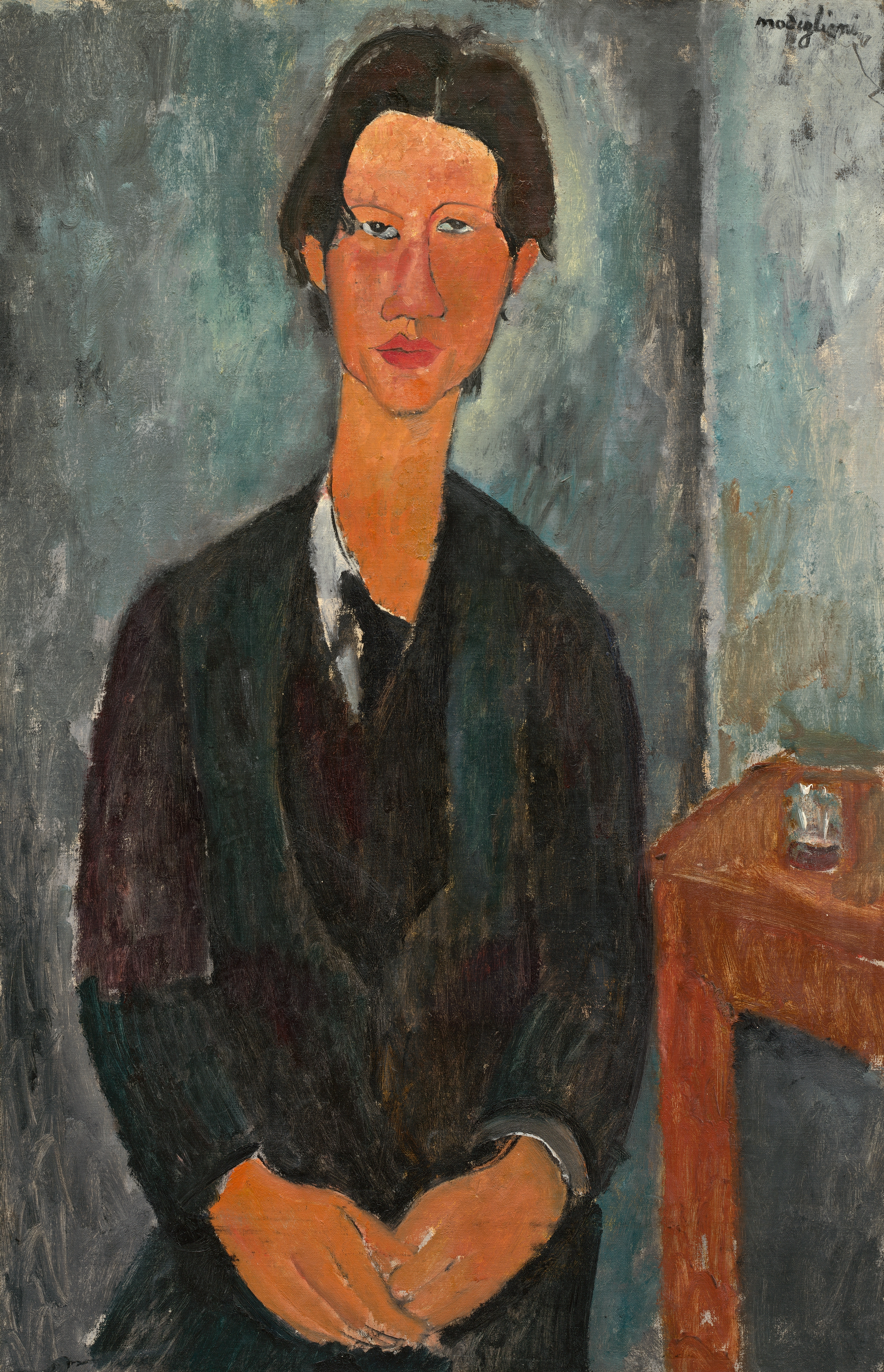
Portrait of Chaïm Soutine, 1916

=== Early literary influences ===
Having been exposed to erudite philosophical literature as a young boy under the tutelage of Isaco Garsin, his maternal grandfather, he continued to read and be influenced through his art studies by the writings of Nietzsche, Baudelaire, Carducci, Comte de Lautréamont, and others, and developed the belief that the only route to true creativity was through defiance and disorder.

Letters that he wrote from his 'sabbatical' in Capri in 1901 clearly indicate that he is being more and more influenced by the thinking of Nietzsche. In these letters, he advised his friend Oscar Ghiglia;

(hold sacred all) which can exalt and excite your intelligence... (and) ... seek to provoke ... and to perpetuate ... these fertile stimuli, because they can push the intelligence to its maximum creative power.

The work of Lautréamont was equally influential at this time. This doomed poet's Les Chants de Maldoror became the seminal work for the Parisian Surrealists of Modigliani's generation, and the book became Modigliani's favourite to the extent that he learnt it by heart. The poetry of Lautréamont is characterised by the juxtaposition of fantastical elements, and by sadistic imagery; the fact that Modigliani was so taken by this text in his early teens gives a good indication of his developing tastes. Baudelaire and D'Annunzio similarly appealed to the young artist, with their interest in corrupted beauty, and the expression of that insight through Symbolist imagery.

Modigliani wrote to Ghiglia extensively from Capri, where his mother had taken him to assist in his recovery from tuberculosis. These letters are a sounding board for the developing ideas brewing in Modigliani's mind. Ghiglia was seven years Modigliani's senior, and it is likely that it was he who showed the young man the limits of his horizons in Livorno. Like many precocious teenagers, Modigliani preferred the company of older companions, and Ghiglia's role in his adolescence was to be a sympathetic ear as he worked himself out, principally in the convoluted letters that he regularly sent, and which survive today.

Dear friend, I write to pour myself out to you and to affirm myself to myself. I am the prey of great powers that surge forth and then disintegrate ... A bourgeois told me today–insulted me–that I or at least my brain was lazy. It did me good. I should like such a warning every morning upon awakening: but they cannot understand us nor can they understand life...

== Paris ==
=== Arrival ===
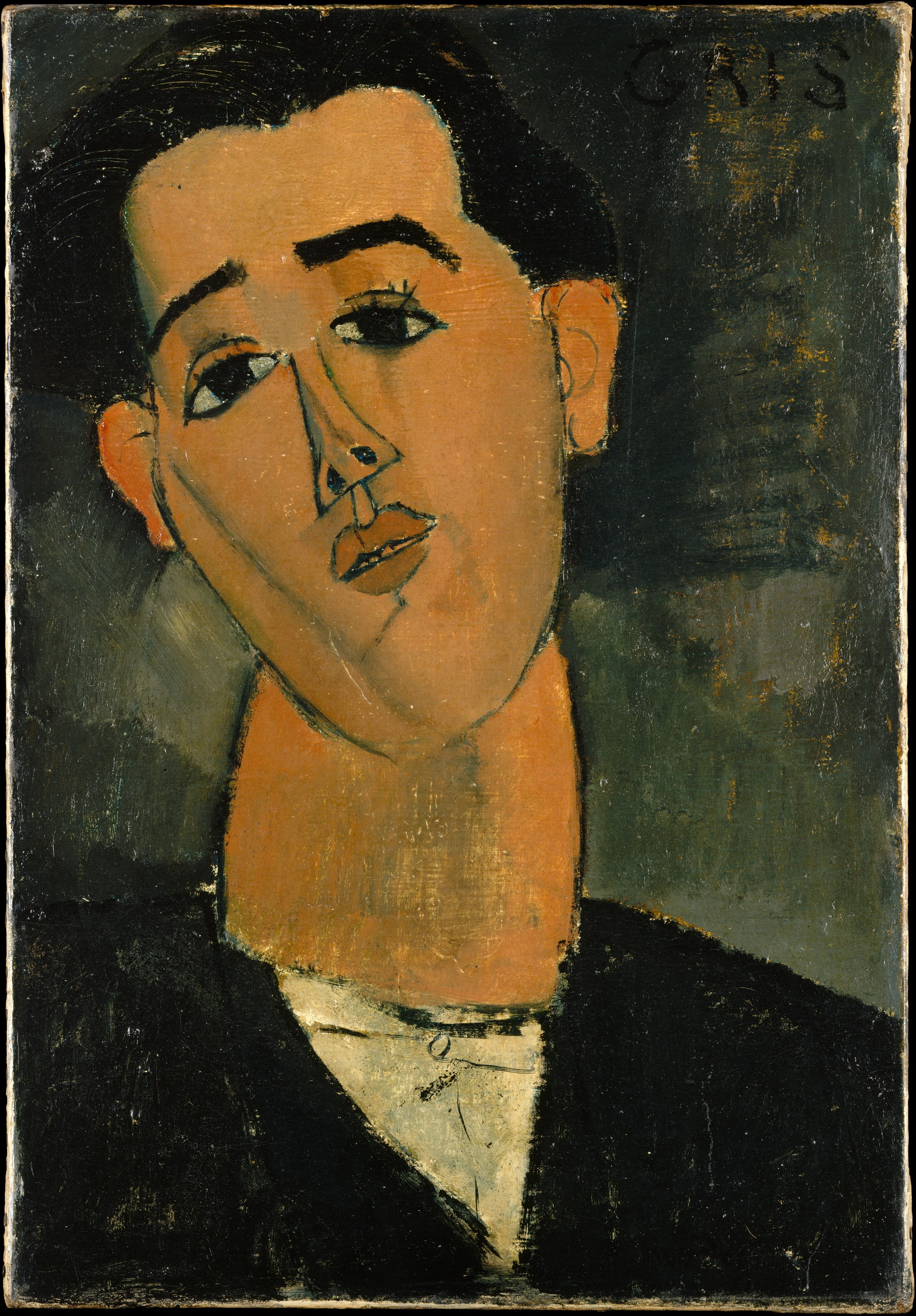
Portrait of Juan Gris, 1915

In 1906, Modigliani moved to Paris, then the focal point of the avant-garde. In fact, his arrival at the centre of artistic experimentation coincided with the arrival of two other foreigners who were also to leave their marks upon the art world: Gino Severini and Juan Gris.

He later befriended Jacob Epstein, with whom he aimed to set up a studio or Temple of Beauty to be enjoyed by all. Modigliani himself intended to create the drawings and paintings of the stone caryatids for 'The Pillars of Tenderness', which would support the imagined temple.

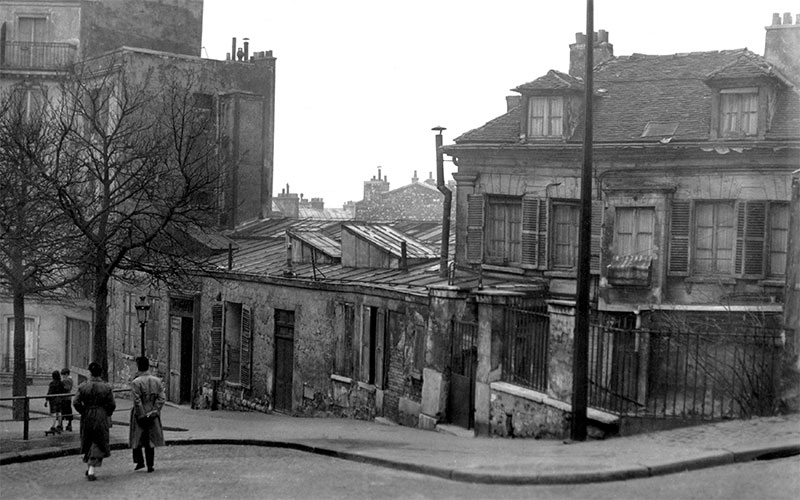
Le Bateau-Lavoir in 1910

Modigliani squatted in the Bateau-Lavoir, a commune for penniless artists in Montmartre, renting himself a studio in Rue Caulaincourt. Even though this artists' quarter of Montmartre was characterized by generalized poverty, Modigliani himself presented—initially, at least—as one would expect the son of a family trying to maintain the appearances of its lost financial standing to present: his wardrobe was dapper without ostentation, and the studio he rented was appointed in a style appropriate to someone with a finely attuned taste in plush drapery and Renaissance reproductions. He soon made efforts to assume the guise of the bohemian artist, but, even in his brown corduroys, scarlet scarf and large black hat, he continued to appear as if he were slumming it, having fallen upon harder times.

When he first arrived in Paris, he wrote home regularly to his mother, sketched his nudes at the Académie Colarossi, and drank wine in moderation. At that time, he was considered, by those who knew him, to be a bit reserved, verging on the asocial, and is noted to have commented, upon meeting Picasso, who at the time was wearing his trademark workmen's clothes, that even though the man was a genius, that did not excuse his uncouth appearance.

=== Transformation ===
Within a year of arriving in Paris, however, his demeanour and reputation had changed dramatically. He transformed himself from a dapper academician artist into a sort of prince of vagabonds.

The poet and journalist Louis Latourette, upon visiting the artist's previously well-appointed studio after his transformation, discovered the place in upheaval, the Renaissance reproductions discarded from the walls, the plush drapes in disarray. Modigliani was already an alcoholic and a drug addict by this time, and his studio reflected this. Modigliani's behaviour at this time sheds some light upon his developing style as an artist, in that the studio had become almost a sacrificial effigy for all that he resented about the academic art that had marked his life and his training up to that point.

Not only did he remove all the trappings of his bourgeois heritage from his studio, but he also set about destroying practically all of his own early work, which he described as "Childish baubles, done when I was a dirty bourgeois".

The motivation for this violent rejection of his earlier self is the subject of considerable speculation. From the time of his arrival in Paris, Modigliani consciously crafted a charade persona for himself and cultivated his reputation as a hopeless drunk and voracious drug user. His escalating intake of drugs and alcohol may have been a means by which Modigliani masked his tuberculosis from his acquaintances, few of whom knew of his condition. Tuberculosis—the leading cause of death in France by 1900—was highly communicable, there was no cure, and those who had it were feared, ostracized, and pitied. Modigliani thrived on camaraderie and would not let himself be isolated as an invalid; he used drink and drugs as palliatives to ease his physical pain, helping him to maintain a façade of vitality and allowing him to continue to create his art.

Modigliani's use of drink and drugs intensified from about 1914 onward. After years of remission and recurrence, this was the period during which the symptoms of his tuberculosis worsened, signalling that the disease had reached an advanced stage.

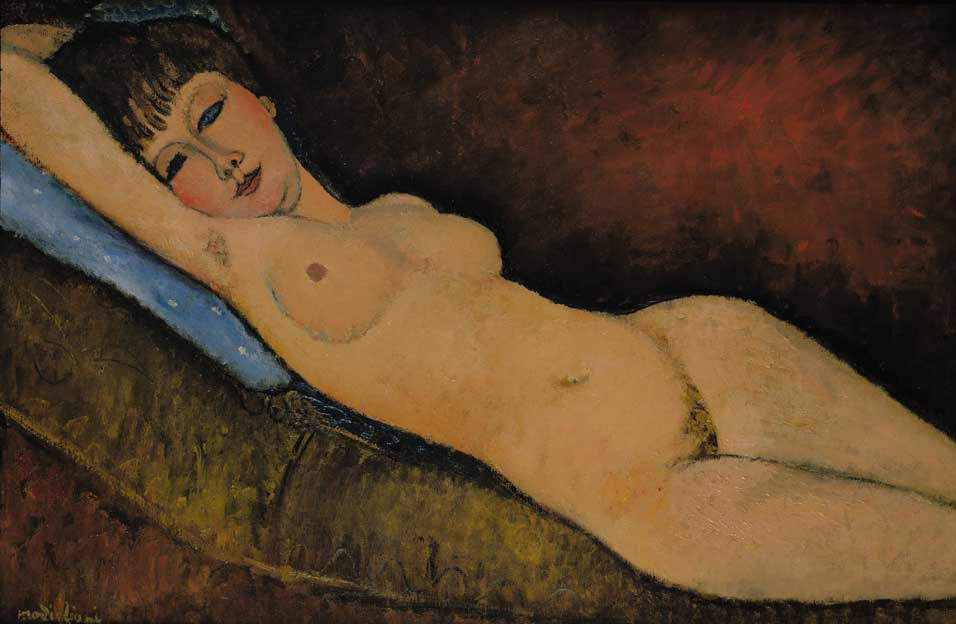
Nu Couché au coussin Bleu, one of the finest examples of reclining nudes by Modigliani, 1916

He sought the company of artists such as Utrillo and Soutine, seeking acceptance and validation for his work from his colleagues. Modigliani's behavior stood out even in these Bohemian surroundings: he carried on frequent affairs, drank heavily, and used absinthe and hashish. While drunk, he would sometimes strip himself naked at social gatherings. He died in Paris, aged 35. He became the epitome of the tragic artist, creating a posthumous legend almost as well known as that of Vincent van Gogh.

During the 1920s, in the wake of Modigliani's career and spurred on by comments by André Salmon crediting hashish and absinthe with the genesis of Modigliani's style, many hopefuls tried to emulate his "success" by embarking on a path of substance abuse and bohemian excess. Salmon claimed that whereas Modigliani was a totally pedestrian artist when sober, "...from the day that he abandoned himself to certain forms of debauchery, an unexpected light came upon him, transforming his art. From that day on, he became one who must be counted among the masters of living art."

Some art historians suggest that it is entirely possible that Modigliani would have achieved even greater artistic heights had he not been immured in, and destroyed by, his own self-indulgences.

=== Output ===
During his early years in Paris, Modigliani worked at a furious pace. He was constantly sketching, making as many as a hundred drawings a day. However, many of his works were lost—destroyed by him as inferior, left behind in his frequent changes of address, or given to girlfriends who did not keep them.

He was first influenced by Henri de Toulouse-Lautrec, but around 1907 he became fascinated with the work of Paul Cézanne. Eventually, he developed his own unique style, one that cannot be adequately categorised with those of other artists.

He met the first serious love of his life, Russian poet Anna Akhmatova, in 1910, when he was 26. They had studios in the same building, and although 21-year-old Anna had recently married, they began an affair. Anna was tall with dark hair, pale skin and grey-green eyes: she embodied Modigliani's aesthetic ideal and the pair became engrossed in each other. After a year, however, Anna returned to her husband.

== Gallery of works ==
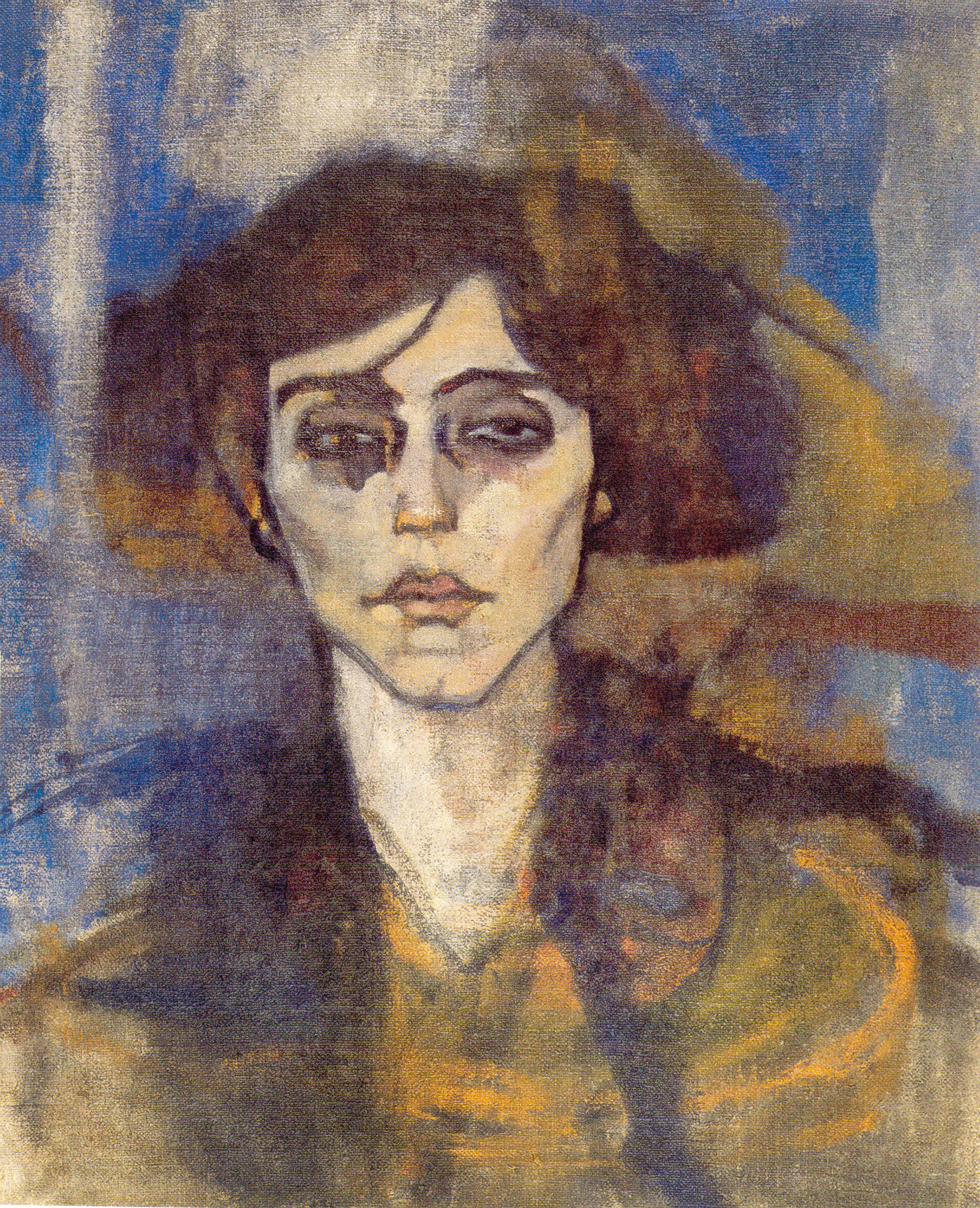
Portrait of Maude Abrantes, 1907, Hecht Museum

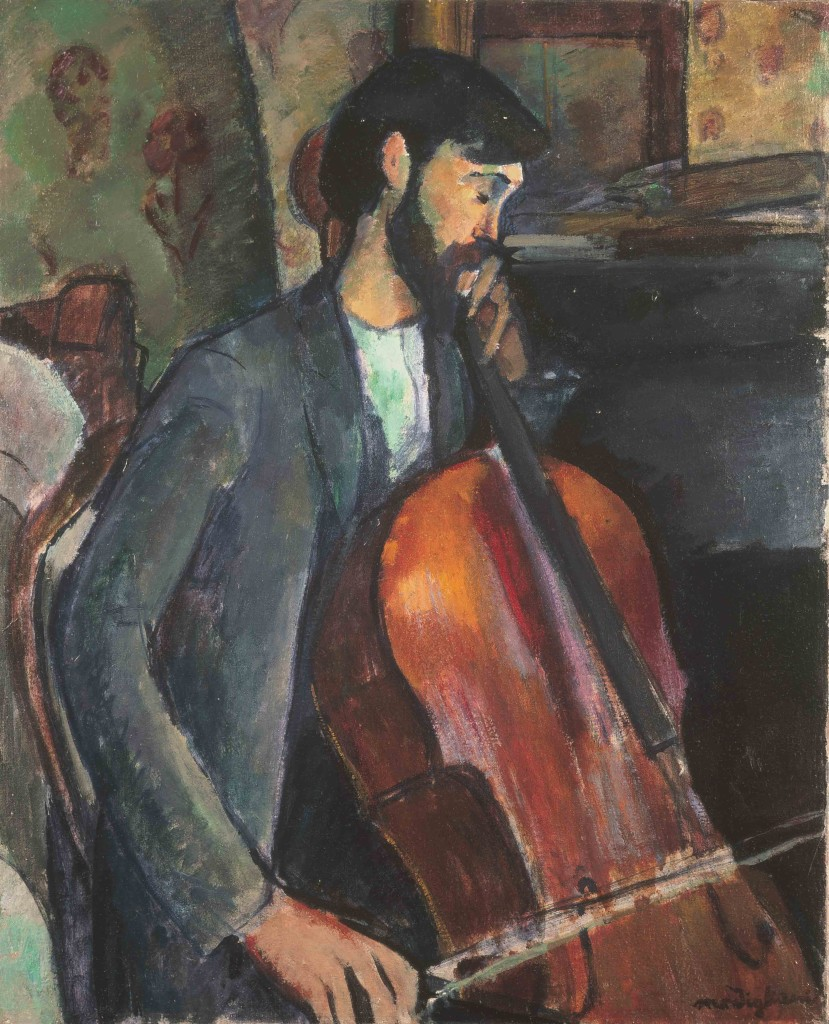
The Cellist, 1909, Juan Abelló Collection

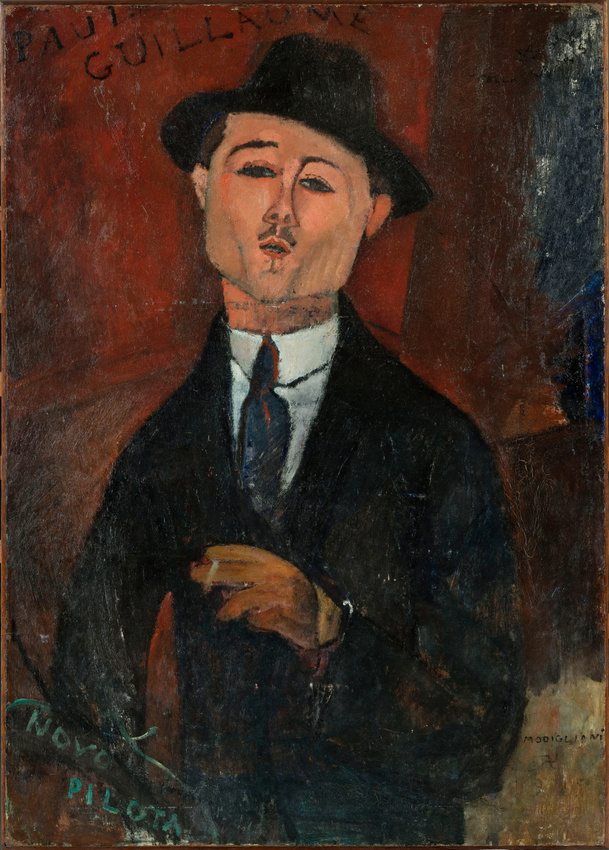
Paul Guillaume, Novo Pilota, 1915, Musée de l'Orangerie

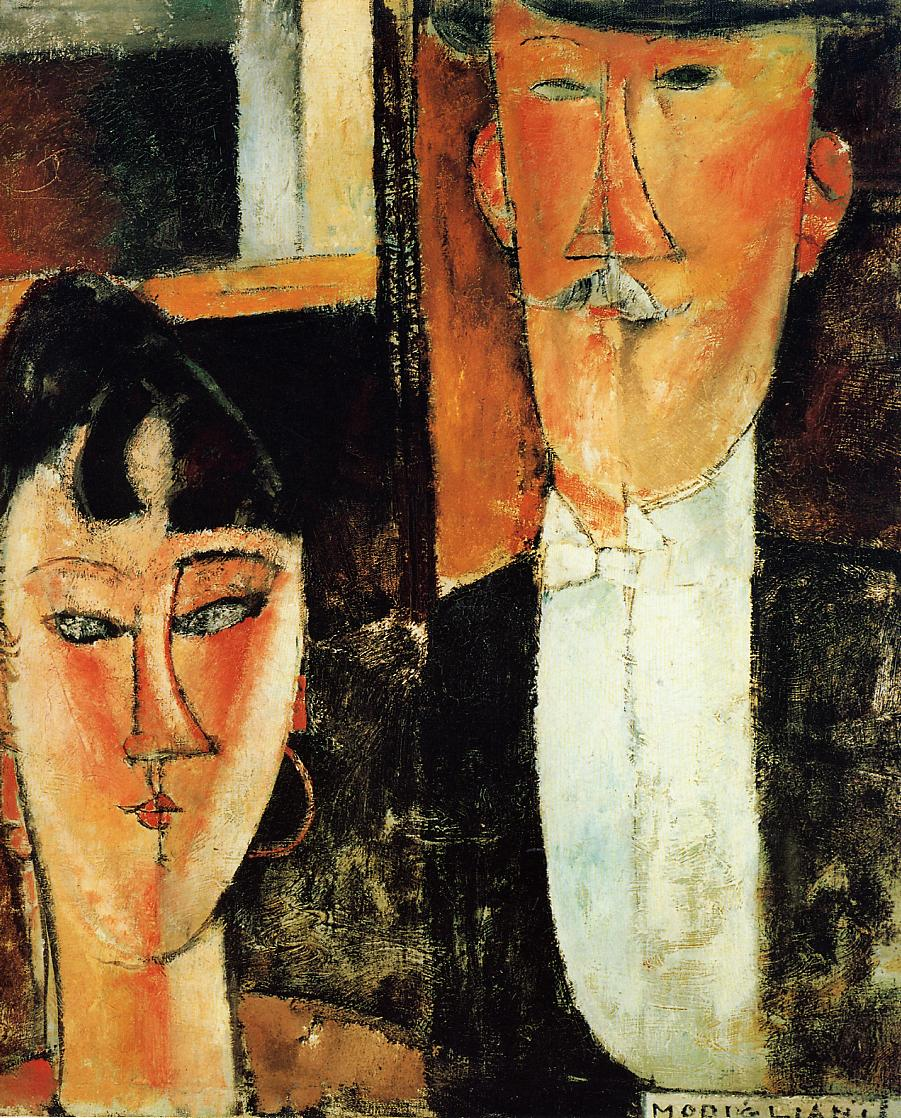
Bride and Groom, 1915

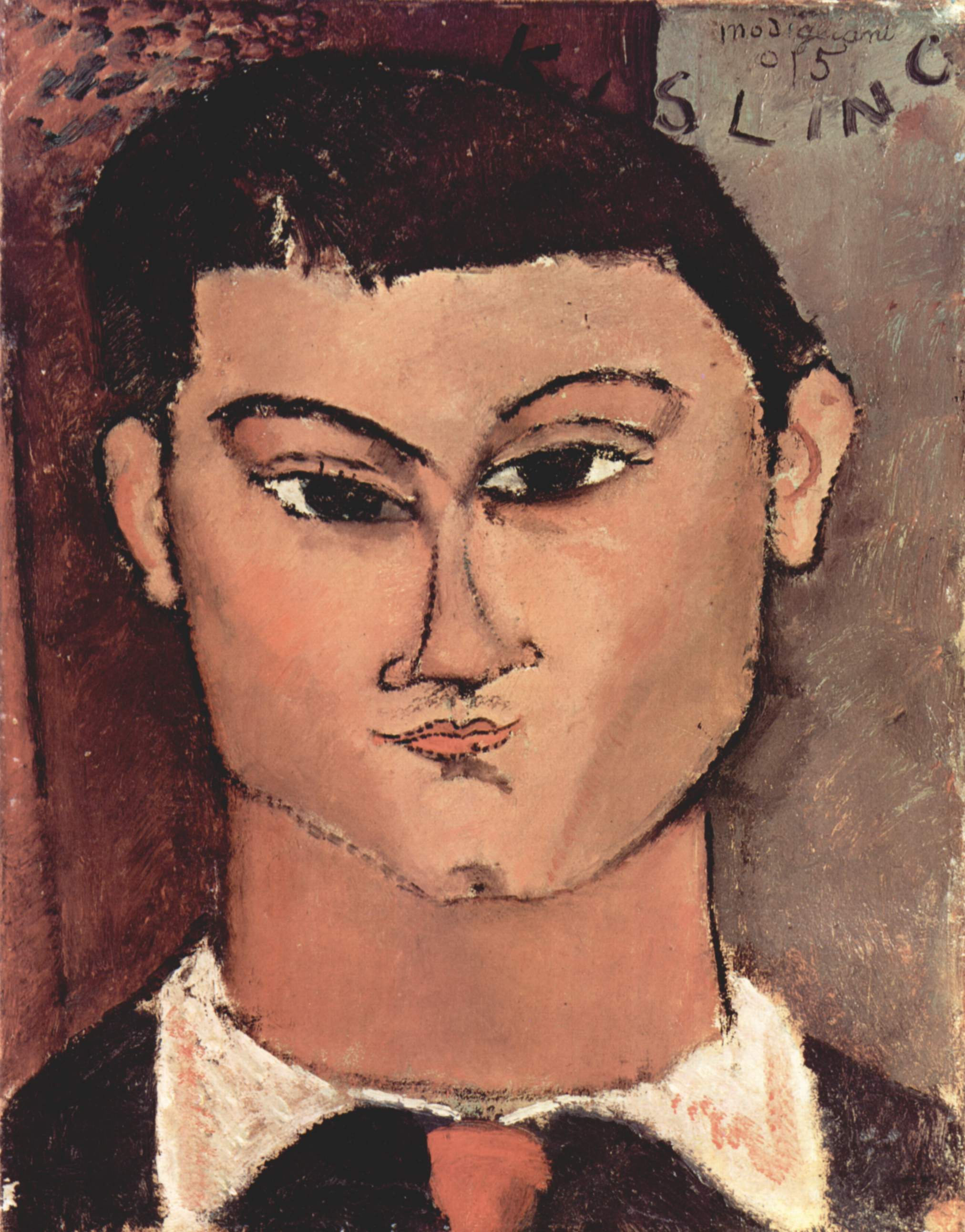
Portrait of Moise Kisling, 1915

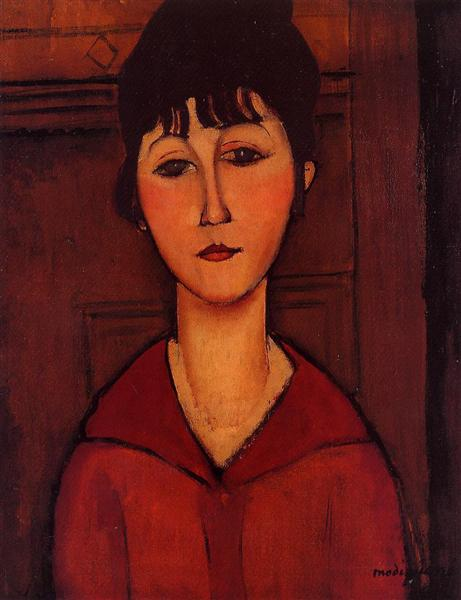
Head of a Young Girl, 1916, private collection

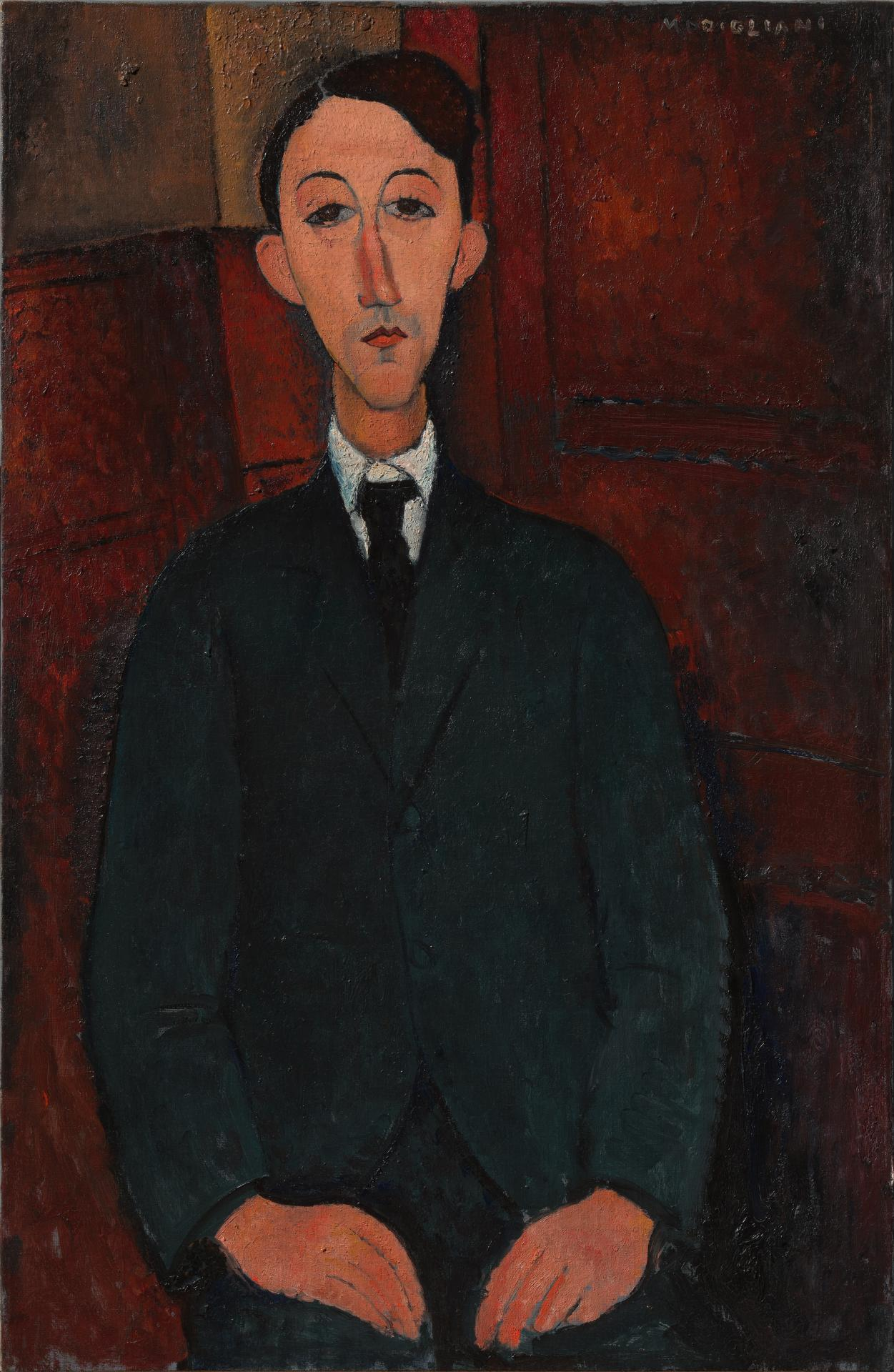
Portrait of the painter Manuel Humbert, 1916, National Gallery of Victoria

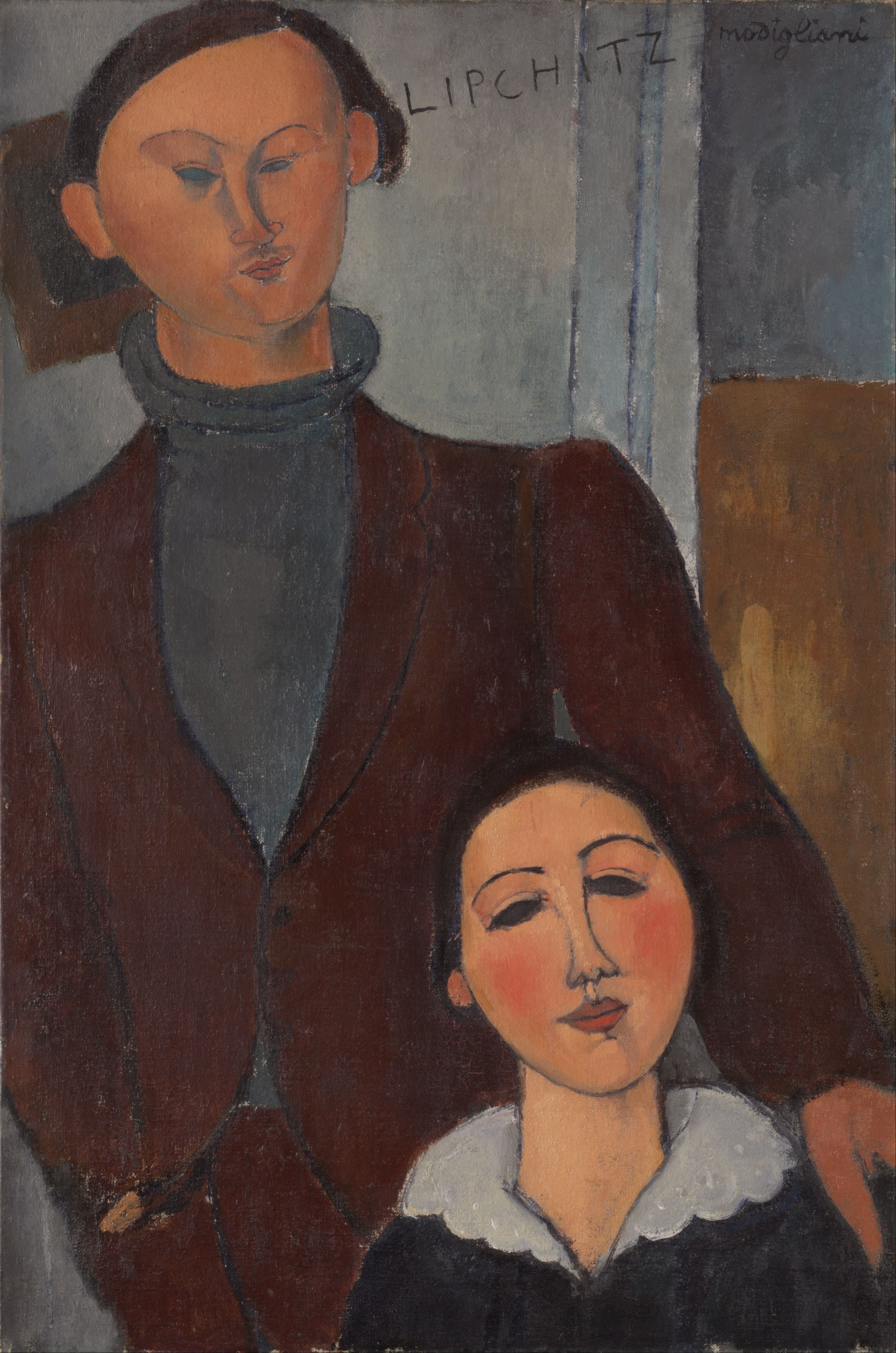
Jacques and Berthe Lipchitz, 1916

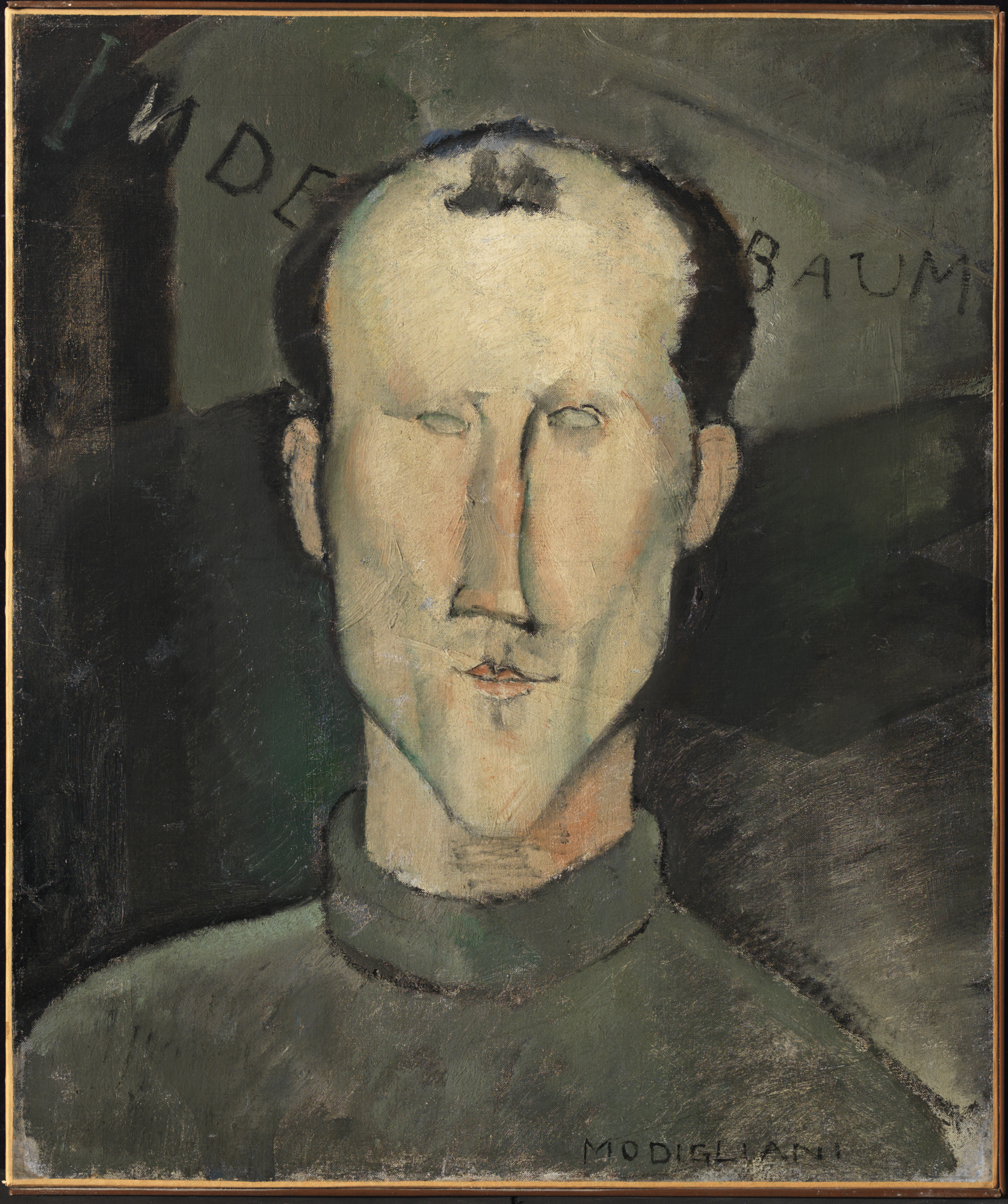
Léon Indenbaum, 1916, Henry and Rose Pearlman Collection, on long-term loan to the Princeton University Art Museum

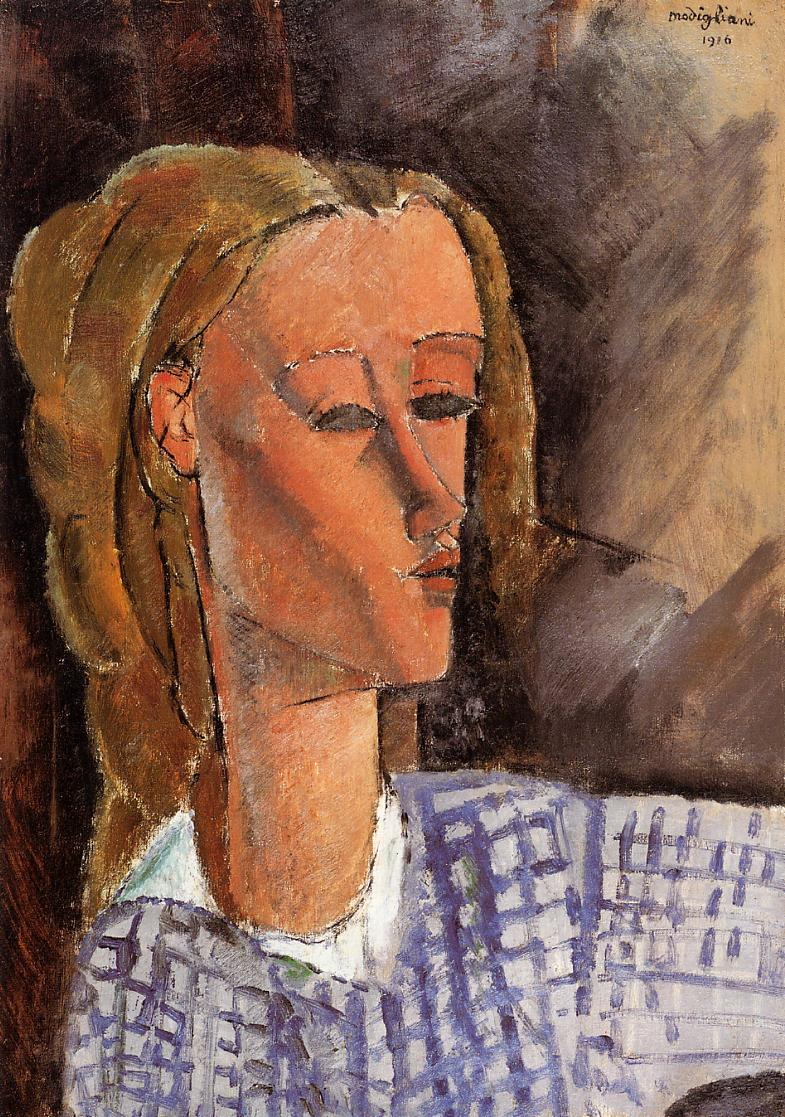
Portrait of Beatrice Hastings, 1916

Madame Kisling, 1917

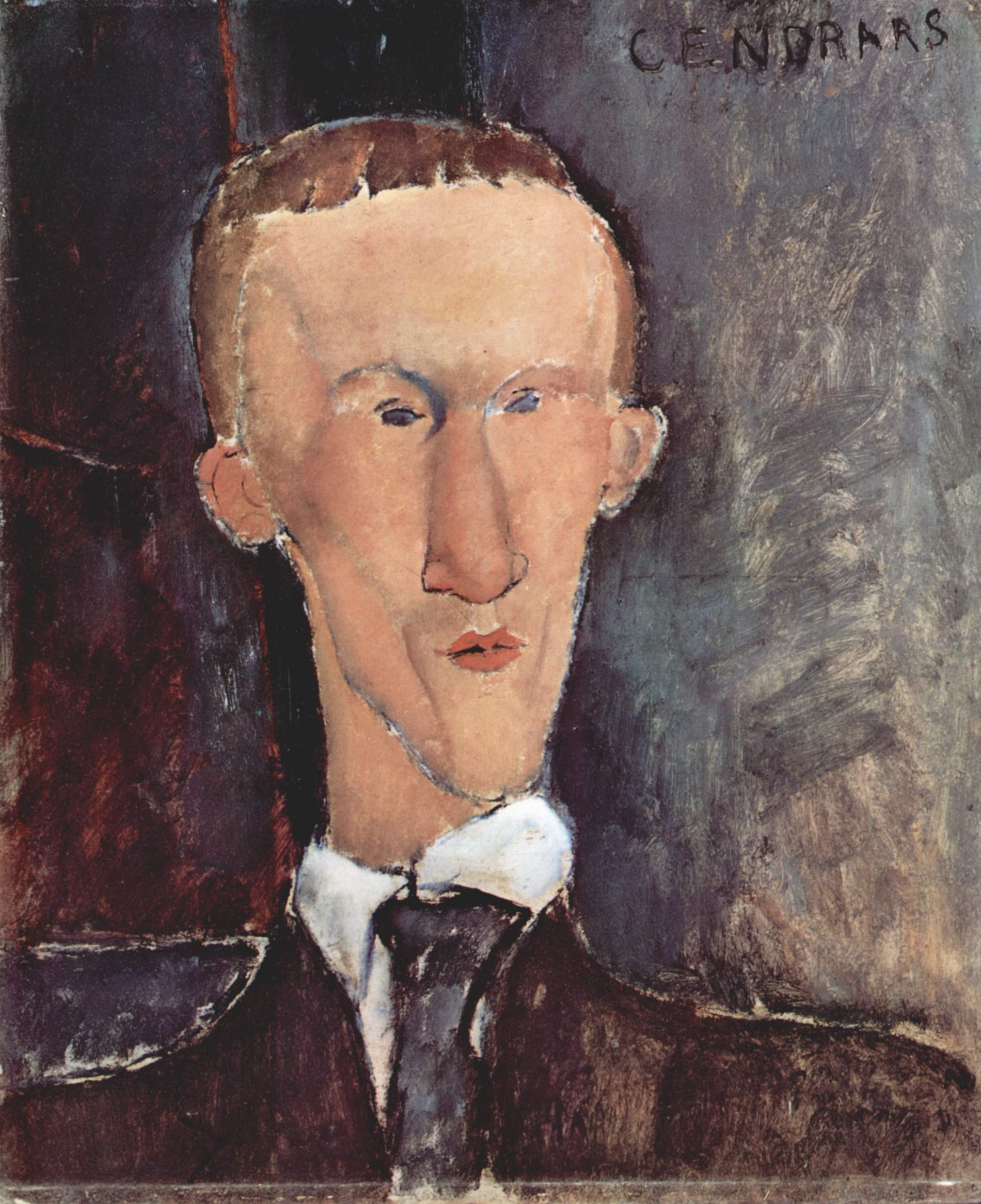
Portrait of Blaise Cendrars, 1917, Galleria Sabauda, Turin

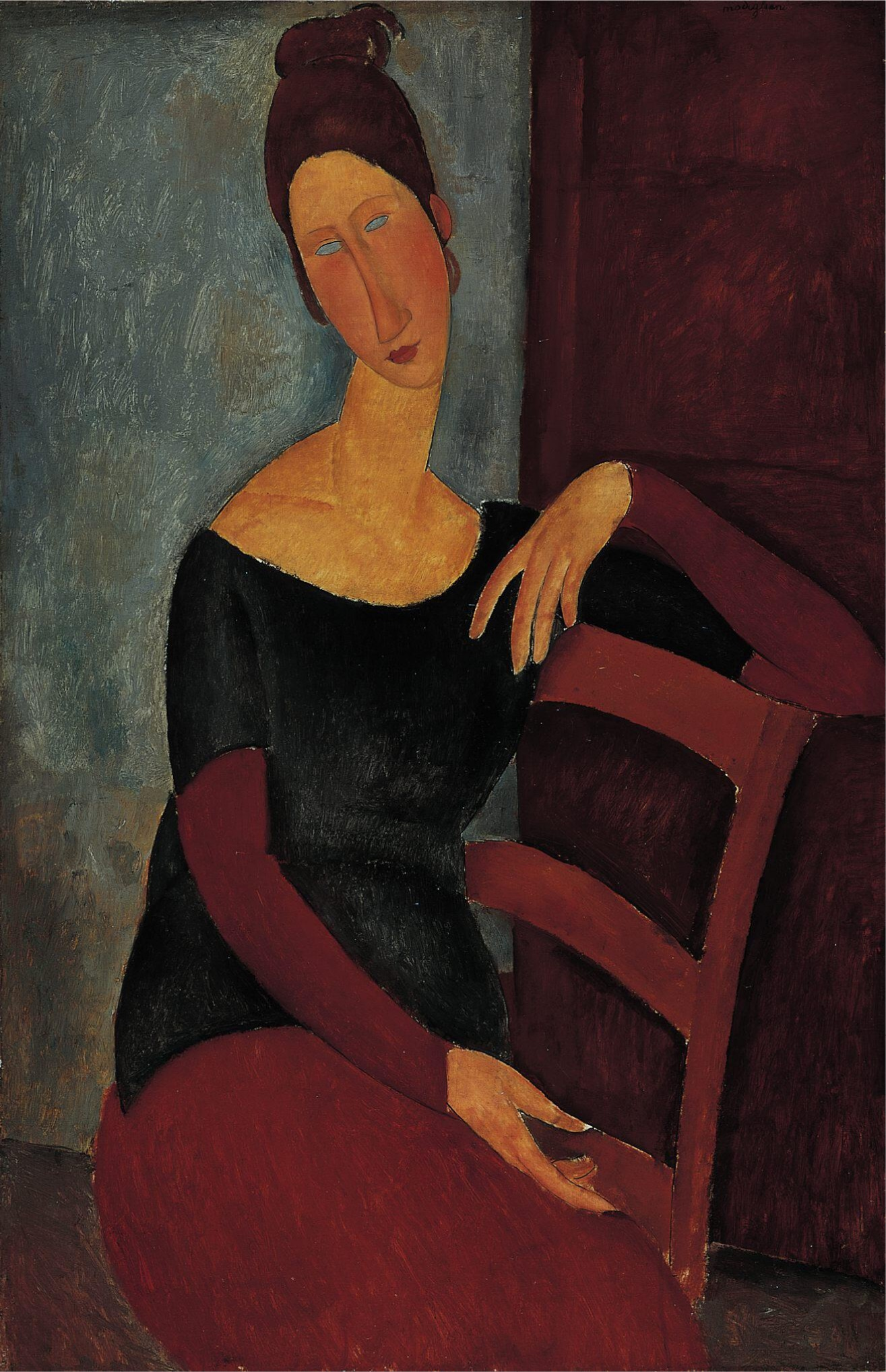
Portrait of the Artist's Wife (Jeanne Hébuterne), 1918

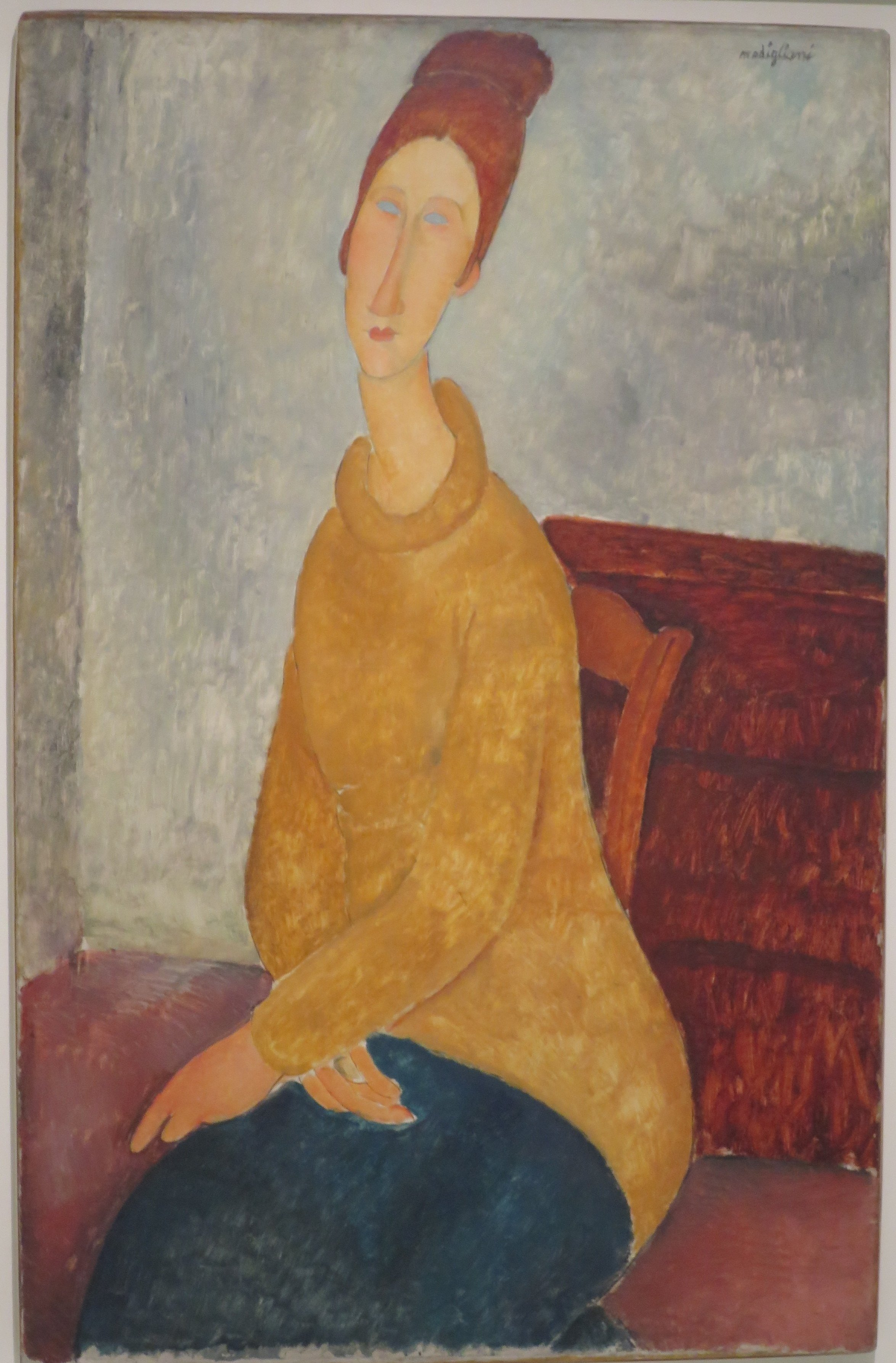
Jeanne Hébuterne with Yellow Sweater, 1918

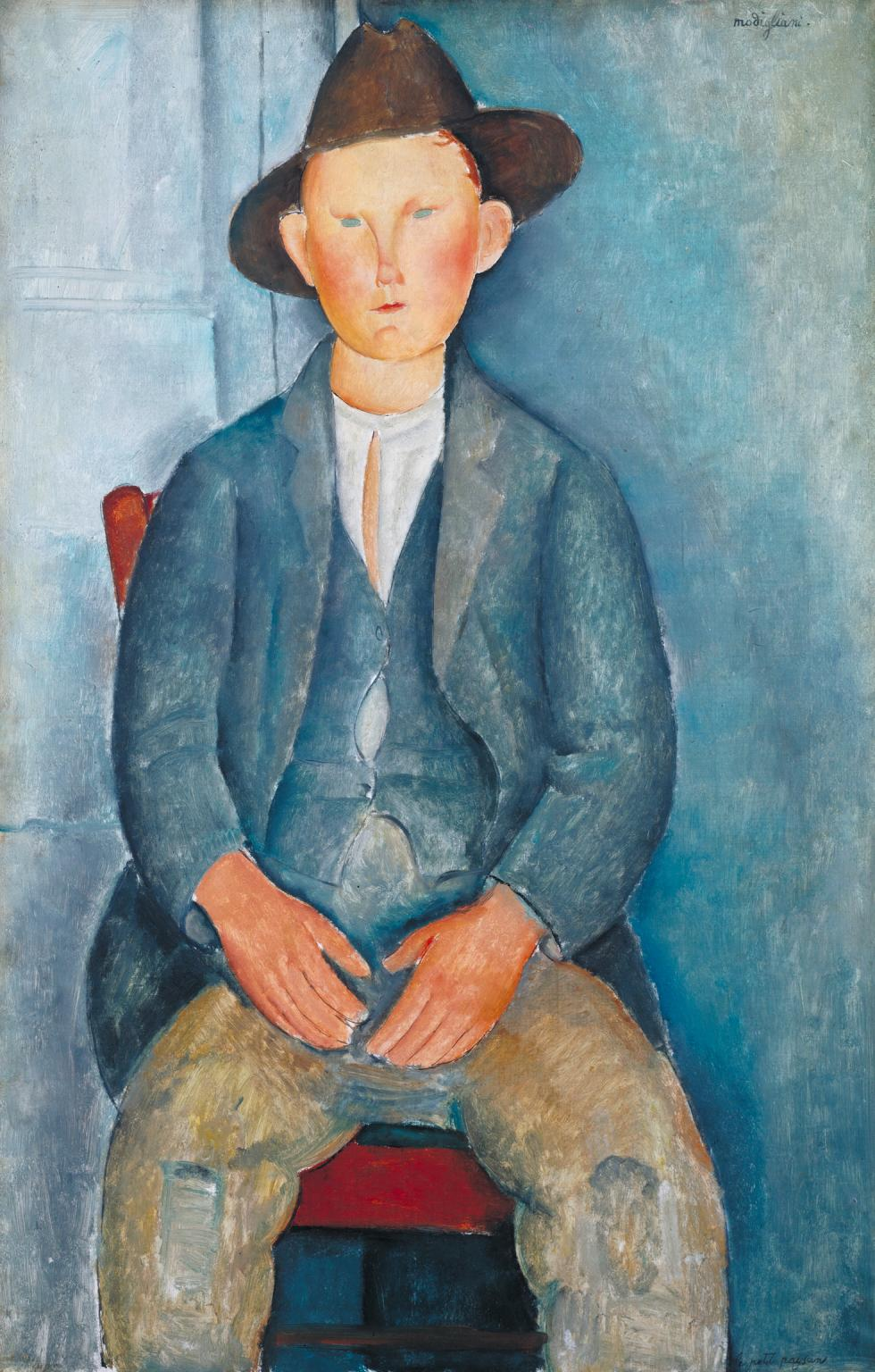
The Little Peasant, 1918, Tate Liverpool

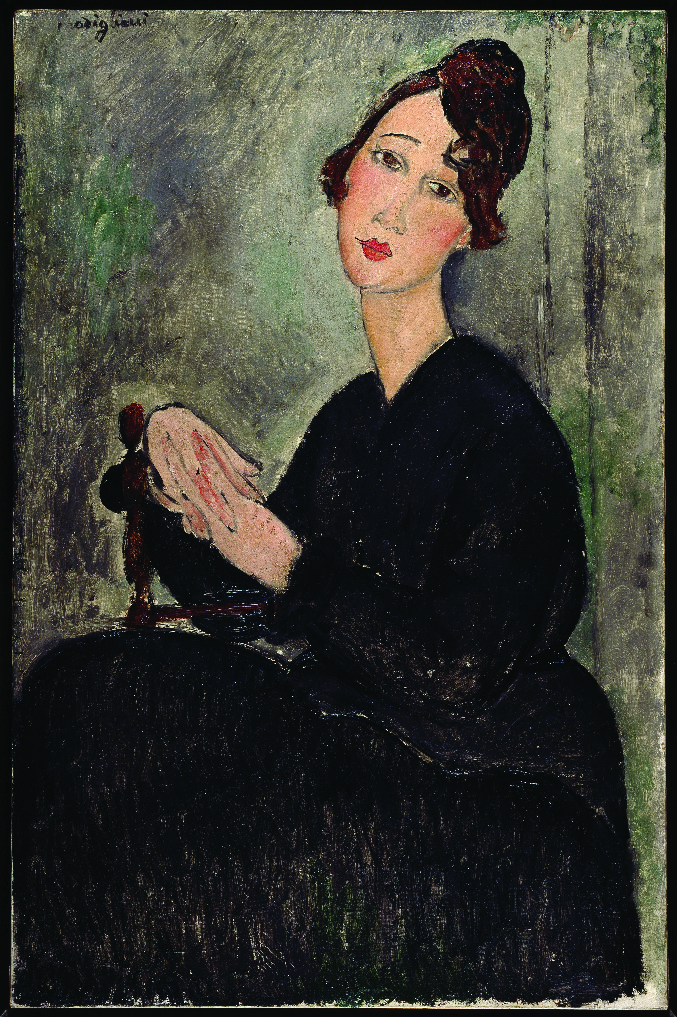
Dedie Hayden, 1918, Centre Georges Pompidou

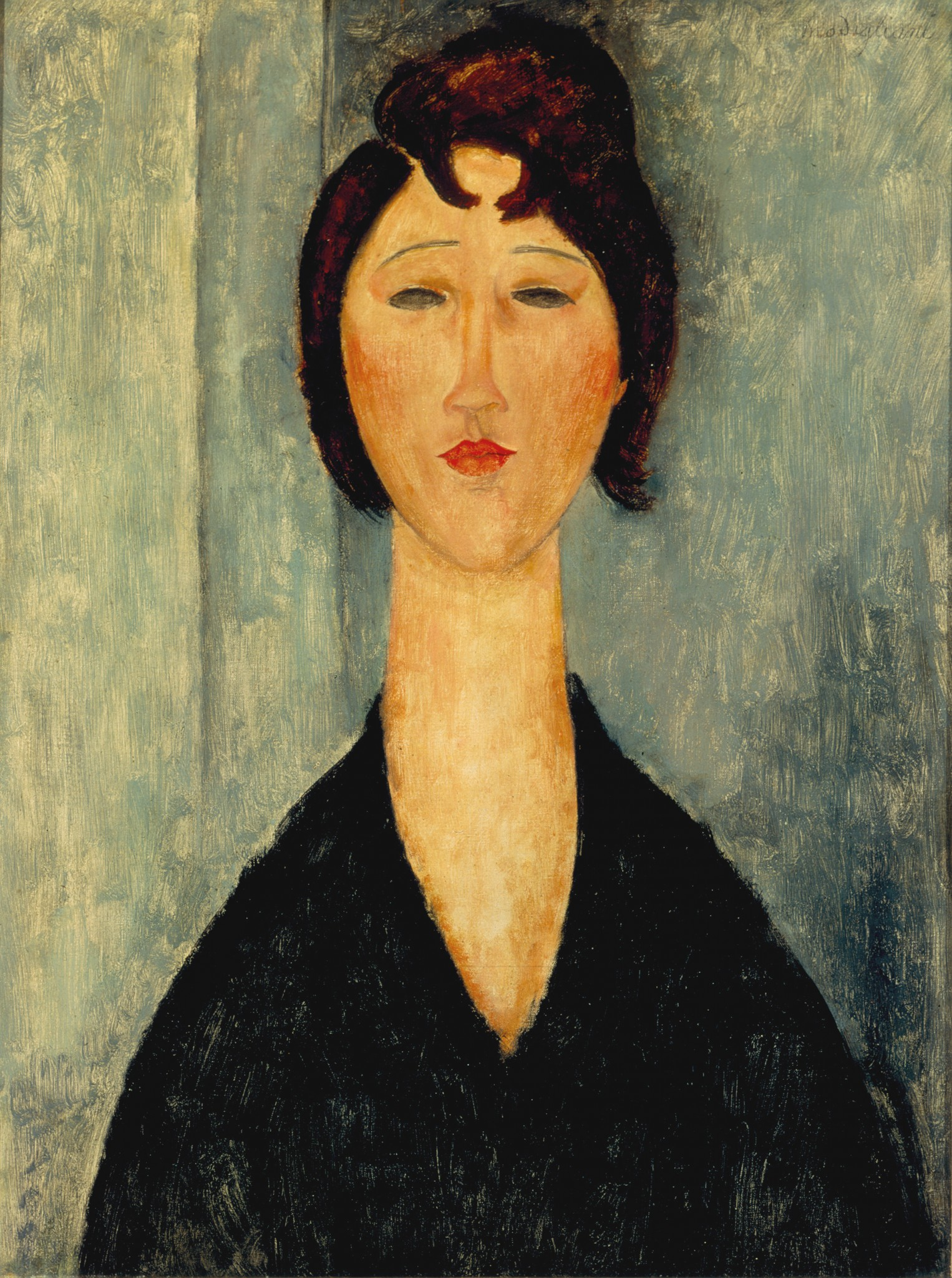
Portrait of a Young Woman, 1918, New Orleans Museum of Art

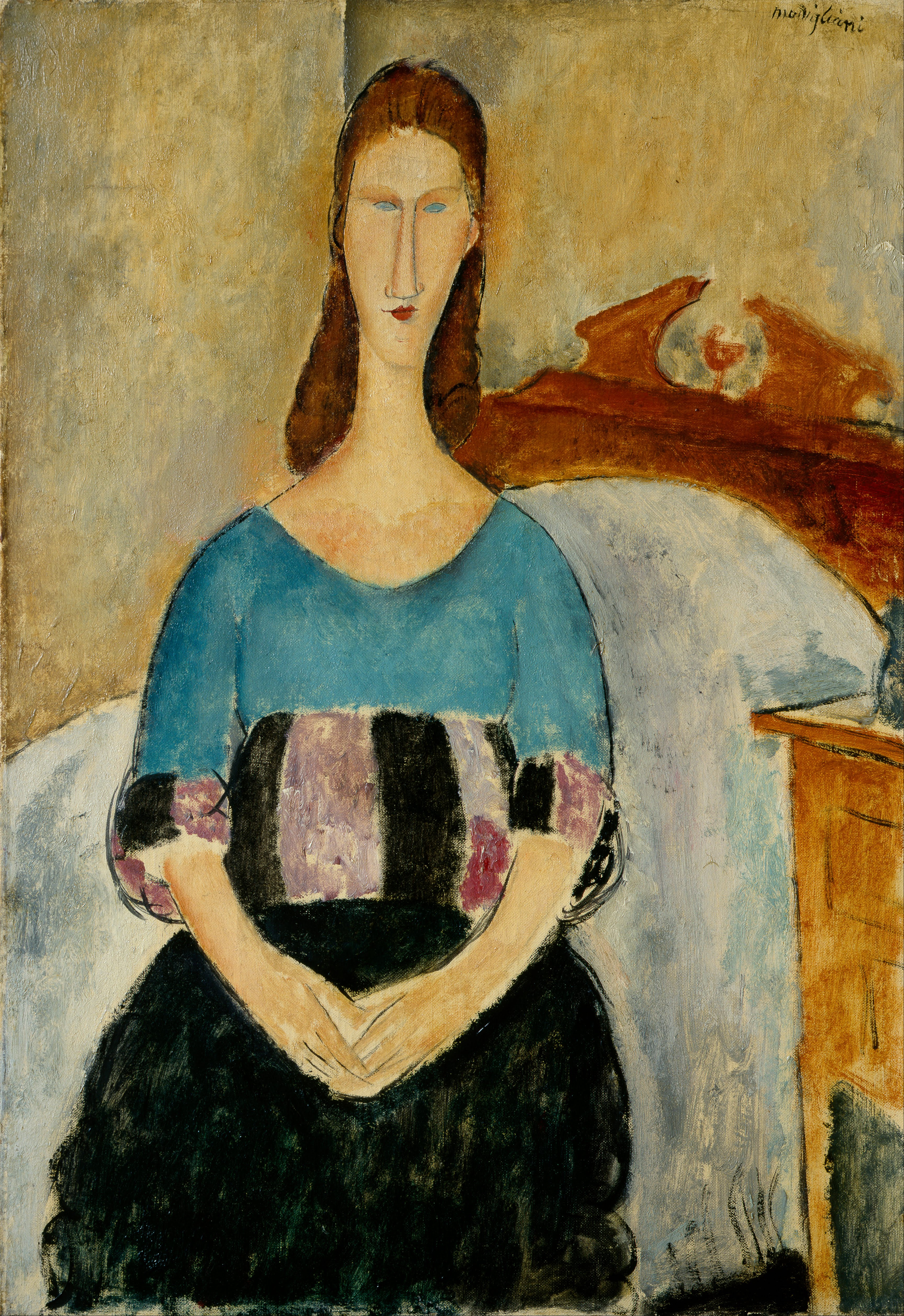
Portrait of Jeanne Hebuterne, Seated, 1918, Israel Museum, Jerusalem

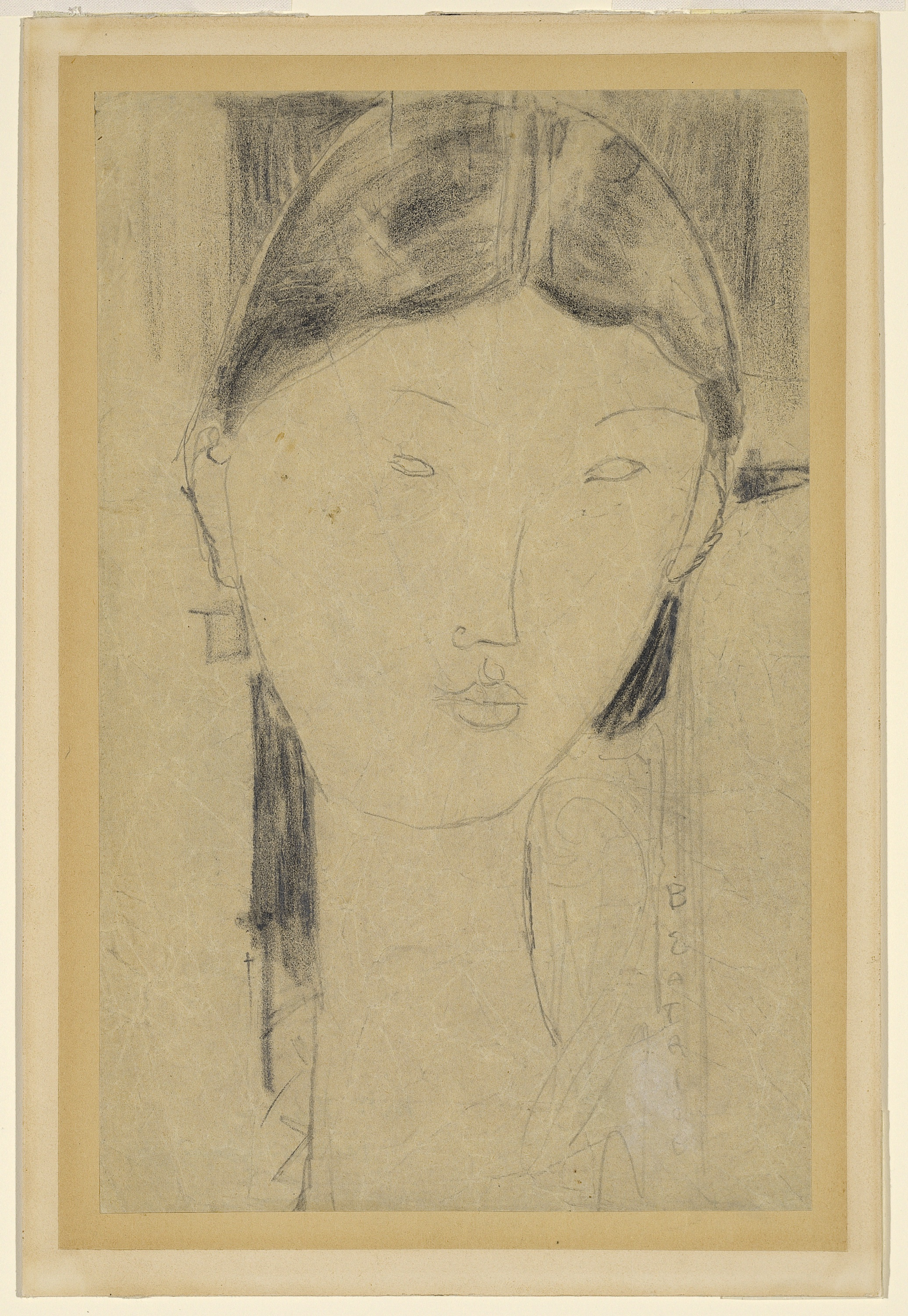
Beatrice Hastings, 1916–1919, Solomon R. Guggenheim Museum

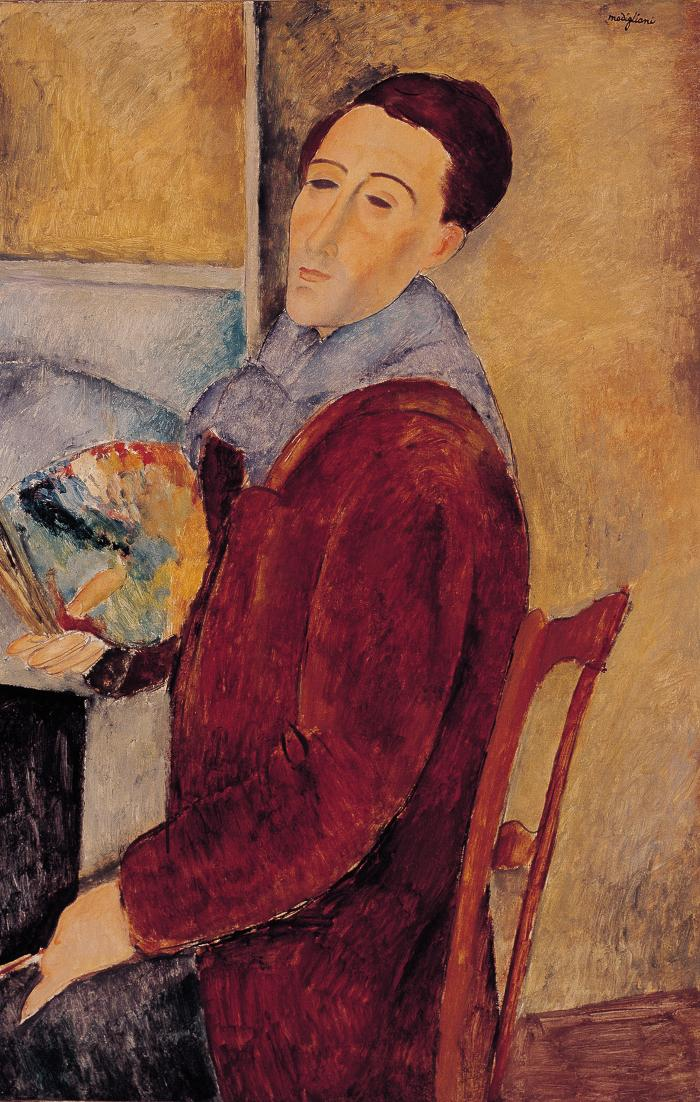
Self-portrait, 1919, oil on canvas, Museum of Contemporary Art, São Paulo

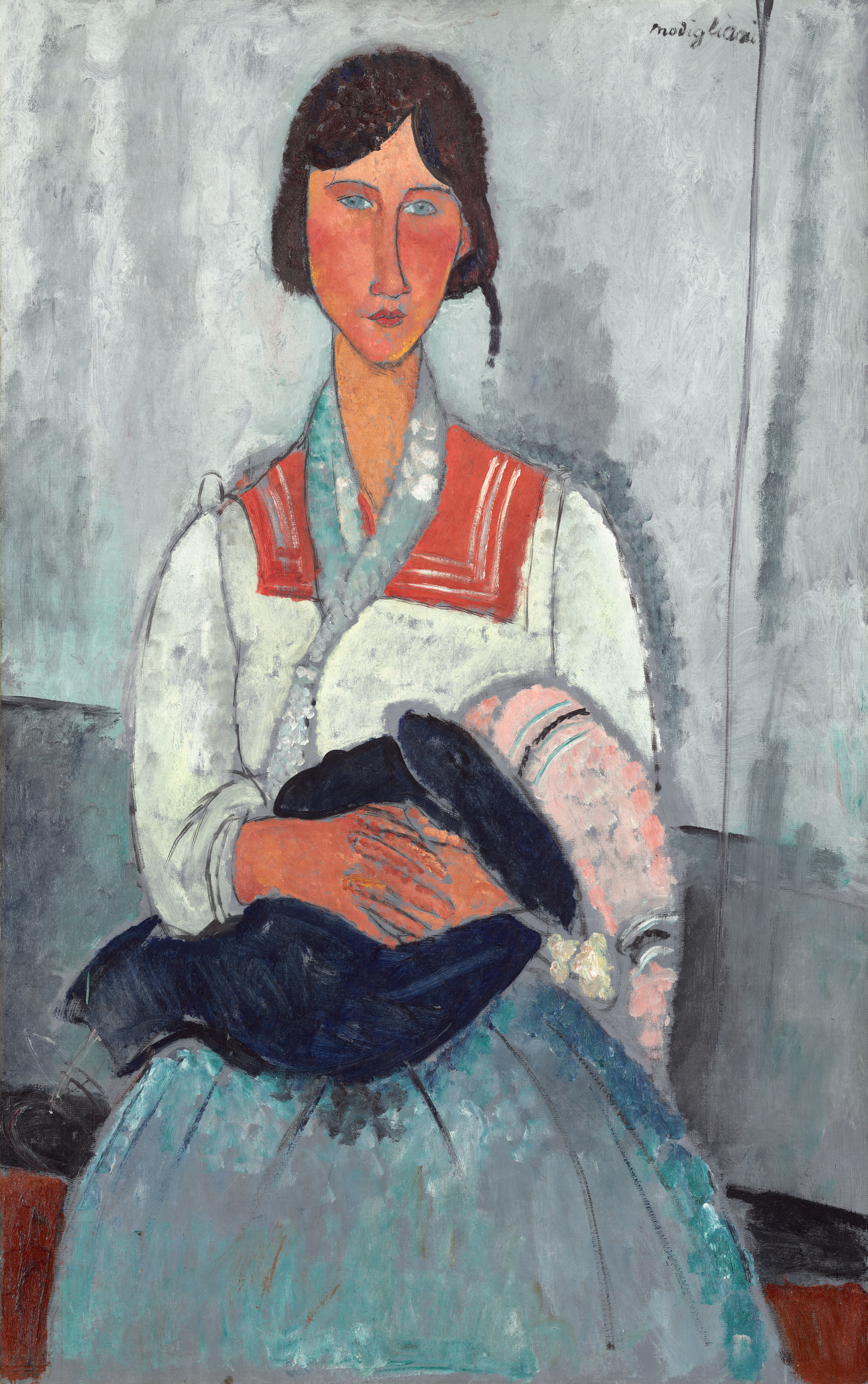
Gypsy Woman with Baby, 1919, National Gallery of Art

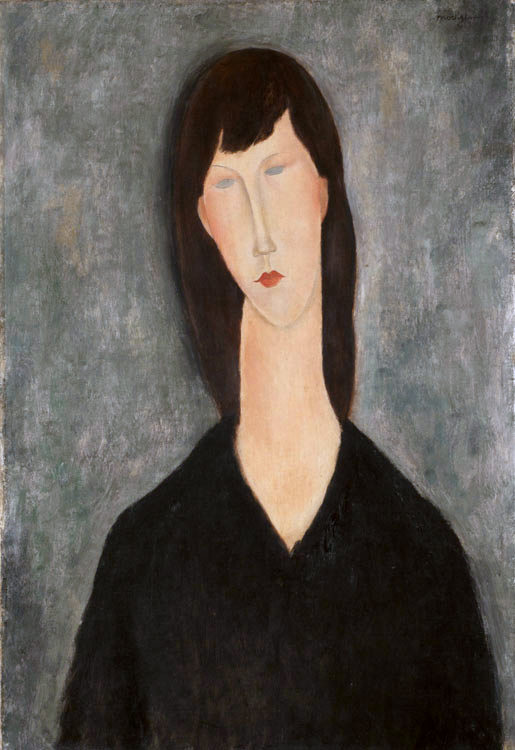
Buste de femme, unknown, before 1919, Museo Nacional de Bellas Artes (Buenos Aires)

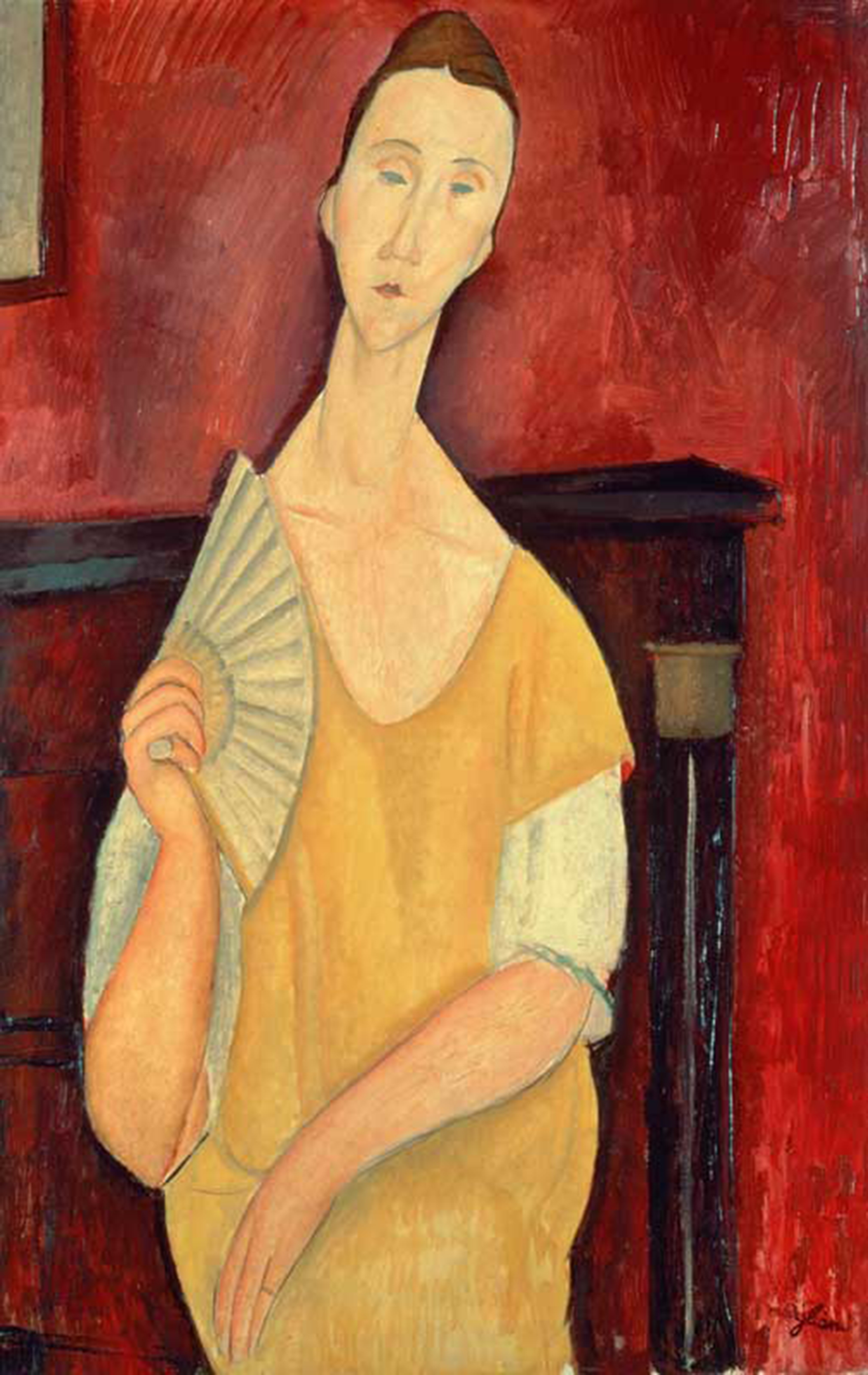
Woman with a Fan, 1919, stolen from Musée d'Art Moderne de la Ville de Paris

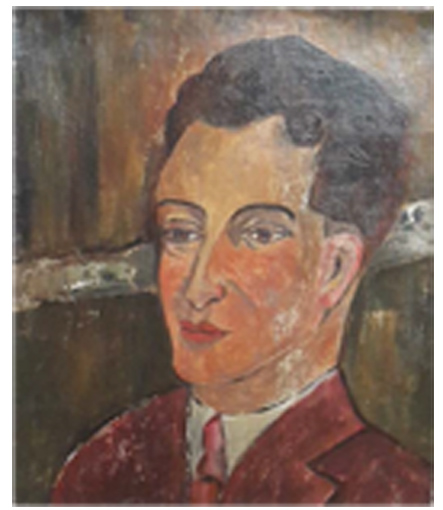
Portrait of a man, 1918, private collector

== Montparnasse, Paris ==
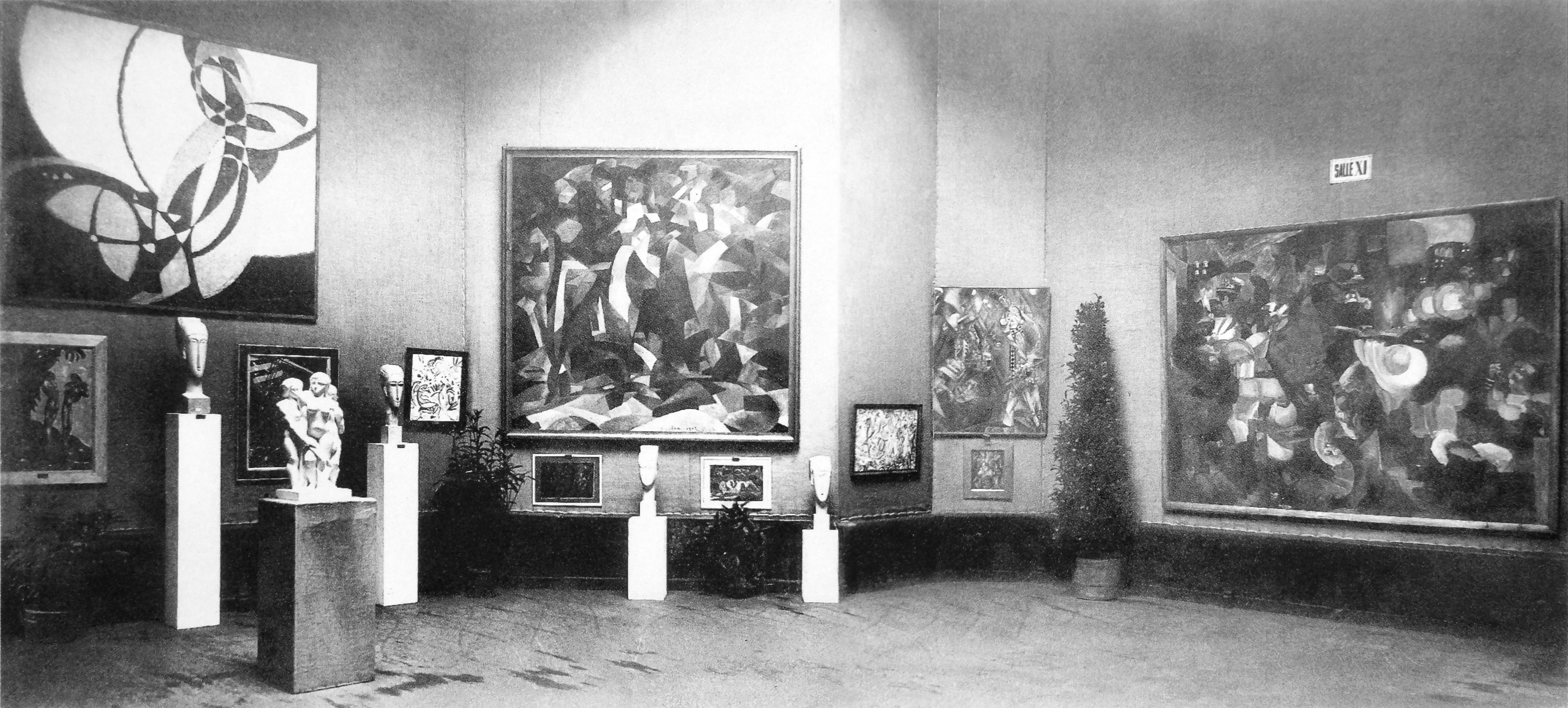
Four sculptures by Modigliani exhibited at the 1912 Salon d'Automne along with the Cubists

=== Sculpture ===
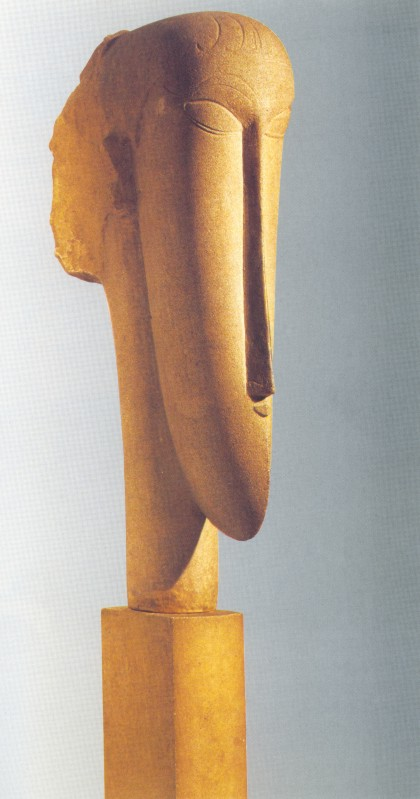
Female Head, 1911/1912, Tate

In 1909, Modigliani returned home to Livorno, sickly and tired from his wild lifestyle. But soon he was back in Paris, this time renting a studio in Montparnasse. He originally saw himself as a sculptor rather than a painter, and was encouraged to continue after Paul Guillaume, an ambitious young art dealer, took an interest in his work and introduced him to sculptor Constantin Brâncuși. He was Constantin Brâncuși's disciple for one year.

Although a series of Modigliani's sculptures were exhibited in the Salon d'Automne of 1912, by 1914 he abandoned sculpting and focused solely on his painting, a move precipitated by the difficulty in acquiring sculptural materials due to the outbreak of war, and by Modigliani's physical debilitation.

In June 2010, Modigliani's Tête, a limestone carving of a woman's head, became the third most expensive sculpture ever sold.

=== Friends and influences ===
Modigliani painted a series of portraits of contemporary artists and friends in Montparnasse: Chaïm Soutine, Moïse Kisling, Pablo Picasso, Diego Rivera, Marie "Marevna" Vorobyev-Stebeslka, Juan Gris, Max Jacob, Jacques Lipchitz, Blaise Cendrars, and Jean Cocteau, all sat for stylized renditions. Modigliani painted Soutine's portrait several times when they lived together in the Cité Falguière around 1916.

== War years ==
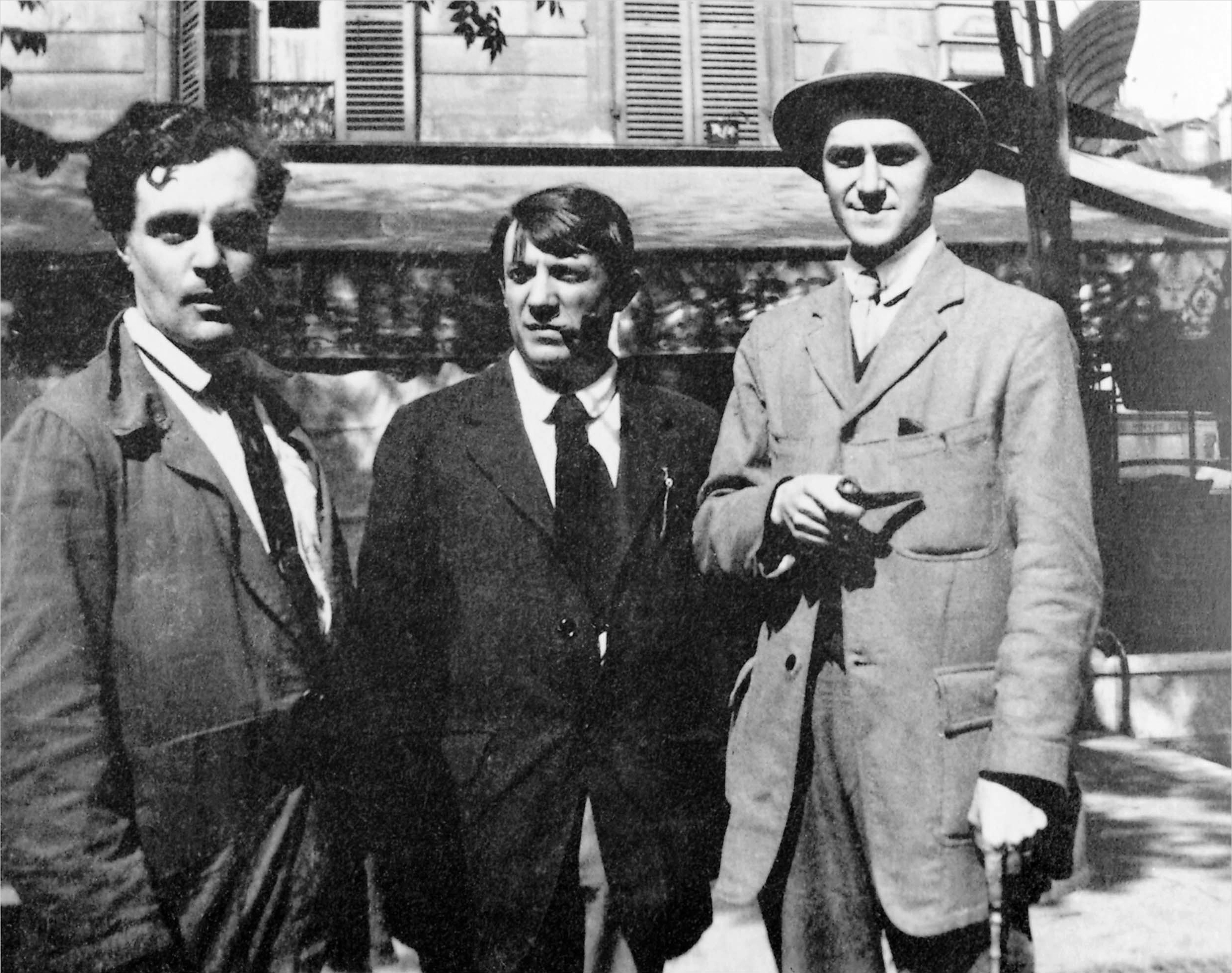
Modigliani, Pablo Picasso and André Salmon, 1916

At the outset of World War I, Modigliani tried to enlist in the army but was refused because of his poor health.

Known as Modì (which plays on the French word 'maudit', meaning 'cursed') by many Parisians, but as Dedo to his family and friends, Modigliani was a handsome man and attracted much female attention. Women came and went until Beatrice Hastings entered his life. She stayed with him for almost two years, was the subject of several of his portraits, including Madame Pompadour, and the object of much of his drunken wrath.

When the British painter Nina Hamnett arrived in Montparnasse in 1914, on her first evening there the smiling man at the next table in the café introduced himself as "Modigliani, painter and Jew". They became great friends.

In 1916, Modigliani befriended the Polish poet and art dealer Léopold Zborowski and his wife Anna. Zborowski became Modigliani's primary art dealer and friend during the artist's final years, helping him financially, and also organizing his show in Paris in 1917.

== Patronage of Léopold Zborowski ==
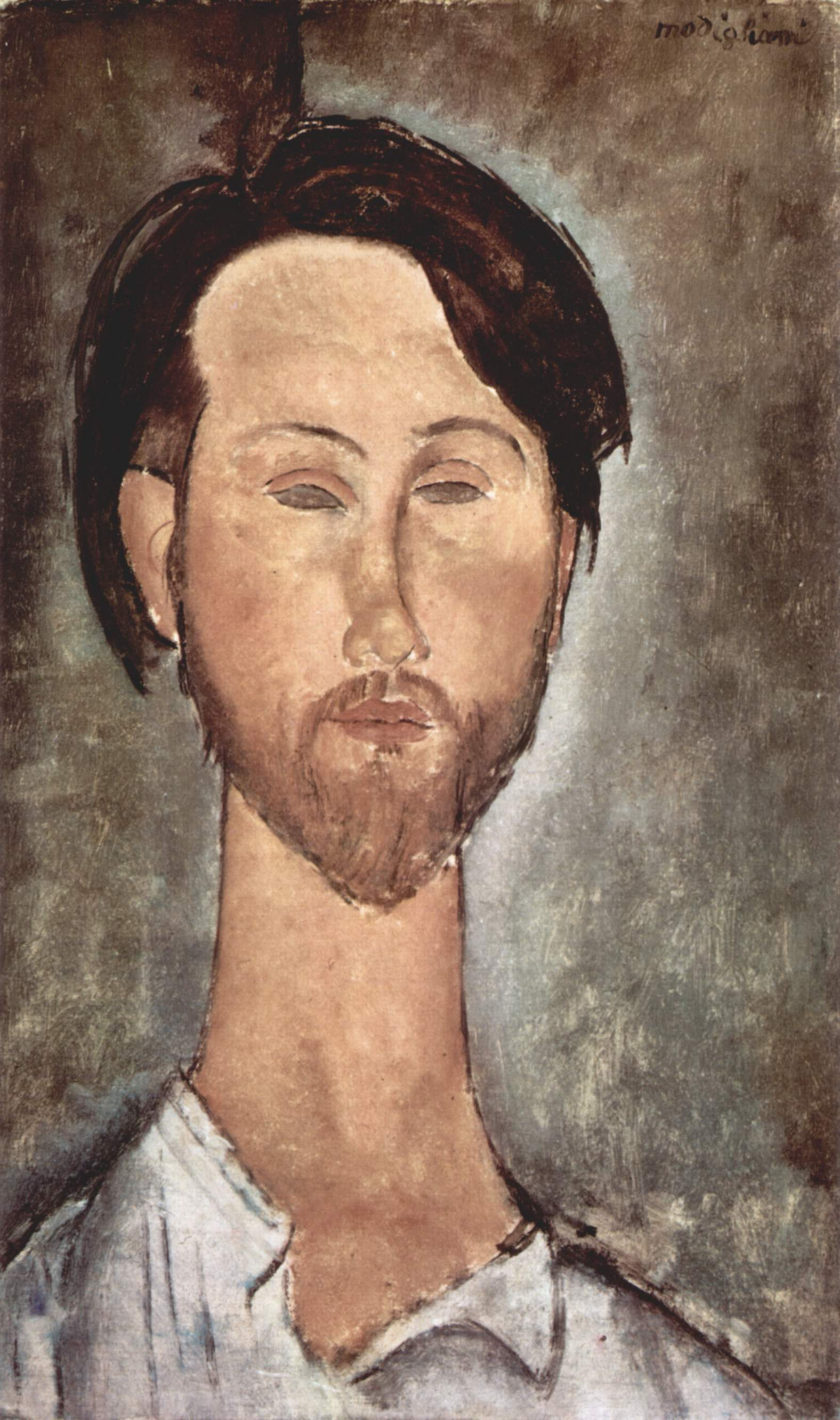
Portrait of Léopold Zborowski, 1918

=== 1917 Paris Show ===
The several dozen nudes Modigliani painted between 1916 and 1919 constitute many of his best-known works. This series of nudes was commissioned by Modigliani's dealer and friend Léopold Zborowski, who lent the artist use of his apartment, supplied models and painting materials, and paid him between fifteen and twenty francs each day for his work.

The paintings from this arrangement were thus different from his previous depictions of friends and lovers in that they were funded by Zborowski either for his own collection, as a favour to his friend, or with an eye to their "commercial potential", rather than originating from the artist's personal circle of acquaintances.

The Paris show of 1917 was Modigliani's only solo exhibition during his life, and is "notorious" in modern art history for its sensational public reception and the attendant issues of obscenity. The show was closed by police on its opening day, but continued thereafter, most likely after the removal of paintings from the gallery's streetfront window.

Nude Sitting on a Divan is one of a series of nudes painted by Modigliani in 1917 that created a sensation when exhibited in Paris that year. According to the catalogue description from the 2010 sale of the painting at Sotheby's, seven nudes were exhibited in the 1917 show.

Nu couché realized $170,405,000 at a Christie's, New York, sale on 9 November 2015, a record for a Modigliani painting and placing it high among the most expensive paintings ever sold.

Nudes

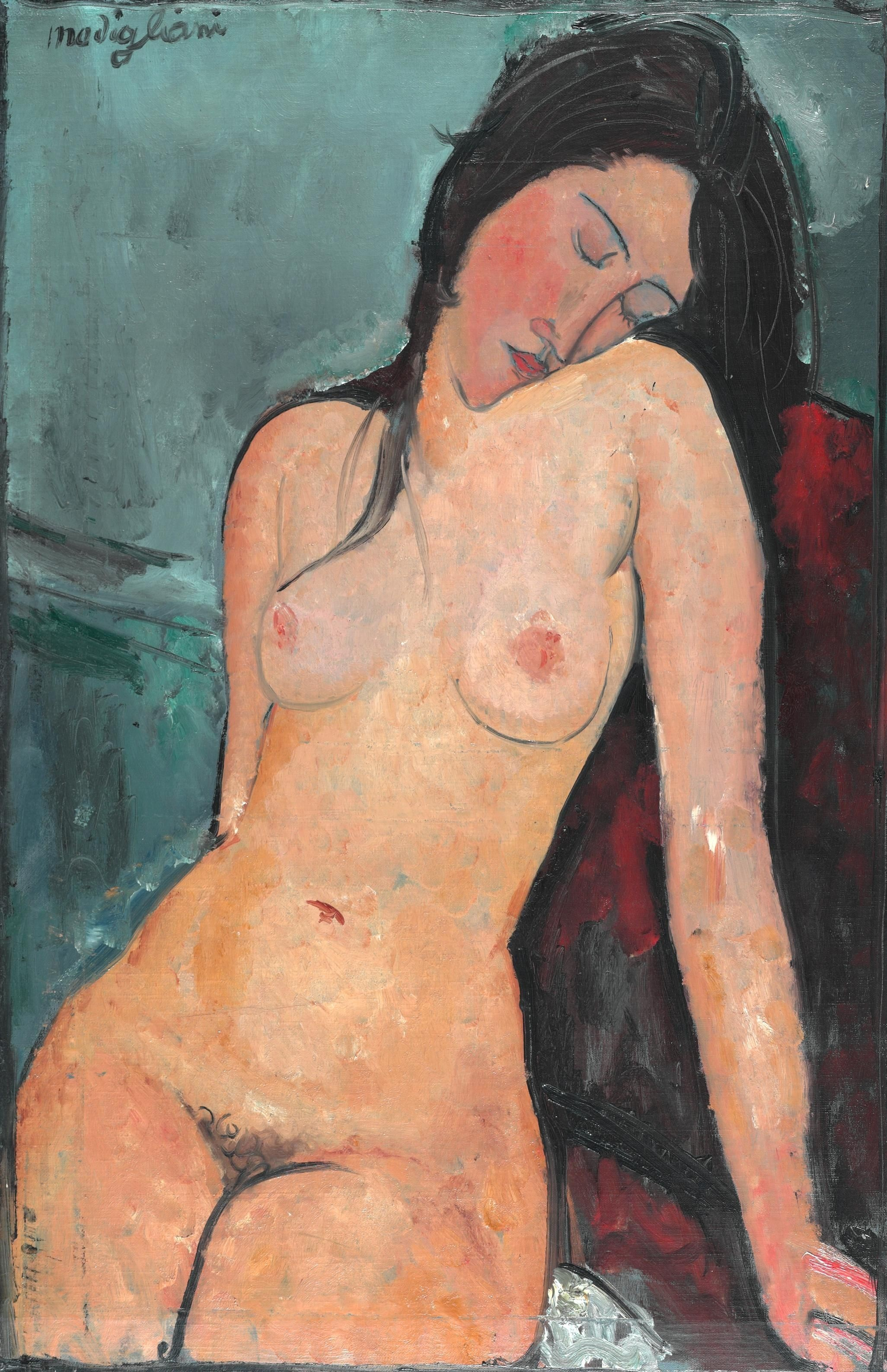
Iris Tree, c. 1916, Courtauld Institute of Art

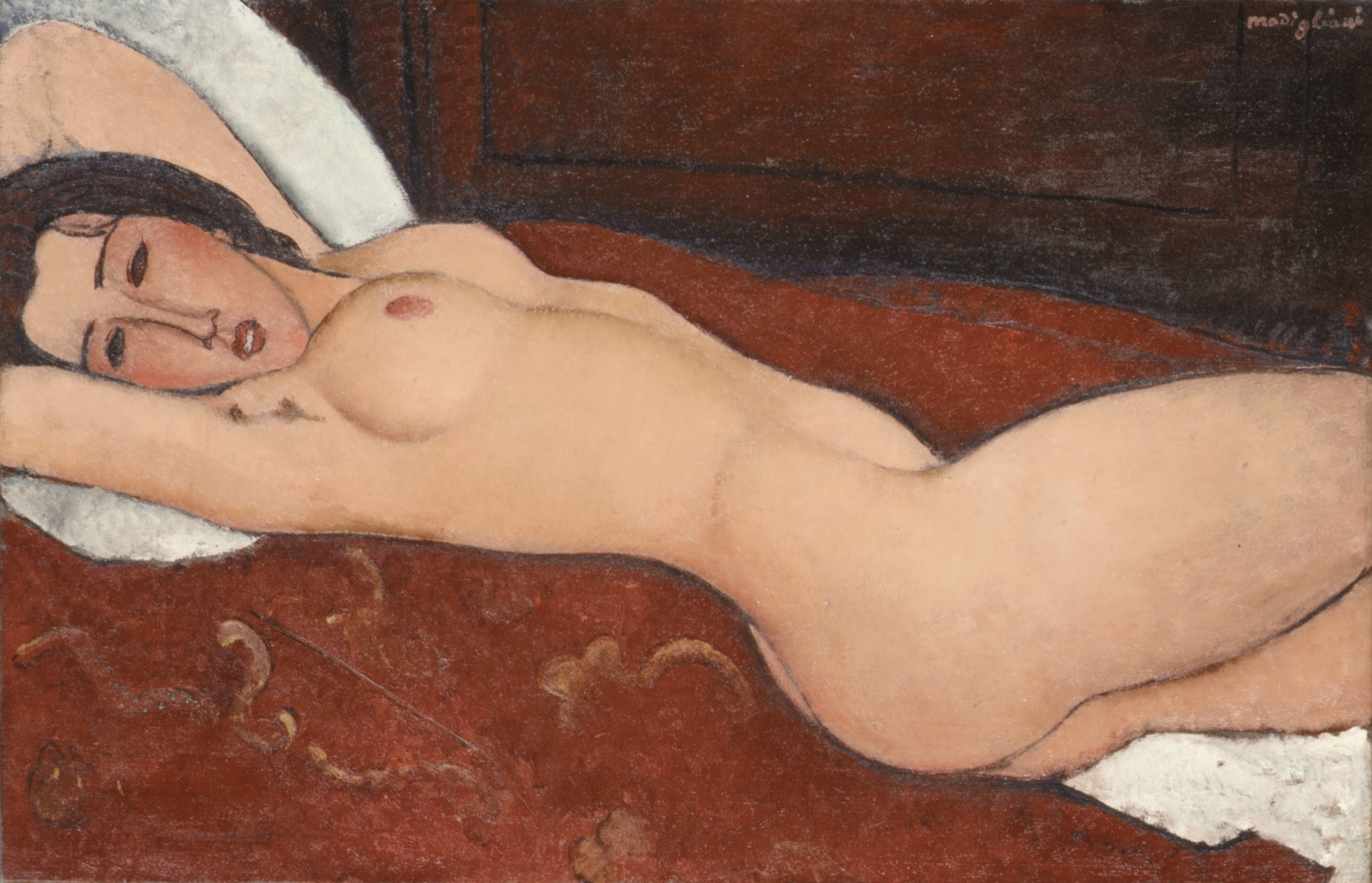
Reclining Nude, 1917, Metropolitan Museum of Art

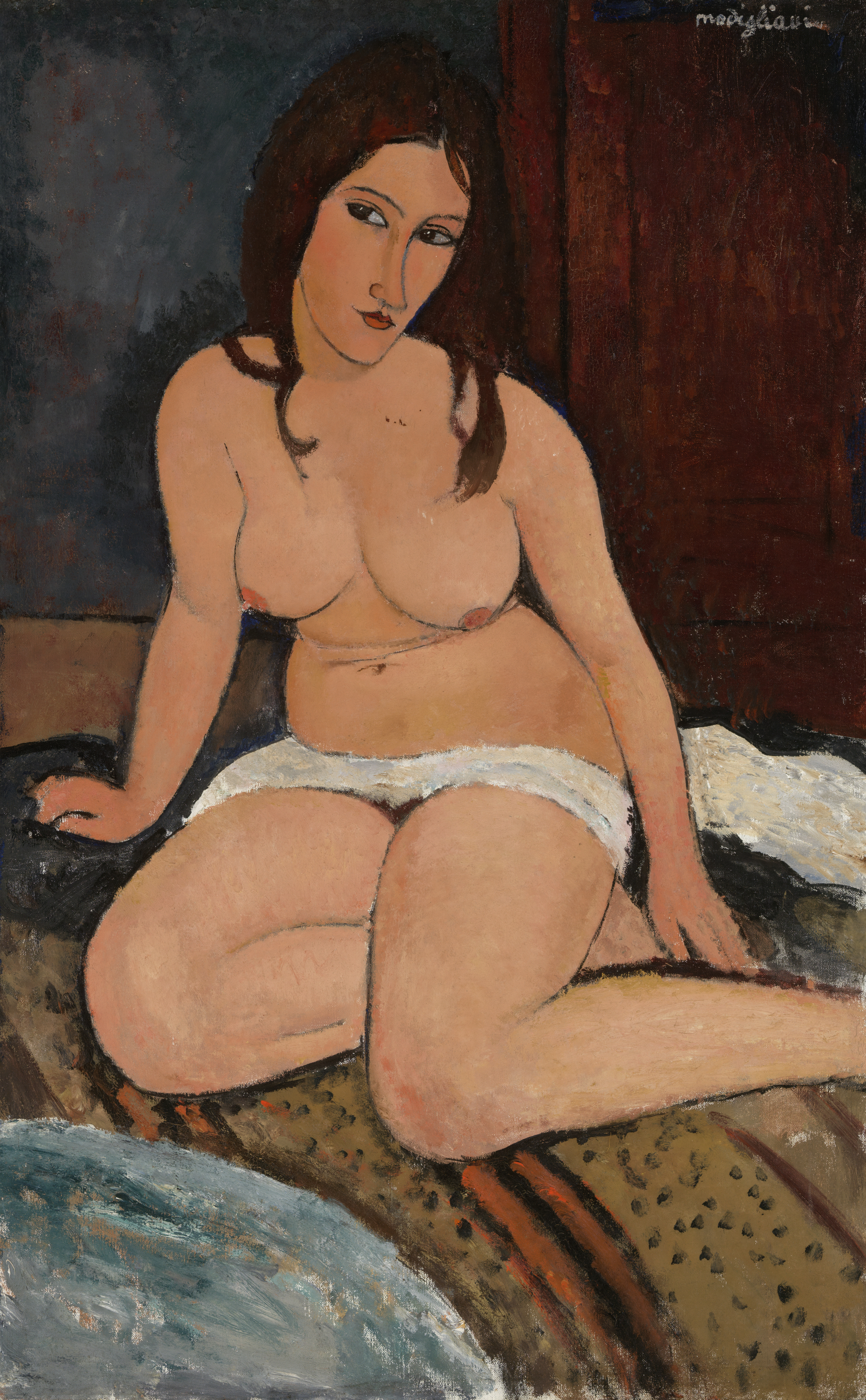
Seated Nude, 1917, Royal Museum of Fine Arts Antwerp

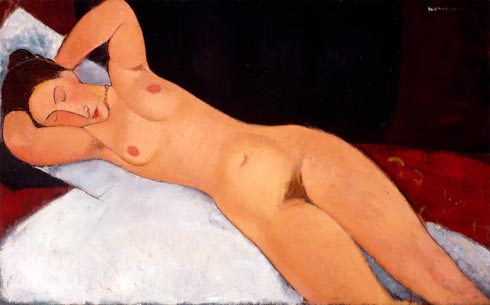
Nude, 1917, Solomon R. Guggenheim Museum

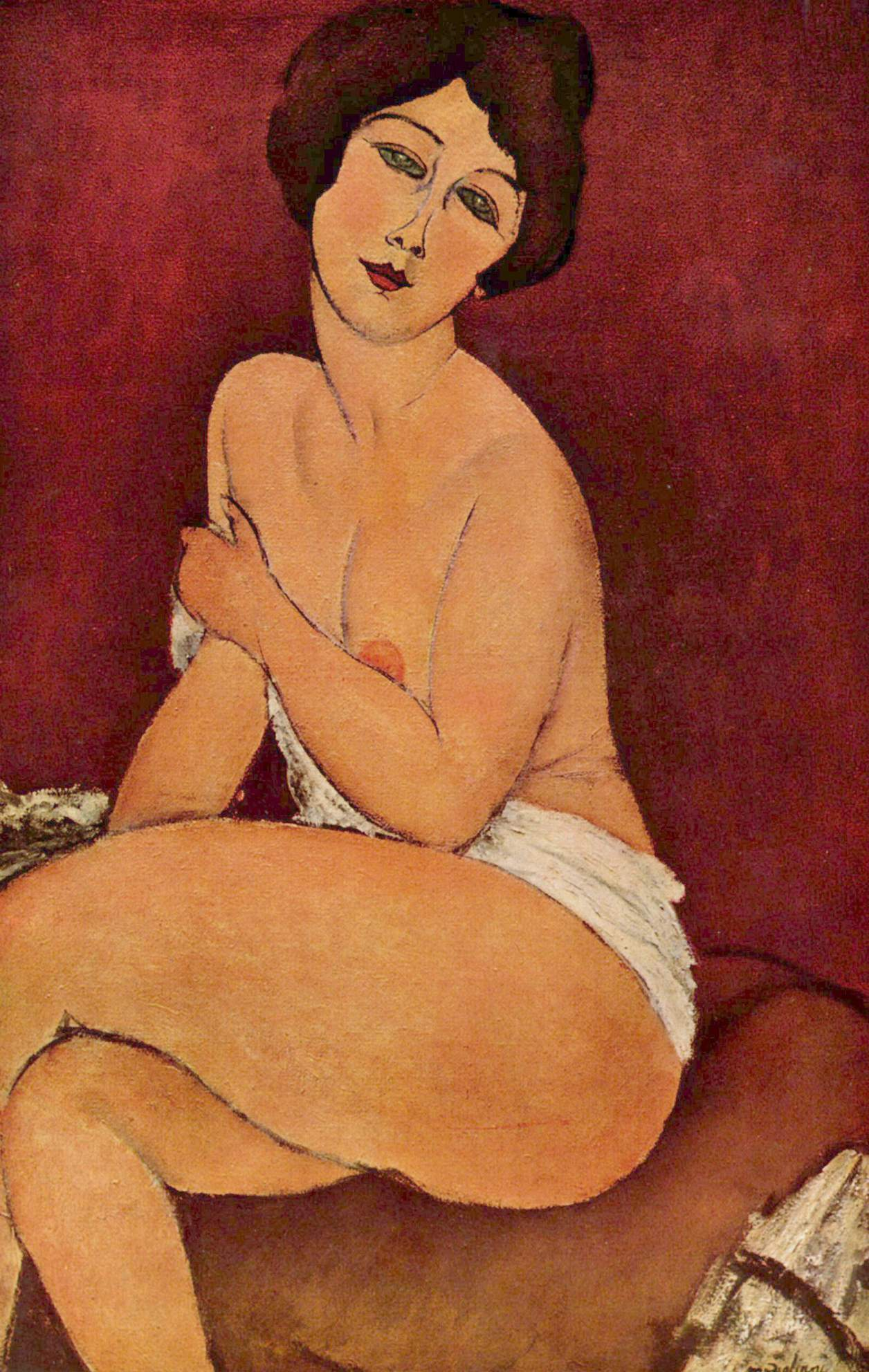
Nude Sitting on a Divan ("La Belle Romaine"), 1917

Nude on a Blue Cushion, 1917, National Gallery of Art

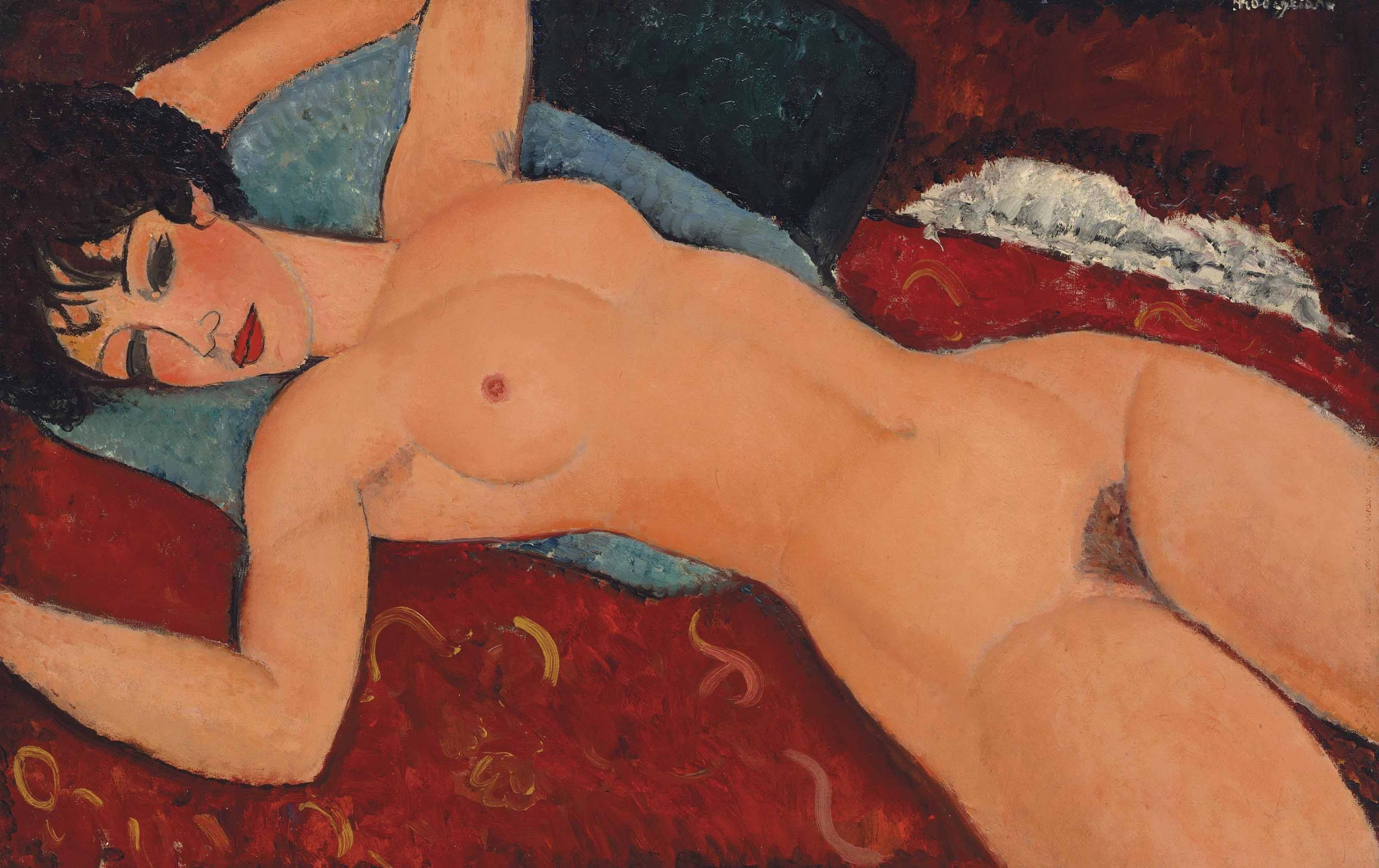
Nu couché, 1917–18, sold for $170.4 million in 2015 to Liu Yiqian

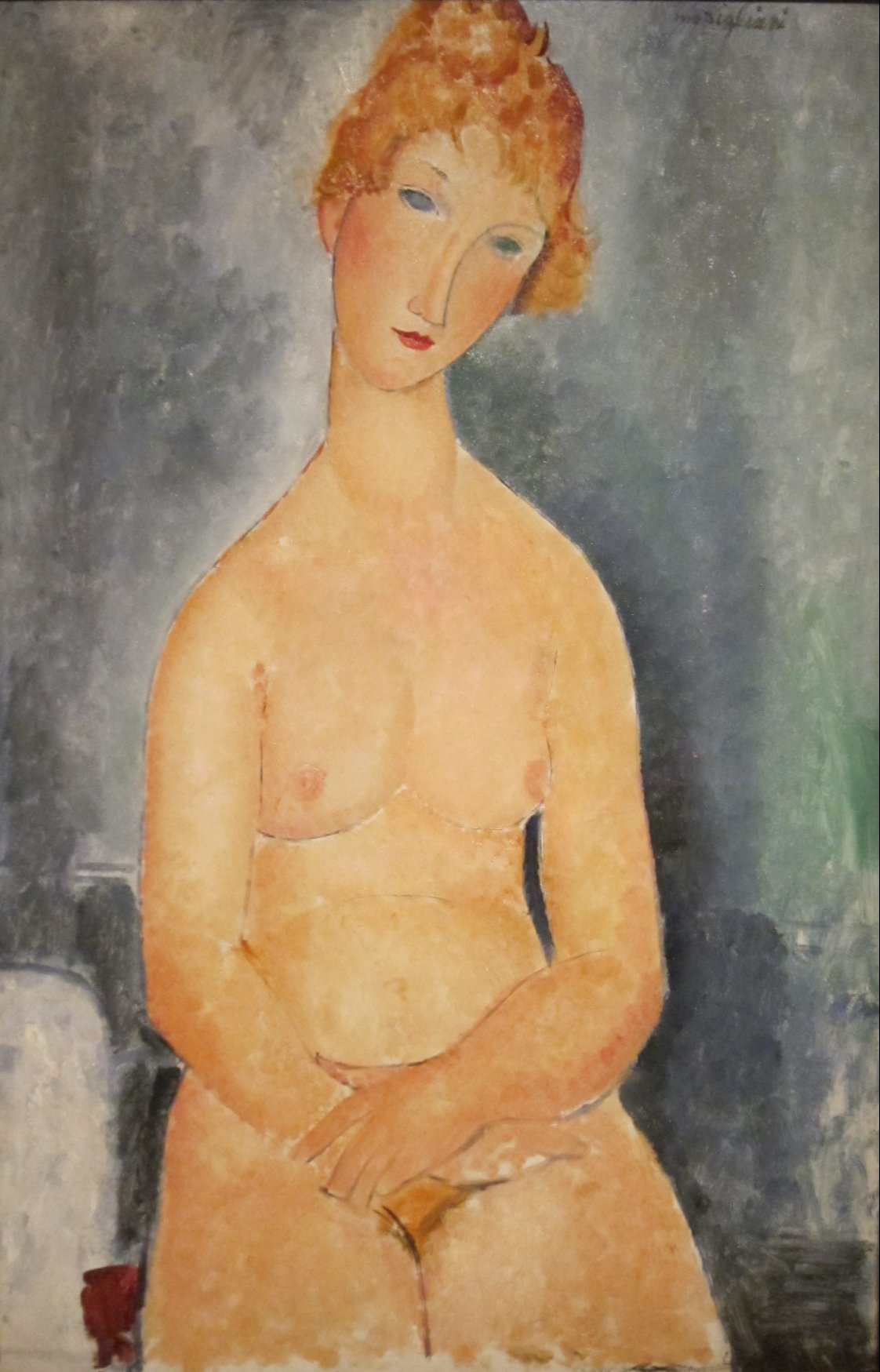
Seated Nude, 1918, Honolulu Museum of Art

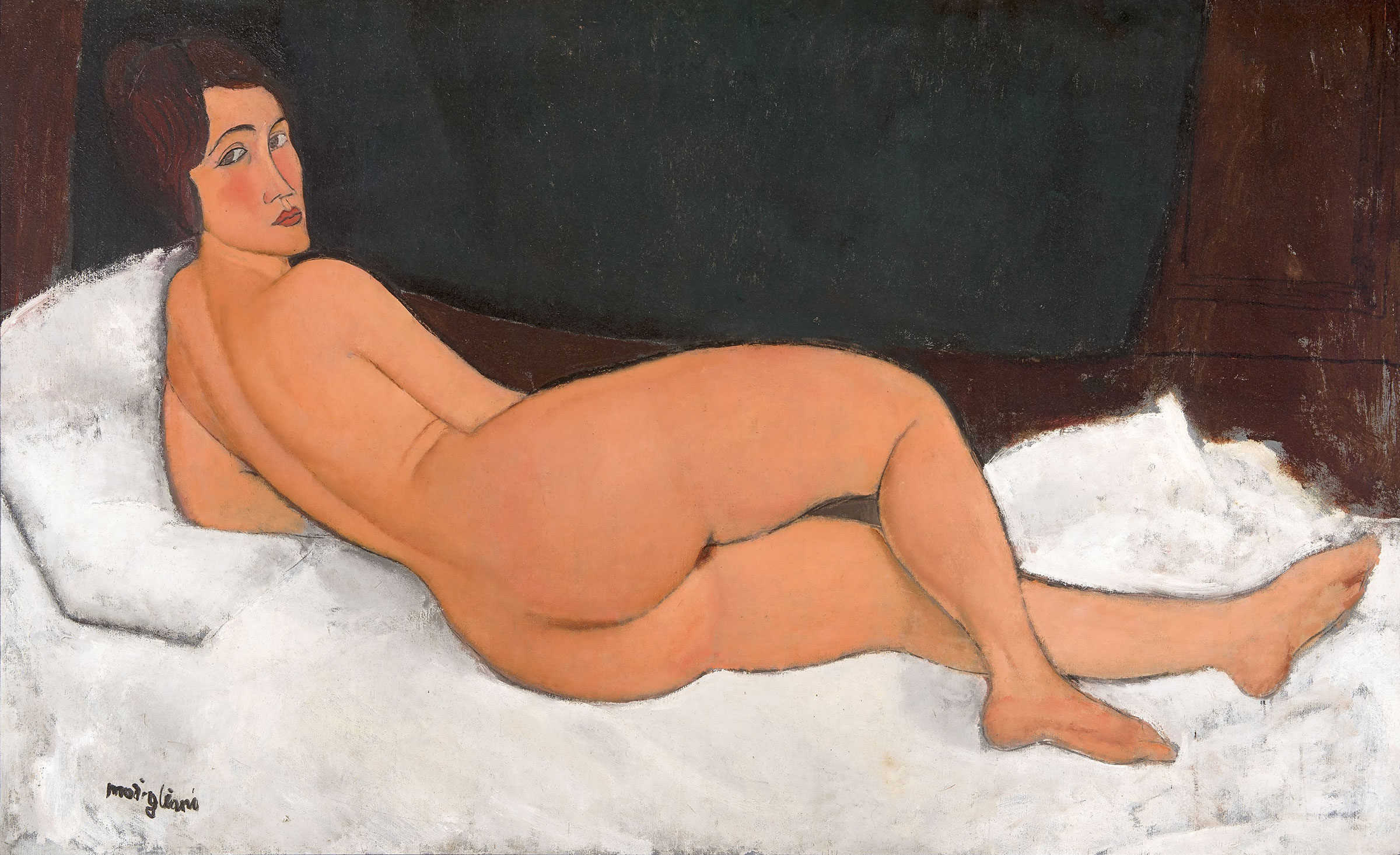
Nu couché (sur le côté gauche), 1917

=== Nice ===
On a trip to Nice, which had been conceived and organised by Zborowski, Modigliani, Foujita, and other artists tried to sell their works to rich tourists. Modigliani managed to sell a few pictures, but only for a few francs each. Despite this, during this time he produced most of the paintings that later became his most popular and valued works.

During his lifetime, he sold a number of his works, but never for any great amount of money. What funds he did receive soon vanished for his habits.

== Jeanne Hébuterne ==
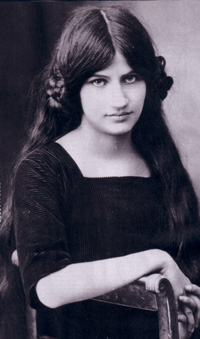
Jeanne Hébuterne

In the spring of 1917, the Ukrainian sculptor Chana Orloff introduced him to a 19-year-old art student named Jeanne Hébuterne who had posed for Tsuguharu Foujita. From a conservative bourgeois background, Hébuterne was renounced by her devout Roman Catholic family for her liaison with Jewish Modigliani, whom they saw as little more than a debauched derelict. Despite her family's objections, soon they were living together.

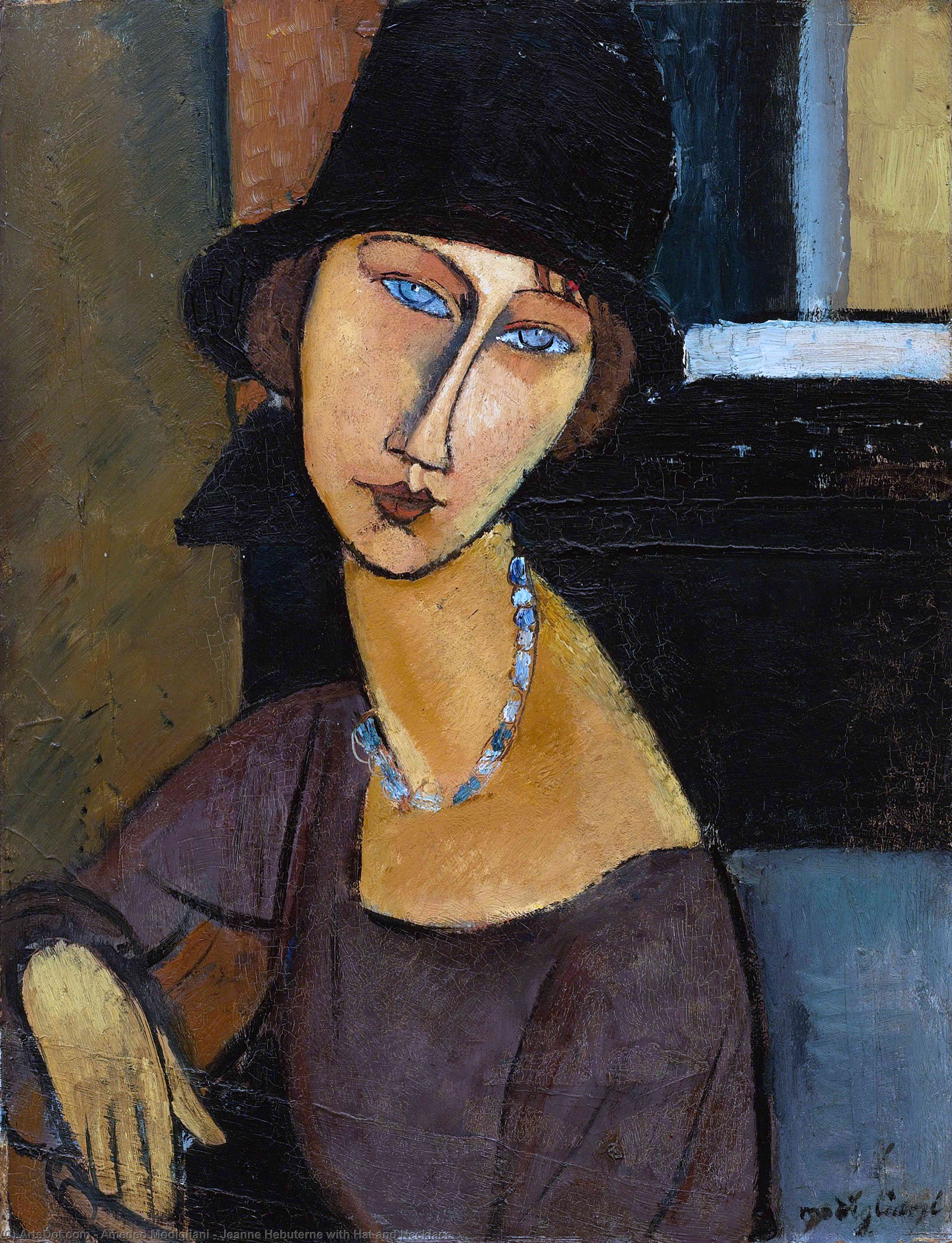
Jeanne Hébuterne with Hat and Necklace, 1917

Modigliani ended his relationship with the English poet and art critic Beatrice Hastings. A short time later, Hébuterne and Modigliani moved together into a studio on the Rue de la Grande Chaumière. Jeanne began to pose for him and appears in several of his paintings. Jeanne Hébuterne became a principal subject for Modigliani's art. Modigliani was known to be abusive towards his lovers. Hébuterne was suffering from depression after becoming pregnant for the second time.

Towards the end of the First World War, early in 1918, Modigliani left Paris with Hébuterne to escape from the war and travelled to Nice and Cagnes-sur-Mer. They would spend a year in France. During that time, they had a busy social life with many friends, including Pierre-Auguste Renoir, Pablo Picasso, Giorgio de Chirico and André Derain.

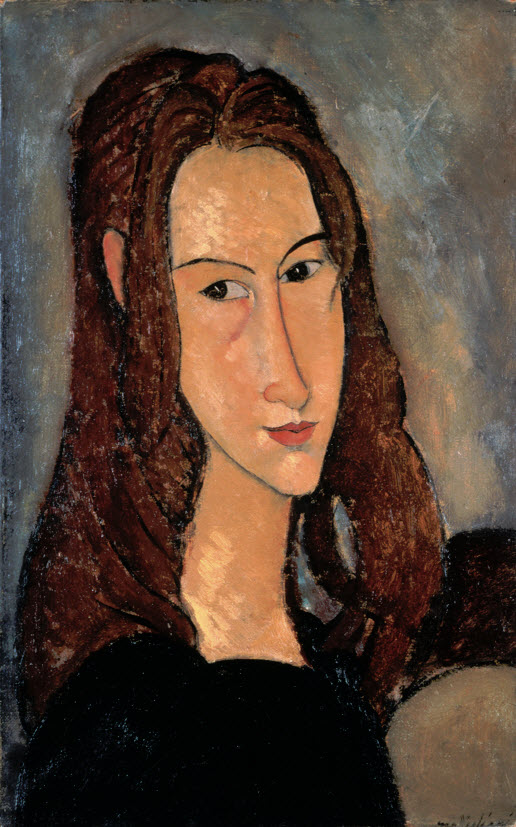
Portrait of Jeanne Hébuterne, 1918

After he and Hébuterne moved to Nice on 29 November 1918, she gave birth to a daughter whom they named Jeanne (1918–1984). Modigliani already had a son from his relationship with Simone Thiroux, Gérard Thiroux (1917–2004), and at least two other extramarital children. In May 1919, they returned to Paris with their infant daughter and moved into an apartment on the rue de la Grande Chaumière.

Hébuterne became pregnant again. Modigliani then got engaged to her, but Jeanne's parents were against the marriage, especially because of Modigliani's reputation as an alcoholic and drug user. However, Modigliani officially recognised her daughter as his child. The wedding plans were shattered independently of Jeanne's parents' resistance when Modigliani discovered he had a severe form of tuberculosis.

== Death and funeral ==
Although he continued to paint, Modigliani's health deteriorated rapidly, and his alcohol-induced blackouts became more frequent.

In 1920, after not hearing from him for several days, a neighbour checked on the family and found Modigliani in bed, delirious and holding onto Hébuterne. A doctor was summoned, but little could be done because Modigliani was in the final stage of his disease, tubercular meningitis. He died on 24 January 1920, at the Hôpital de la Charité.

There was an enormous funeral, attended by many from the artistic communities in Montmartre and Montparnasse. When Modigliani died, 21-year-old Hébuterne was eight months pregnant with their second child. The day after Modigliani's death, Hébuterne was taken to her parents' home. There, inconsolable, she threw herself out of a fifth-floor window, killing herself and her unborn child.

Modigliani was buried in Père Lachaise Cemetery. Hébuterne was buried at the Cimetière de Bagneux near Paris, and it was not until 1930 that her embittered family allowed her body to be moved to rest beside Modigliani. A single tombstone honours them both. His epitaph reads: "Struck down by death at the moment of glory". Hers reads: "Devoted companion to the extreme sacrifice".

Managing only one solo exhibition in his life and giving his work away in exchange for meals in restaurants, Modigliani died destitute.

== Legacy ==
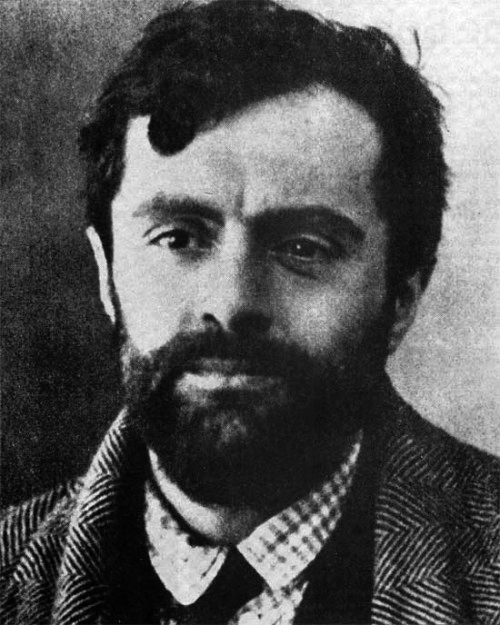
Modigliani in 1919, near the end of his life

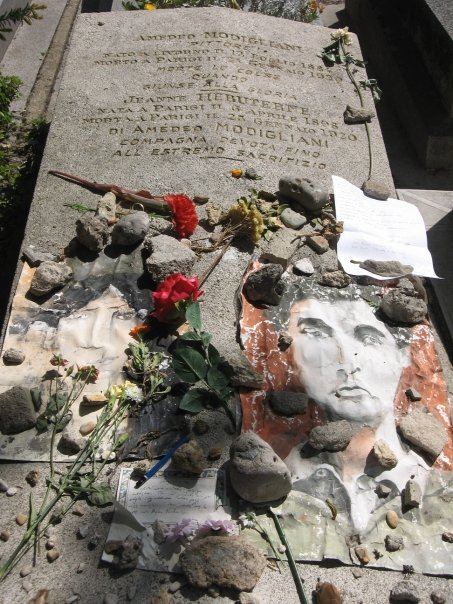
Grave of Modigliani and Hébuterne in Père Lachaise Cemetery

=== Influences ===
The linear form of African sculpture and the depictive humanism of the figurative Renaissance painters informed his work. Working during that fertile period of "isms", Cubism, Dadaism, Surrealism, Futurism, Modigliani did not choose to be categorised within any of these prevailing, defining confines. He was unclassifiable, stubbornly insisting on his difference. He was an artist putting down paint on canvas and creating works not to shock and outrage, but to say, "This is what I see."

More appreciated over the years by collectors than academicians and critics, Modigliani was indifferent to staking a claim for himself in the intellectual avant-garde of the art world. One can say he recognised the merit of Jean Cocteau's proclamation: "Ne t'attardes pas avec l'avant-garde" ("Don't wait with the avant-garde"). Pseudo-goitre, a medical condition, is also known as Modigliani syndrome. This name was derived from the curved neck of women in Modigliani's paintings, which appeared like pseudogoitre.

Since his death, Modigliani's reputation has soared. Nine novels, a play, a documentary, and three feature films have been devoted to his life. Modigliani's sister in Florence adopted his daughter, Jeanne (1918–1984). As an adult, she wrote a biography of her father titled Modigliani: Man and Myth.

=== Catalogues raisonnés ===
The Modigliani estate is one of the most problematic in the art world. There are at least five catalogues raisonnés of the artist's work, including two volumes by Ambrogio Ceroni, last updated in 1972. Arthur Pfannstiel (1929 and 1956) and Joseph Lanthemann's (1970) books are widely dismissed today. Milanese scholar Osvaldo Patani produced three volumes: paintings (1991), drawings (1992) and one on the Paul Alexandre period (1994), while Christian Parisot has published Volumes I, II and IV (in 1970, 1971 and 1996) of a catalogue raisonné.

In 2006, about 6,000 documents from the estate—believed to be the only ones existing—were moved permanently from France to Italy. Parisot, as president of the Modigliani Institut Archives Légales in Rome, had the legal right to authenticate Modigliani's work. In 2013, Parisot was arrested by the Italian Art forgery unit after a two-year investigation (following a largely advertised exhibition in Catania, presenting original artworks); the police seized works attributed to the artist, along with suspect authenticity certificates.

Over four decades, the French art historian Marc Restellini prepared a Modigliani catalogue raisonné. The six volume catalogue is expected to be published by Yale University Press on 21 April 2026 (ISBN 978-0-300-25676-5). In connection with the publication Pace plans to hold a day long symposium on 30 April 2026 titled From Myth to Method: Reimagining the Catalogue Raisonné, Inside Restellini’s Modigliani in its New York gallery.

The Modigliani Project, headed by Dr. Kenneth Wayne, was founded in 2012 to aid in the researching of Modigliani artworks. As part of this endeavor the organization is preparing a new catalogue raisonné of Modigliani's artwork.

=== Art market ===
In November 2010, a painting of a nude by Amedeo Modigliani, part of a series of nudes he created around 1917, sold for more than $68.9m (£42.7m) at an auction in New York—a record for the artist's work. Bidding for La Belle Romaine pushed its price well past its $40m (£24.8m) estimate. Modigliani's previous auction record was 43.2m euros (£35.8m), set earlier in 2010 in Paris. Another painting by the artist—Jeanne Hébuterne (au chapeau), one of the first portraits he painted of his lover—sold for $19.1m (£11.8m), much higher than its pre-sale estimate of $9–12m (£5.6–7.4m).

On 9 November 2015 the 1917 painting Nu couché, sold at Christie's in New York for US$170.4 million. On 14 May 2018 the 1917 painting Nu couché (sur le côté gauche) sold at Sotheby's in New York for $157.2 million. This was the highest auction price in Sotheby's history.

=== Forgeries ===
Modigliani is one of the most faked artists in the world. Rising prices for works attributed to him as well as the legend surrounding his short life have fueled a market for forgeries of both paintings and sculptures. In 1984, students carved three stone heads in a Modigliani style, causing a sensation when they were "discovered" in a canal in Livorno, Italy. Experts claimed they were authentic until the students released a video they had filmed of themselves making the heads with a Black and Decker drill. In 2018 twenty fake Modiglianis were seized at an exhibition in Genoa. Famous art forgers such as Elmyr de Hory admitted to creating many fake Modiglianis. Experienced art dealers such as Klaus Perls were tricked into purchasing fake Modigliani statues. It has been estimated that most artworks attributed to Modigliani are actually forgeries.

=== Cinema ===
Three films have been made about Modigliani: Les Amants de Montparnasse (1958), directed by Jacques Becker and starring Gérard Philipe as Modigliani; and Modigliani (2004), directed by Mick Davis and starring Andy García as Modigliani. In August 2022, Johnny Depp directed Modì, Three Days on the Wing of Madness, which he co-produced alongside Al Pacino and Barry Navidi, from a screenplay by Jerzy and Mary Kromolowski. Principal photography commenced in September 2023; the movie was released in 2024. In February 2025, it was announced that The Curse of Modigliani is set to be released later in 2025. The film was released on 7 December 2025. Directed by Diana Ringo and starring Edward Pishiyski, the film presents a modernised take on Modigliani’s life.

== Critical reactions ==
In 2011, Peter Schjeldahl, reviewing Meryle Secrest's book Modigliani: A Life, wrote:

I recall my thrilled first exposure, as a teenager, to one of his long-necked women, with their piquantly tipped heads and mask-like faces. The rakish stylization and the succulent color were easy to enjoy, and the payoff was sanguinely erotic in a way that endorsed my personal wishes to be bold and tender and noble, overcoming the wimp that I was. In that moment, I used up Modigliani's value for my life. But in museums ever since I have been happy to salute his pictures with residually grateful, quick looks.

Schjeldahl reports Secrest's speculation that Modigliani was happy to let people consider him an alcoholic and drug addict, "and thus to mistake the symptoms of his tuberculosis, which he kept a secret. Drunks were tolerated; carriers of infectious diseases were not."

== Selected works ==
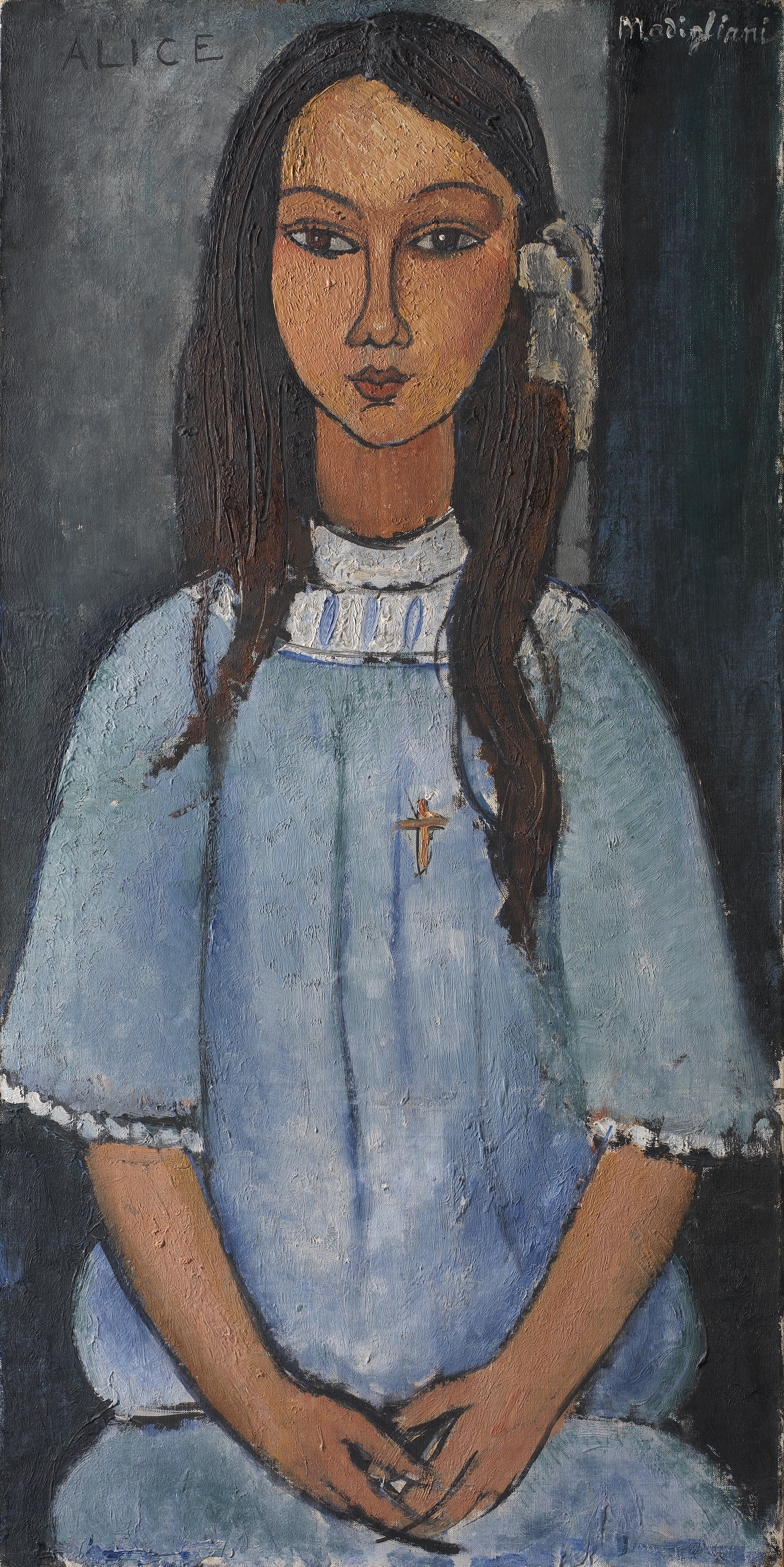
Alice, c. 1918, Danish National Gallery

=== Paintings ===
- Head of a Woman with a Hat (1907)
- Portrait of Juan Gris (1915)
- Portrait of Pablo Picasso (1915)
- Portrait of the Art Dealer Paul Guillaume (1916)
- Portrait of Jean Cocteau (1916)
- Jeanne Hébuterne with Hat and Necklace (1917)
- Nu couché (1917-1918)
- Seated Nude (c. 1918), Honolulu Museum of Art
- Portrait of Jeanne Hébuterne (1918)
- Jeanne Hébuterne aux épaules nues (1919)
- Woman with a Fan (1919), stolen from the Paris Modern Art Museum on 19 May 2010 and portrayed in the films Trance and Skyfall
- Portrait of Marios Varvoglis (1920; Modigliani's last painting)

=== Sculptures ===
Twenty-seven sculptures by Modigliani are known to exist.

- Tête (1910/1912)
- Head of a Woman (1910/1911).
- Head (1911–1913).
- Head (1911–1912).
- Head (1912).
- Rose Caryatid (1914).

== Selected exhibitions ==
- 1907 (October): 5th Salon d'automne, Grand Palais, Paris
- 1908 (October): 24th Salon des Independants, Paris
- 1910 (March–May): 26th Salon des Independants, Paris
- 1914 (20 May – 8 June): Whitechapel Art Gallery: 20th century art (a review of modern movements), London
- 1917 (3–30 December): Solo exhibition, Galerie Berthe Weill, Paris

== See also ==
- Nude Sitting on a Divan
- Nu couché
- Seated Man with a Cane
- Lille Métropole Museum of Modern, Contemporary and Outsider Art
- Painting the Century: 101 Portrait Masterpieces 1900–2000
- Hilla Rebay
