= Henry Keazor =

German art historian

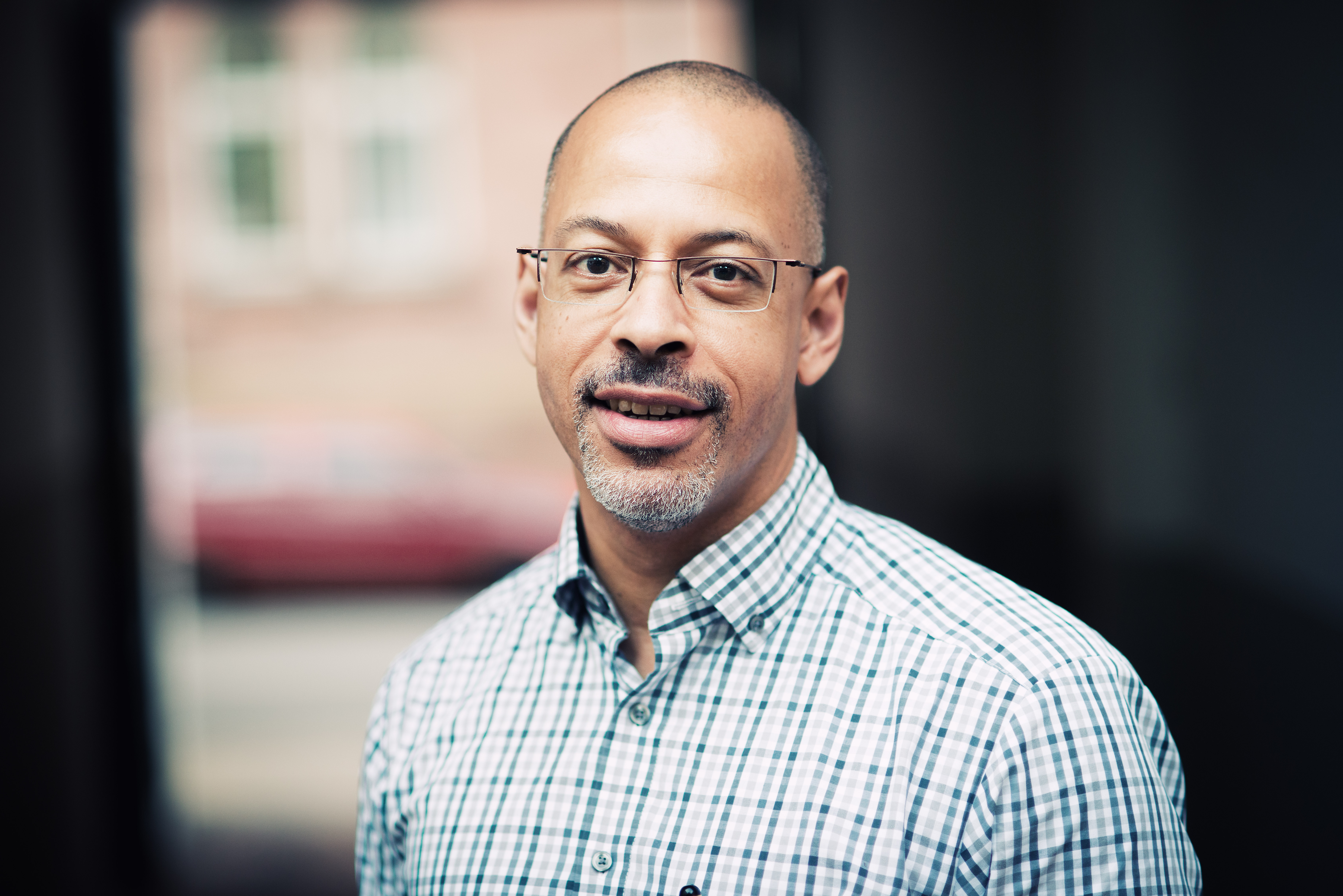
- Henry Keazor in 2016
- Born: 4 March 1965 (age 61); Heidelberg, West Germany
- Education: Heidelberg University
- Scientific career
- Fields: Art history
- Thesis: Poussins Parerga: Quellen, Entwicklung und Bedeutung der Kleinkompositionen in den Gemälden Nicolas Poussins (1996)
- Website: www.uni-heidelberg.de/fakultaeten/philosophie/zegk/iek/mitarbeiter/keazor/

Henry Keazor (born 4 March 1965) is a German art historian. He is a professor of art history at Heidelberg University.

== Career ==
Keazor studied art history, German literature, musicology and philosophy at the Heidelberg University and at the Sorbonne in Paris. In 1996 obtained his doctoral title with a Ph.D. dissertation on the French Baroque painter Nicolas Poussin. From 1996 to 1999, he was first fellow and then Scientific Assistant at the Istituto Germanico/Kunsthistorisches Institut in Florence. Afterwards, from 1999 to 2005, he was assistant professor at the Kunstgeschichtliches Institut of the Goethe University Frankfurt, where he did his habilitation in 2005 with a research thesis on the pictorial reform of the Early modern painter’s family of the Carracci from Bologna. Directly afterwards Keazor became guest professor at the Johannes Gutenberg University of Mainz before he then, from 2006 on, got the Heisenberg-fellowship of the German Research Foundation (Deutsche Forschungsgemeinschaft: DFG). Eventually, in September 2008, he was appointed Chair of Art History at Saarland University.

In September 2012, Keazor changed to the Institut für Europäische Kunstgeschichte of the Heidelberg University where he assumed the succession of Raphael Rosenberg, whose post, the professorship of early modern and contemporary art history, had been vacant since 2009. At the same time, he also began to in the executive board of the Arts Council of Heidelberg (Heidelberger Kunstverein). Since 2015, he is a full member of the Heidelberg Academy of Sciences (Heidelberger Akademie der Wissenschaften).

In 2020 Keazor – among other for his publications on Nicolas Poussin and Jean Nouvel – was awarded with the "Prix du Rayonnement de la langue et de la littérature françaises" of the Académie française, which is given to French and foreign personalities for outstanding services to the French language and literature.

== Main research focuses ==
Keazor’s research focuses on French and Italian Baroque Art as well as on Early Modern illustrations of the discovery of America (and here especially those published by the Belgian artist Theodor de Bry), modernist and contemporary architecture (here especially the architectural language of Jean Nouvel), the impact and reception of visual art in literature and media (such as for example in the TV-series The Simpsons), music videos, the image of the astronaut in arts and media and art forgery. In the context of the latter topic, he appears at the beginning and the end of Arne Birkenstock’s documentary “Beltracchi: The Art of Forgery” from 2014 as the interview partner of art forger Wolfgang Beltracchi. Hereby he is able to coax the statement out of Beltracchi that according to himself there is no “lifeblood” invested and infused into his forgeries. This seems to stand in conflict with an earlier statement of Beltracchi who, during his trial, had emphasized that he had only been interested in painting, not in money. In 2015, Keazor also curated the exhibition “Fake: Forgeries by the Book” (Fake: Fälschungen, wie sie im Buche stehen) in the Heidelberg University Library where, for the first time, a fake Beltracchi’s after Johannes Molzahn was directly confronted to an original by Molzahn, thus giving the audience a chance to compare the artistic quality of both works. In Spring 2021, he founded the first university forgery archive dedicated to teaching and research at the Institute for European Art History at the University of Heidelberg under the acronym HeFäStuS (= HEidelberger FÄlschungs-STUdien-Sammlung). With the collection, named after the god for fire and crafts Hephaistos (Latin Hephaestus), art forgeries provided by the State Criminal Police Offices Berlin, München and Stuttgart from their evidence rooms are available for teaching. The goal is not only to sensitize students to forgeries they may encounter later in their careers, but also to use these objects, which (unlike works kept in museums) allow direct examination, to convey much of what is also relevant to art sold as originals (style, painting technique, provenance, etc.).

== Selected publications ==
- Poussins Parerga: Quellen, Entwicklung und Bedeutung der Kleinkompositionen in den Gemälden Nicolas Poussins. Schnell und Steiner, Regensburg 1998, ISBN 3-7954-1146-7 (book publication of the Ph.D.thesis from 1996).
- Distruggere la maniera? Die Carracci-Postille. Rombach Verlag, Freiburg im Breisgau 2002, ISBN 3-7930-9307-7.
- As editor: Psychische Energien bildender Kunst: Festschrift für Klaus Herding. DuMont Literatur- und Kunstverlag, Cologne 2002, ISBN 3-8321-7225-4.
- With Thorsten Wübbena: Video thrills the radio star: Musikvideos: Geschichte, Themen, Analysen. Transcript, Bielefeld 2005, ISBN 3-89942-383-6.
- Nicolas Poussin: 1594–1665. Taschen, Cologne 2007, ISBN 978-3-8228-5319-1.
- „Il vero modo“. Die Malereireform der Carracci. Gebrüder Mann Verlag, Berlin 2007, ISBN 978-3-7861-2561-7 (book publication of the habilitation thesis 2005).
- With Thorsten Wübbena: Rewind, play, fast forward: the past, present and future of the music video. Transcript, Bielefeld 2010, ISBN 978-3-8376-1185-4.
- With Fabienne Liptay and Susanne Marschall as author and editor: Filmkunst: Studien an den Grenzen der Künste und Medien. Schüren Verlag, Marburg 2011, ISBN 978-3-89472-666-9.
- With Hans Giessen and Thorsten Wübbena: Zur ästhetischen Umsetzung von Musikvideos im Kontext von Handhelds. ART-Dok, Publikationsplattform Kunstgeschichte, 2012 (online).
- As author and editor: Hitchcock und die Künste. Schüren, Marburg 2013, ISBN 978-3-89472-828-1.
- With Tina Öcal as author and editor: Der Fall Beltracchi und die Folgen. Interdisziplinäre Fälschungsforschung heute. De Gruyter, Berlin 2014, ISBN 978-3-11-031589-9
- Täuschend echt! Eine Geschichte der Kunstfälschung. Wissenschaftliche Buchgesellschaft/Theiss, Darmstadt 2015, ISBN 9783806230321
- As author and together with Maria Effinger as editor: FAKE: Fälschungen, wie sie im Buche stehen (Ausstellungskatalog UB Heidelberg). Winter Verlag, Heidelberg 2016, ISBN 978-3-8253-6621-6
- As author and editor: `We are all astronauts´. The Image of the Space Traveler in Arts and Media, Berlin 2019, ISBN 978-3-95808-213-7
