= Jeanne Hébuterne with Bare Shoulders =

1919 painting by Amedeo Modigliani

- Artist: Amedeo Modigliani
- Year: 1919
- Medium: oil on canvas
- Dimensions: 91,4 cm × 73 cm (360 in × 29 in)
- Owner: private collection

Jeanne Hébuterne with Bare Shoulders (French: Jeanne Hébuterne aux épaules nues) is an oil on canvas painting by Italian painter Amedeo Modigliani created in 1919. Modigliani depicted Jeanne Hébuterne in more than twenty works but never nude.

== Description ==
Modigliani met Jeanne Hébuterne, a 19-year-old art student, in the spring of 1917, through the Russian sculptor Chana Orloff. Soon Modigliani ended his relationship with the English poet and art critic Beatrice Hastings, and shortly later Hébuterne and Modigliani moved together into a studio on the Rue de la Grande Chaumière. Hébuterne began to pose for him and appeared in several of his paintings. In March 1918 Modigliani and Hébuterne moved to Nice where their daughter Jeanne was born in November 1918. Jeanne Hébuterne became a principal subject for Modigliani's art. He transformed Hébuterne into an idyllic symbol of a modern woman.

They returned to Paris in June 1919 and Hébuterne got pregnant for the second time. Shortly after Modigliani's death, while being eight month pregnant, Hébuterne committed suicide by throwing herself from the window of her parents’ apartment. It happened the following day after Modigliani's death of tubercular meningitis on 25 November 1920.

== Provenance ==
According to Marc Restellini publications, the painting belonged to Roger Dutilleul from 1922 to 1940, and since that time, it is in the property of the private collection in Paris.

== Exhibitions ==
- Paris, 1935
- Tokyo, Modigliani et le primitivisme, The National Art Center, 2008 (curated by Marc Restellini) - n° 59
- Osaka, Modigliani et le primitivisme, The National Museum of Art, 2008 (curated by Marc Restellini) - n° 59
- South Korea, Amedeo Modigliani and Jeanne Hébuterne, Aram & Harmony Art Museum of Goyang, 2008
