= Werner Spies =

German art historian, journalist and exhibition organizer

Werner Spies (born 1 April 1937 in Tübingen) is a German art historian, journalist and exhibition organizer. From 1997 to 2000, he was a director of the Centre Georges Pompidou in Paris. Klaus Albrecht Schröder, director of the Albertina in Vienna, has called Spies "one of the most influential art historians of the 20th century."

== Life and work ==
In his youth, Spies worked as a writer of feuilletons for German newspapers. He studied art history, philosophy and French literature at the universities of Vienna, Tübingen and Paris. He completed his PhD thesis and Habilitationsschrift, both in the history of arts, at the Rheinische Friedrich-Wilhelms-Universität Bonn.

He has lived in Paris since 1960. From 1975 to 2002 he was a professor of the history of arts at the Kunstakademie Düsseldorf. He also writes articles for the Frankfurter Allgemeine Zeitung.

As an expert on and friend of Max Ernst and Pablo Picasso, he has written many books and organized major exhibitions on these artists. He compiled the first catalogue raisonné of Picasso's sculptures in 1971, and organized the first Max Ernst retrospective at the Grand Palais in Paris in 1975. On his suggestion, photographer Andreas Gursky donated PCF (2003), his photograph of the headquarters of the French Communist Party, designed by Oscar Niemeyer, to the Centre Pompidou in 2010.

In his later years, Spies was fooled by art forger Wolfgang Beltracchi's forgeries of five works by Max Ernst. Spies, who first met Ernst in 1966 and is the leading expert on his work, mistakenly issued certificates of authenticity for the copies of the surrealist's work. One of the certificates was given to Beltracchi's fake "La Forêt (2)", which subsequently allowed controversial Swiss art dealer Yves Bouvier, whom Spies had put in contact with Helene Beltracchi, to sell it to a private company for $2.3 million. The painting was eventually sold to New York City publisher Daniel Filipacchi for $7 million.

On 24 May 2013, Spies was convicted by the high court in Nanterre and ordered to pay €652,883 to the collector who purchased in 2004 an alleged Max Ernst painting, Tremblement de Terre, that he had wrongly authenticated. However, the decision was overturned by the Court of Appeal of Versailles, which ruled that Spies had "expresse[d] an opinion outside of a determined transaction" and could not therefore "be charged with a responsibility equivalent to that of an expert consulted in the context of a sale". The Court further stated that it "cannot be required of the author of a catalogue raisonné to subject each work in a catalogue published under his responsibility to the execution of a scientific expert assessment, which requires the removal of fragments of the work and represents a significant cost".

== Publications ==
- Pour Daniel-Henry Kahnweiler. Festschrift für Daniel-Henry Kahnweiler, ed. Werner Spies and Michel Leiris, Stuttgart 1965
- Mein imaginäres Museum/Jean Tardieu, aus dem Französischen übersetzt von Gerhard M. Neumann und Werner Spies; mit einem Nachwort versehen von Werner Spies, Frankfurt am Main 1965
- Max Ernst: Frottagen, EA Stuttgart 1968
- Pablo Picasso-Traum und Lüge Francos, Frankfurt 1968
- Vasarely, EA Stuttgart 1969 ISBN 3-7701-0538-9
- Albers (in Kunst heute, vol. 15), Stuttgart 1970 ISBN 3-7757-0007-2
- Rudolf Hoflehner, Krieauer Kreaturen, Vienna, Munich 1971 ISBN 3-7031-0193-8
- Pablo Picasso: Das plastische Werk, EA Stuttgart 1971 ISBN 3-7757-0012-9
- Victor Vasarely, EA Cologne 1971
- Die Rückkehr der Schönen Gärtnerin: Max Ernst 1950–1970, EA Cologne 1971 ISBN 3-7701-0543-5
- Max Ernst, Collagen: Inventar und Widerspruch, Cologne 1974 ISBN 3-7701-0652-0
- Max Ernst Oeuvrekatalog, 6 volumes, ed. Werner Spies, Sigrid Metken and Günter Metken, 1975–1976
- Max Ernst: Vox Angelica, Basel 1975
- Max Ernst, Tokyo 1977
- Max Ernst: Bücher und Grafiken; eine Ausstellung des Institutes für Auslandsbeziehungen, Stuttgart 1977
- Christo, the Running Fence. 25 November 1977 – 8 January 1978, Kestner-Gesellschaft, Hannover, EA Stuttgart 1977 ISBN 3-7757-0121-4
- Max Klinger: 1857–1920; l'oeuvre gravé; exposition au Centre Culturel Allemand, Goethe-Inst. Paris du 10 mars au 29 avril 1977, Stuttgart 1977
- Aggressivität und Erhebung, in: Max Ernst Retrospektive 1979, in collaboration with Thomas W. Gaehtgens, Eduard Trier and Günter Metken, Munich, Berlin 1979
- Max Ernst: Frottagen, Collagen, Zeichnungen, Zurich, Frankfurt, Munich 1978
- Das Auge am Tatort, 80 Begegnungen mit Kunst und Künstlern, Munich 1979 ISBN 3-7913-0484-4
- Pablo Picasso: eine Ausstellung zum 100. Geburtstag; Werke aus der Sammlung Marina Picasso; exhibition catalog, Munich 1981 ISBN 3-7913-0523-9
- Max Ernst – Loplop: die Selbstdarstellung des Künstlers, Munich 1982 ISBN 3-7913-0546-8
- Picasso, das plastische Werk. Exhibition catalog, Nationalgalerie Berlin, Staatliche Museen Preußischer Kulturbesitz, 7 October – 27 November 1983; Kunsthalle Düsseldorf, 11 December 1983 – 29 January 1984; in collaboration with Christine Piot, Stuttgart 1983
- Christo: Surrounded Islands, EA Cologne 1984
- Max Ernst – les collages. Inventaire et contradictions, Paris 1984
- Picasso: Pastelle, Zeichnungen, Aquarelle; exhibition catalog, Kunsthalle Tübingen, 5 April – 25 May 1986; Kunstsammlung Nordrhein-Westfalen, Düsseldorf, 6 June – 27. July 1986; Stuttgart 1986 ISBN 3-7757-0213-X
- Fernando Botero: Bilder, Zeichnungen, Skulpturen; anlässlich der Ausstellung Fernando Botero – Bilder, Zeichnungen, Skulpturen, Kunsthalle der Hypo-Kulturstiftung, Munich, 4 July – 7 September 1986; Kunsthalle Bremen, 11 January – 1 March 1987; Schirn Kunsthalle Frankfurt, 12 March 1987 – 10 May 1987; Munich 1986 ISBN 3-7913-0774-6
- Cars: die letzten Bilder/Andy Warhol, Stuttgart 1988 ISBN 3-7757-0249-0
- Kontinent Picasso: ausgewählte Aufsätze aus 2 Jahrzehnten, Munich 1988 ISBN 3-7913-0891-2
- Die Welt der Collage, Tübingen, Bern, Düsseldorf 1988
- Rosarot vor Miami: Ausflüge zu Kunst und Künstlern unseres Jahrhunderts, Munich 1989 ISBN 3-7913-1017-8
- Pablo Picasso – der Zeichner: 300 Zeichnungen und Graphiken 1893–1972, ed. Jean Jouvet, with essays by Werner Spies, Zurich 1989 ISBN 3-257-21747-1
- Max Ernst- The Invention of the Surrealist Universe, New York, London, 1990
- Dressierte Malerei – entrückte Utopie: zur französischen Kunst des 19. Jahrhunderts, Stuttgart 1990 ISBN 3-7757-0289-X
- Max Ernst: Retrospektive zum 100. Geburtstag; anlässlich der Ausstellung Max Ernst – Retrospektive zum 100. Geburtstag, Tate Gallery, London (13 February – 21 April 1991); Musée Nationale d'Art Moderne, Centre Georges Pompidou, Paris (28 November 1991 – 27 January 1992)]; ed. Werner Spies; with contributions by Karin von Maur, Munich 1991 ISBN 3-7913-1122-0
- Picasso, die Zeit nach Guernica: 1937–1973; anlässlich der Ausstellung Picasso – Die Zeit nach Guernica 1937–1973, Nationalgalerie Berlin; Kunsthalle der Hypo-Kulturstiftung, Munich; Hamburger Kunsthalle, December 1992 – August 1993, Stuttgart 1993 ISBN 3-7757-0384-5
- An Open-ended Oeuvre in Dada and the Dawn of Surrealism; The Museum of Modern Art, New York, The Menil Collection, Houston, The Art Institute of Chicago 1993
- Picasso – die Welt der Kinder, Munich 1994 ISBN 3-7913-1346-0
- Schnitt durch die Welt: Aufsätze zu Kunst und Literatur, Stuttgart 1995 ISBN 3-89322-732-6
- Pablo Picasso: Wege zur Skulptur; die Carnets Paris und Dinard von 1928; anlässlich der Ausstellung im Wilhelm-Lehmbruck-Museum Duisburg, 29 January – 2 April 1995; der Hamburger Kunsthalle, 16 June – 13 August 1995; München, New York 1995 ISBN 3-7913-1436-X
- Max Ernst-Skulpturen, Häuser, Landschaften; Centre Georges Pompidou 1998, Düsseldorf Kunstsammlung Nordrhein-Westfalen 1995
- Passion and Eroticism: The Late Graphic Works by Pablo Picasso; From the Piero Crommelynck Collection; Tokyo 1997
- "Die Dauer des Blitzes", in: Max Ernst, Die Retrospektive, Nationalgalerie Berlin 1999, Haus der Kunst, Munich 1999
- Kunstgeschichten: von Bildern und Künstlern im 20. Jahrhundert, Cologne 1998 ISBN 3-7701-4703-0
- Modes d'emploi, Paris 1998
- Un musée du XXIe siècle. XXe/MNAM/COLLECTIONS – Une histoire matérielle, Centre Pompidou 2000
- Picasso-sculpteur, Centre Georges Pompidou, Paris 2000
- La Révolution surréaliste, Centre Georges Pompidou, Paris 2002
- Picasso beim Stierkampf, Cologne 2002
- Surrealismus, Kanon einer Bewegung, Cologne 2003
- Anselm Kiefer, Künzelsau 2004
- Marcel Duchamp starb in seinem Badezimmer an einem Lachanfall. Portraits (Edition Akzente), ed. Michael Krüger), Munich and Vienna 2005, ISBN 3-446-20581-0
- Max Ernst: Leben und Werk, Cologne 2005
- Max Ernst: Life and Work: An Autobiographical Collage, London 2006
- Picasso – Malen gegen die Zeit. Ostfildern 2006, ISBN 978-3-7757-1831-8
- (together with C. Sylvia Weber), Liebe auf den ersten Blick. Hundert Neuerwerbungen der Sammlung Würth. Museum Würth, Künzelsau 2007, ISBN 978-3-89929-111-7
- Max Ernst • Bilder und Skulpturen in der Sammlung Würth, Künzelsau 2008, ISBN 978-3-89929-132-2
- Max Ernst in der Sammlung Würth • Grafik und Bücher, Künzelsau 2008, ISBN 978-3-89929-131-5 (new edition)
- Auge und Wort. volume 1 – 10. Gesammelte Schriften zu Kunst und Literatur, University Press, Berlin 2008, ISBN 978-3-940432-32-2
- (together with C. Sylvia Weber), ed., Im Blick des Sammlers. Neuerwerbungen der Sammlung Würth von Kirchner und Schlemmer bis Kiefer, Künzelsau 2009, ISBN 978-3-89929-149-0
- Der ikonografische Imperativ der Deutschen: von George Grosz zu Anselm Kiefer, University Press, Berlin, 2009. ISBN 978-3-940432-53-7
- Paths to the Twentieth Century: The Eye and the Word: Collected Writings on Art and Literature. New York: Harry N. Abrams, 2011.
- Mein Glück. Erinnerungen. Munich: Hanser Verlag, 2012.
- Archiv der Träume. Meisterwerke aus dem Musée d'Orsay. Munich: Sieveking Verlag, 2015.

== Awards ==
- 1979 Johann-Heinrich-Merck-Preis of the Deutsche Akademie für Sprache und Dichtung
- 1995 Wilhelm Hausenstein-Ehrung of the Bayerische Akademie der Schönen Künste
- 2001 Goethe Medal
- 2003 Elsie-Kühn-Leitz-Preis of the Deutsch-französische Gesellschaft
- Premio internazionale arte et letterature Sergio Polillo, Bergamo
- 2003 Preis der Art Cologne
- Croix de Commandeur de l'Ordre des Arts et des Lettres
- Croix de Commandeur de l'Ordre national du Mérite
- Großes Bundesverdienstkreuz mit Stern
- Verdienstorden des Landes Nordrhein-Westfalen
- Verdienstmedaille des Landes Baden-Württemberg
