= Pinacothèque de Paris =

Coordinates: 48°52′14.5″N 2°19′32.7″E

- Pinacothèque de Paris
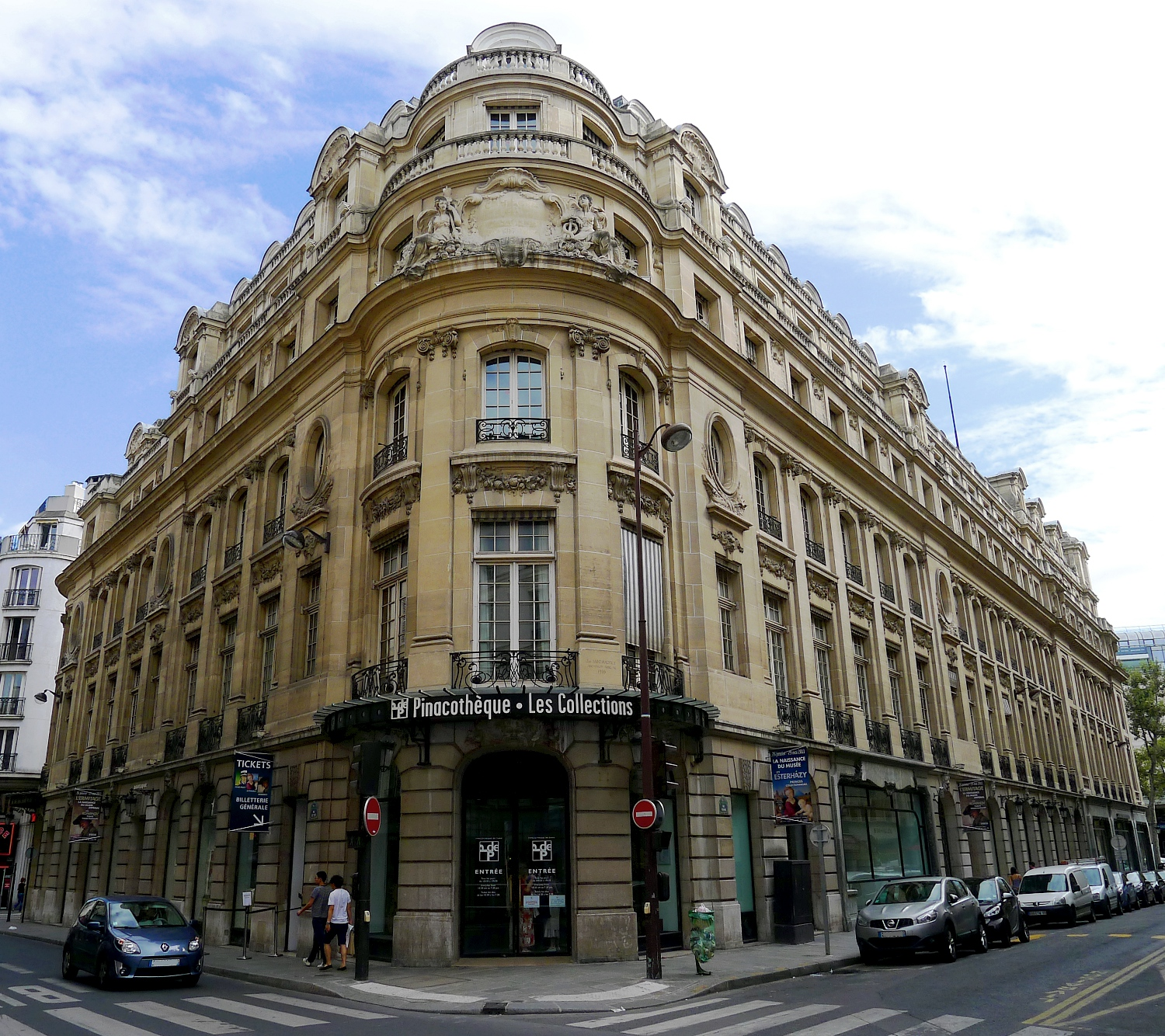
- Pinacothèque de Paris

- Location within Paris
- Established: 15 June 2007
- Dissolved: 15 February 2016
- Location: Paris, France
- Type: art museum
- Founder: Marc Restellini
- Architect: Lawrence Guinamard-Casati
- Owner: Credit Agricole
- Website: www.pinacotheque.com

The Pinacothèque de Paris (French: [pinakɔtɛk də paʁi]) was an art gallery in Paris, France, with exhibition space for temporary exhibitions of artworks. It was owned and run by Modigliani enthusiast Marc Restellini. It closed on 15 February 2016 after going into receivership in November 2015.

== Background ==
The art gallery opened on 15 June 2007 at 28, Place de la Madeleine in the 8th arrondissement of Paris, France. It was previously at 30, Rue de Paradis in the 10th arrondissement, where an exhibition of works by Picasso was held in Autumn 2003. The gallery is funded from private sources and organizes exhibitions. There is no permanent collection of artworks.

The museum was described as "amateur" because the exhibited works were not displayed following official systems of classification.

The architect of the building was Lawrence Guinamard-Casati. It was owned by Credit Agricole and includes about 2,000 square metres (22,000 sq ft) on three levels: a basement, a ground floor, and first floor.

The museum closed in February 2016, citing drops in visits, mostly since the November 2015 Paris attacks, the same month the museum filed for bankruptcy. Restellini also complained that private museums face the unfair competition of the numerous public-funded museums. The museum closed in the middle of the Karl Lagerfeld, a Visual Journey exhibition. Its Singapore branch (managed through Art Heritage Singapore) also closed down, in April of the same year. After it closed down, it was revealed that Marc Restellini may have used the Pinacothèque with the art dealer Yves Bouvier to sell the exhibited works. The Pinacothèque was a subsidiary of companies in Belgium and the Netherlands, so its owners remained anonymous. Starting in 2015, the museum stopped paying its providers. The museum closed with $10 million in due payments. The French authorities opened an investigation for fiscal fraud and embezzlement. The US real estate investor Hines Interests Limited Partnership bought the museum's building on Place de la Madeleine in July 2017.

== Exhibitions ==
2003

- Picasso Intime (November 7, 2003 – March 28, 2004)

2007

- Roy Lichtenstein: Evolution (June 15 – September 23)
- Chaïm Soutine: le fou Smilovitchi (October 10, 2007 – January 27, 2008)

2008

- Workshop Man Ray (March 5, 2008 – June 2, 2008)
- Soldiers of Eternity, 20 statues of the Terracotta Army (June 15, 2008 – September 14, 2008)
- Jackson Pollock and Shamanism (October 15, 2008 – February 15, 2009)
- Georges Rouault (September 17, 2008 to January 18, 2009)

2009

- Suzanne Valadon – Maurice Utrillo (March 12, 2009 – September 15, 2009)
- Carte Blanche Hervé di Rosa (June 19, 2009 – September 2009)
- The Dutch Golden Age (October 7, 2009 – February 7, 2010)

2010

- Edvard Munch or the "Anti-Scream" (February 19, 2010 – July 18, 2010)
- The Inca's Gold: Origins and Mysteries(September 10, 2010 – February 6, 2011)

2011

- Romanovs, Tsars and Art Collectors (January 26 – May 29, 2011)
- Esterházys, Princes and Art Collectors (January 26 – May 29, 2011)
- Hugo Pratt's imaginary Journey (March 17 – August 21, 2011)
- Giacometti and the Etruscans (September 16, 2011 – January 8, 2012)

2012

- The Mayan Jade Masks (January 26 – June 10, 2012)
- The Netter Collection: Modigliani, Soutine and the Montparnasse Adventure (April 4 – September 9, 2012)
- Van Gogh: Dreams of Japan / Hiroshige, the Art of Travel (October 3, 2012 – March 17, 2013)

2013

- Art Nouveau: the Decorative Revolution (April 18 – September 8, 2013)
- Tamara de Lempicka: the Queen of Art Deco (April 18 – September 8, 2013)
- Goya and Modernity (October 11, 2013 – March 16, 2014)
- Brueghel's Dynasty (October 11, 2013 – March 16, 2014)
- Chu Teh-Chun, Ways to Abstraction (October 11, 2013 – March 16, 2014)

2014

- The Myth of Cleopatra (April 10 – September 7, 2014)
- Kâma-Sûtra: Spirituality and Eroticism in Indian Art (October 2, 2014 – January 11, 2015)
- The Art of Love in the Time of Geishas (November 6, 2014 – February 15, 2015)

2015

- In the Time of Klimt, the Vienna Secession (February 12 – June 21, 2015)
- Pressionism: The Masterpieces of Graffiti on Canvas, from Basquiat to Bando - 1970-1990 (March 12 – October 10, 2015)
- From Rubens to Van Dyck, Flemish masterpieces of the Gerstenmaier Collection (July 10 – October 19, 2015)
- Karl Lagerfeld, A Visual Journey, photographs (October 15, 2015 – February 15, 2016)
- Leonardo da Vinci, Il Genio - The Secrets of the Codex Atlanticus unveiled (October 30, 2015 – January 31, 2016)

== Singapore project ==
In 2013, the Singapore government announced the opening of Singapore Pinacothèque de Paris, a dependence of the museum that would bring Old Masters and Modern art exhibitions to the city. The new museum was planned to be located in a “pop-up” space, during renovations to its eventual home, the historic Fort Canning building in the arts district. The museum opened in May 2015 and closed in April the next year, citing "weaker than expected visitorship and other business and financial challenges".

== See also ==
- Pinacotheca
