= Singapore Pinacothèque de Paris =

Coordinates: 1°17′43″N 103°50′48″E

- Singapore Pinacothèque de Paris
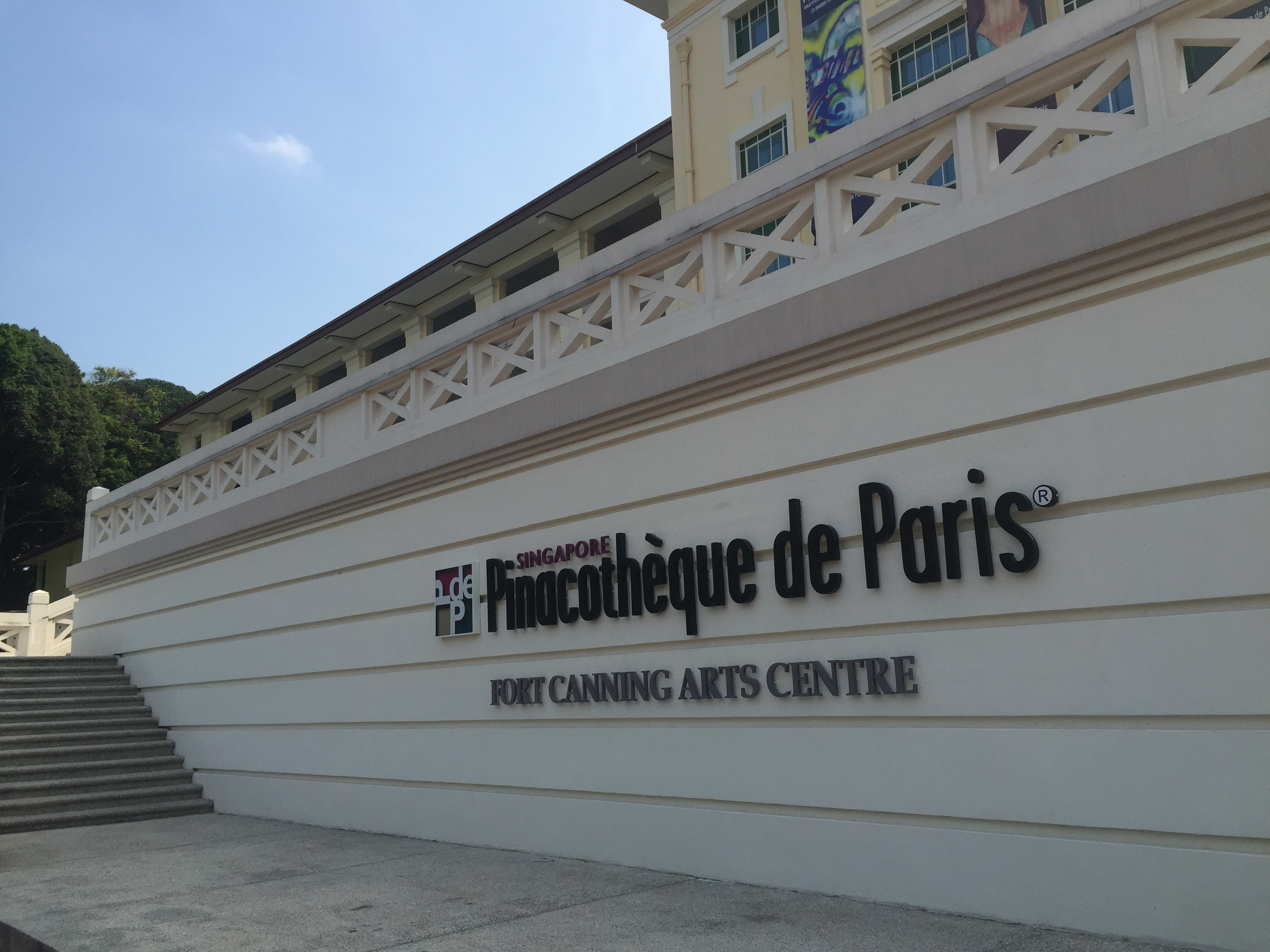
- Singapore Pinacothèque de Paris at the Fort Canning Arts Centre

- Location within Singapore
- Established: 29 May 2015
- Dissolved: 11 April 2016
- Location: Fort Canning Arts Centre, Singapore
- Type: art museum
- Founder: Marc Restellini
- Director: Marc Restellini
- CEO: Kirk Ho (deputy); Suguna Madhaven (former)
- Chairperson: Marc Restellini
- Curator: Marc Restellini
- Historian: Marc Restellini
- Parking: Percival Road Car Park B
- Website: www.pinacotheque.com.sg

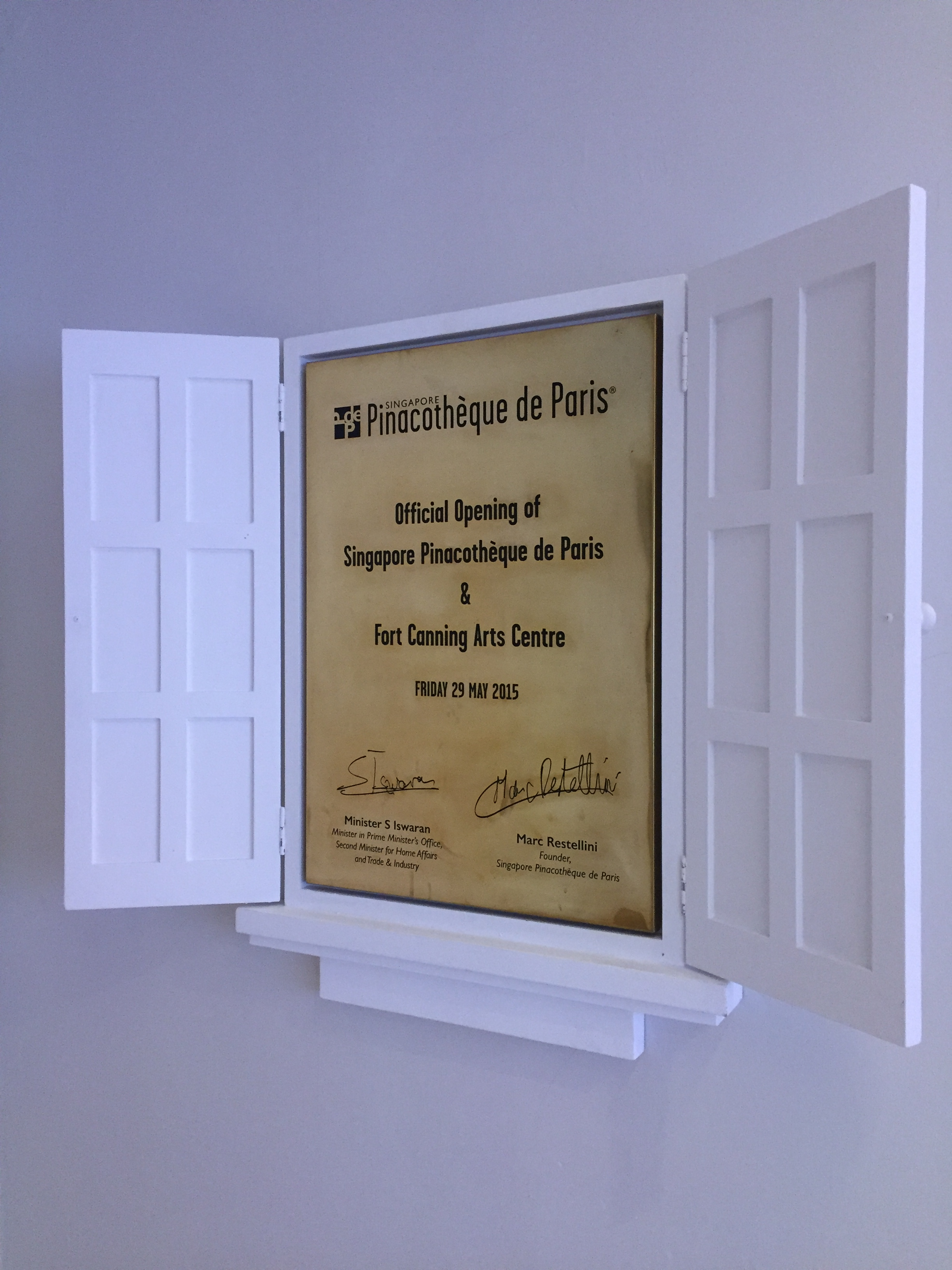
A plaque commemorating the official opening of the art museum on 29 May 2015

Singapore Pinacothèque de Paris was a private art museum formerly located in the Fort Canning Arts Centre at Fort Canning Park, Singapore. It opened to the public on 30 May 2015 and had its last day of operations on 10 April 2016, citing "weaker than expected visitorship and other business and financial challenges faced".

The museum in Singapore was the first international offshoot of Pinacothèque de Paris, a private museum in Paris which opened in 2007 and closed in February 2016 after going into receivership in November 2015.

== Background ==
Singapore Pinacothèque de Paris, which had its official opening on 29 May 2015 and opened to the public the next day, covered about 5,500 square metres (59,000 ft^{2}) over three floors of Fort Canning Centre, a historic building at Fort Canning Hill built in 1926 for use as barracks by the British Army. The project was a joint initiative between Marc Restellini, Yves Bouvier, Alain Vandenborre and KOP Properties.

== Renovation of Fort Canning Centre ==
From 2014 to 2015, Fort Canning Centre was completely renovated and reopened as Fort Canning Arts Centre to host Singapore Pinacothèque de Paris and several shops and restaurants, some of which remain in operation after the closure of the museum. The project was partially funded by the Singapore Tourism Board and had a budget of US$24 million.

== Exhibitions ==
2015

- Inauguration of the Permanent Collection and Heritage Gallery.
- The Myth of Cleopatra.

2016

- Pressionism: Graffiti Masterpieces on Canvas.

== Controversies and closure ==
The museum was subject to some controversy because of its lack of visitors, which had placed a number of the commercial tenants of Fort Canning Centre in financial difficulties. In addition, one of the investors in the project, Yves Bouvier, has been accused by a Russian collector of selling to him artworks which were stolen or greatly overpriced, claims which Bouvier denies.

The museum closed on 10 April 2016. The company which managed the museum, Art Heritage Singapore, faced a lawsuit in Singapore initiated by an Italian exhibition organiser over a sum of about €435,000 as the closure occurred.
