= 12 Tangos =

2005 film

- Directed by: Arne Birkenstock
- Written by: Arne Birkenstock
- Produced by: Arne Birkenstock; Thomas Springer; Helmut G. Weber
- Cinematography: Volker Noack; Sergio Gazzera; Toni Hervida
- Edited by: Felix Bach
- Music by: Luis Borda
- Production companies: Fruitmarket Kultur und Medien; Tradewind Pictures
- Release date: 8 December 2005
- Running time: 86 minutes
- Country: Germany
- Language: Spanish

12 Tangos: Adios Buenos Aires is a German documentary film from director and producer Arne Birkenstock. It was filmed in 2004 in Buenos Aires. The music was arranged and composed by the guitarist and composer Luis Borda. The movie was produced by Cologne production companies Fruitmarket Kultur und Medien and Tradewind Pictures in collobaration with ZDF and Arte. Script development was aided by the European Media-Program. The movie was released by Kinostar GmbH and sold worldwide by Medialuna Entertainment. Co-producers Peter Bach and Hans Georg Haakshorst supported its production.

== Synopsis ==
The documentary tells the story of several tango dancers in crisis-ridden Buenos Aires. In the "Catedral", a 200 years old granary in Buenos Aires, an orchestra plays 12 well known tangos, while the weekly ball guests move in circles. Professional dancer Roberto Tonet (age 71) and 20-year-old dancer Marcela are featured. Tonet lost his pension during the banking crisis and Marcela is preparing to emigrate to Europe. Around them are other dancers whose dancing and daily lives are explored. Rodrigo and Fabiana are two schoolchildren who live in the poor neighborhood Nueva Pompeya. Rodrigo is the son of Bolivian immigrants, Fabiana lives alone with her three siblings since her mother left to work as a cleaning lady in Spain, in order to earn enough money to pay rent. The movie shows the farewell of the mother and her four children. The five members of the trash rock band "Las Muñecas" take to the stage in the hippest Tango club of the city. They live in the "Catedral", organize tango balls and interpret Carlos Gardel 's songs on their e-guitars.

Tango is the expression of crisis and lost hope and their connection is reflected in the history of these dancers who lost wealth, jobs and salaries due to the current situation. In 12 Tangos their story and that of their ancestors is told.

== Music ==
Composer and guitarist Luis Borda formed Argentinean musicians into an orchestra representing several generations: 92-year-old Maria de la Fuente sang with Lidia Borda. Also singing are Gabriel Menendez, Jorge Sobral and Eduardo Borda. The movie shows the final recordings with bandoneon legend José Libertella, who died shortly after the movie was completed. The bandoneon is also played by Julio Pane and Pablo Mainetti. The violin is played by concertmaster of the Teatro Colon Mauricio Marcelli, supported by Huberto Ridolfi and Elisabet Ridolfi. The orchestra is completed by pianist Diego Shissi, bassist Oscar Giunta, trompetist Juan Cruz de Urquiza, Pablo La Porta (percussion), Marcos Cabezas (vibraphone), Diego Pojomowsky (e-bass) and the saxophone-quartet De Coté. The orchestra's repertoire includes classics such as "Adiós Nonino", "Sur", "La Cachila", "La Puñalada" and "Milonga de mis amores" and lesser-known treasures such as "Pampero", "En carne propia" or the waltz "El Paisaje, and new compositions such as "Ironía del Salón" and "Corralito".
