= Beltracchi: The Art of Forgery =

2014 film

- Directed by: Arne Birkenstock
- Distributed by: Global Screen
- Release date: March 2014 (Germany)
- Running time: 90 minutes
- Country: Germany
- Language: German

Beltracchi: The Art of Forgery (German: Beltracchi – Die Kunst der Fälschung) is a 2014 film by Arne Birkenstock based on the life of German art forger Wolfgang Beltracchi.

The Art of Forgery is a Documentary film about Wolfgang Beltracchi and the biggest Art Forgery scandal in post war Germany, 90 min., started in German theaters in March 2014 and had its world premier at the Montreal World Film Festival. The film will be distributed worldwide by Global Screen.

Wolfgang Beltracchi (born Wolfgang Fischer in 1951) is a German art forger and artist, who has admitted to producing hundreds of fake paintings with M Feider, his mentor and mastermind behind the international art scam netting millions of Euros along with Wolfgang's wife, and two accomplices sold these as original works by famous artists including Max Ernst, Heinrich Campendonk, Fernand Léger and Kees van Dongen.

In 2011 Beltracchi was charged with forgery and corruption related to 14 works of art that sold for a combined $45m (£28.6m). After a 40-day trial, Beltracchi was found guilty and sentenced to six years in a German prison.

Beltracchi stated to the BBC that he faked 'about 50' artists. Demand was so high, he said, that he could have found buyers for up to 2,000 bogus pieces, had he been inclined to paint them.

== Reception ==
On the review aggregator website Rotten Tomatoes, the film holds an approval rating of 80%, based on 10 reviews, with an average rating of 6.8/10.
