= Arne Birkenstock =

German film director and screenwriter (1967–2025)

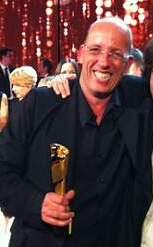
Birkenstock in 2011

Arne Birkenstock (7 December 1967 – 28 November 2025) was a German film director and screenwriter.

== Life and career ==
Birkenstock was born in Huettental and raised in Cologne. He studied economy, political science, history of Latin America and romance languages in Cologne, Buenos Aires and Córdoba, and received a master's degree in Latin American Studies.

He published several studies and non-fiction books on Latin American music and on arts and media policy for German publishing houses and governmental institutions. He wrote, directed and produced several feature-length documentary films. In 2011 and 2014, he was awarded the German Film Academy Award LOLA. His documentary feature "Beltracchi – The Art of Forgery" had its US theatrical release in August 2015 at Film Forum in New York City and Laemmle Theatres in Los Angeles, distributed by Kimstim. As a producer, Birkenstock worked with directors like David Bernet (Democracy), Viviane Blumenschein (Midsummer Nights Tango), Uli Gaulke (Comrades in Dream), Florian Opitz (The Big Sellout) Enrique Sánchez Lansch (Rhythm Is It!), Tonje Hessen Schei (Drone), Milo Rau (The Congo Tribunal), Yasemin and Nesrin Samdereli (Almanya: Welcome to Germany).

Birkenstock was a board member of the Deutsche Filmakademie. He was also a member of the European Film Academy, and the German Documentary Association (AG DOK). Birkenstock served as a jury member for film funds in Germany and Switzerland.

Birkenstock died after a long illness on 28 November 2025, at the age of 57.

== Filmography ==
- 12 Tangos – Adios Buenos Aires – Cinema documentary on several dancers who emigrate from Buenos Aires. The film features an All Star Tango Orchestra with some of the most famous Argentinian musicians such as Juan José "Pepe" Libertella, Lidia Borda and others. 86 min., 2005. It was shown in German theatres and broadcast in ARTE and other TV channels worldwide.
- Chandani: The Daughter of the Elephant Whisperer – Cinema documentary about a young girl who wants to become a Mahout in Sri Lanka 90 min., 2010
- Sound of Heimat – Cinema documentary about Folk music from Germany. 90 min., had its theatrical release in September 2012
- The Art of Forgery is a documentary film about Wolfgang Beltracchi and the biggest Art Forgery scandal in post war Germany, 90 min., started in German theaters in March 2014 and had its world premiere at the Montreal World Film Festival. The film will be distributed worldwide by Global Screen.
- The Moscow Trials. Cinema documentary and theatre event by Milo Rau, who assembled the protagonists of the trials about Pussy Riot and two art exhibits in a staged court house in Moscow in March 2013.
- "The Night of the Nights" – Cinema documentary of Yasemin Şamdereli and Nesrin Şamdereli about four couples in Germany, Turkey, Argentina and the US who have been married for 60 and more years and had a "real" wedding night.
- 7000 KM from Home – TV documentary series about German foreign exchange students in China, 4 x 30 min., 2008

== Awards ==
The theatrical documentary Chandani – The daughter of the elephant whisperer was awarded the German Film Award as best Children's Feature and as Best Documentary at the Chicago International Children's Film Festival.

The documentary "Beltracchi – The Art of Forgery" was awarded in 2014 the German Film Award "Lola" as "best documentary".

The documentary "The Congo Tribunal" was awarded in 2018 the Zurich Film Award and nominated for the Swiss Film Award and for German Film Award "Lola" as "best documentary".

The documentary "The Night of All Nights" was awarded in 2018 at the Bavarian Film Awards as "best Documentary".
