= Bouvier Affair =

International art fraud scandal

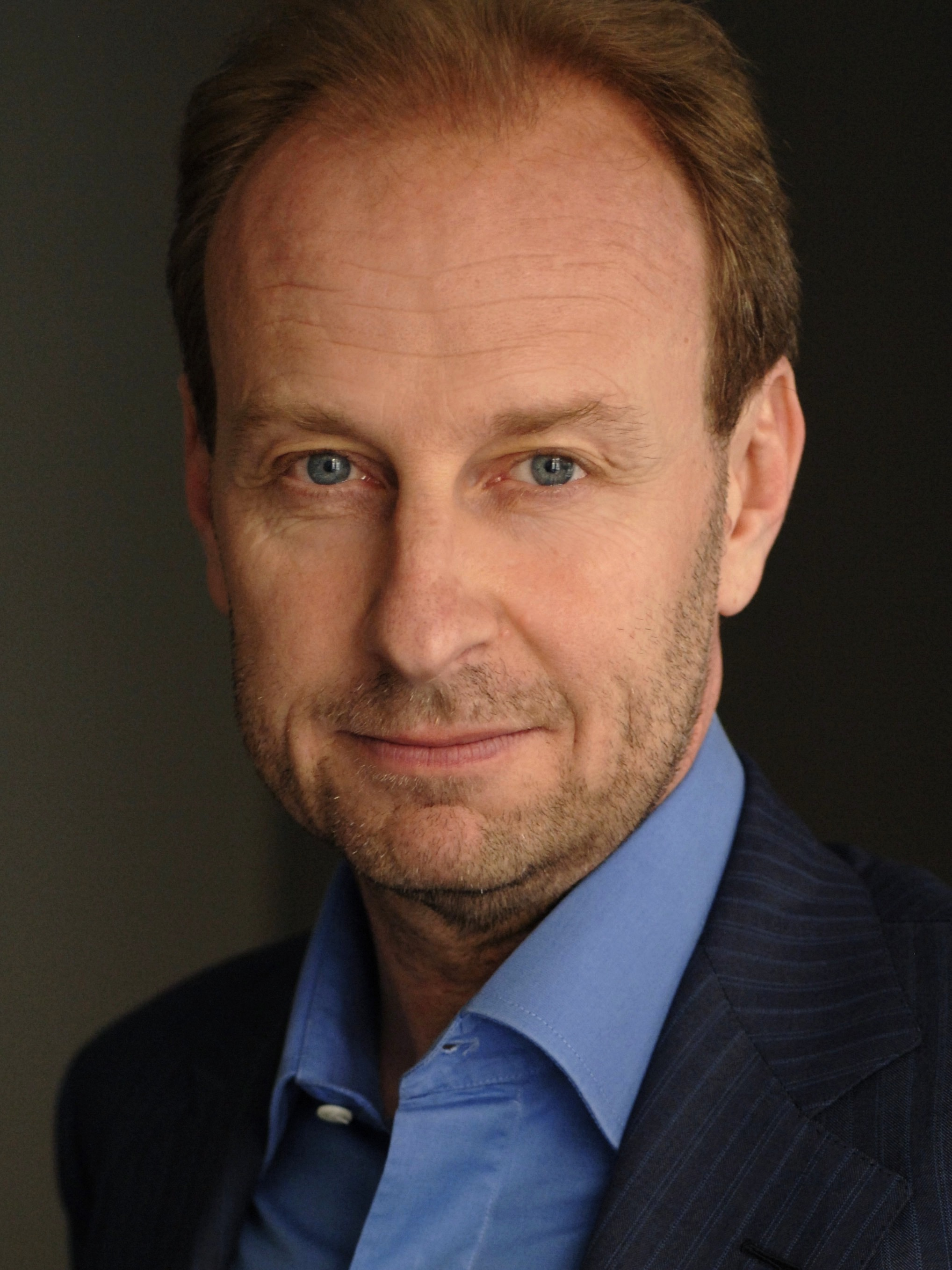
Yves Bouvier

The Bouvier Affair was a high-profile legal and financial dispute that unfolded between 2015 and 2024, involving Russian billionaire Dmitry Rybolovlev and Swiss art dealer Yves Bouvier. Rybolovlev accused Bouvier of fraud, alleging that he had significantly inflated the prices of 38 artworks, including masterpieces by Pablo Picasso, Leonardo da Vinci, and Mark Rothko.

The affair has played out in courts in Monaco, Switzerland, France, the United States, Hong Kong and Singapore.

Over time, many of the cases against Bouvier were dismissed, and investigations were closed. In December 2023, both parties reached an agreement and set aside all their remaining legal disputes in all jurisdictions.

The case exposed opaque practices in the art world and sparked discussions about the need for regulation in the industry.

== Background ==
=== Prior fraud allegations ===
Before 2015, Bouvier was primarily known in the market as a leading art dealer and curator through his company, Natural Le Coultre, and as a major shareholder and promoter of the freeport concept.

==== Lorette Shefner ====
In 2008, Bouvier became embroiled in a legal case involving Lorette Shefner, a Canadian collector. Shefner's family claims that she was the victim of a complex fraud, whereby she was persuaded to sell a Soutine painting called Le Bœuf écorché at a price far below market value, only to see the work later sold to the National Gallery of Art in Washington, D.C. for a much higher price. Although Bouvier is not the primary defendant, court documents from 2013 accuse him of having acted "in concert" with several experts "to disguise the true ownership" of pieces of art in order to defraud the Shefner estate.

==== Wolfgang Beltracchi forgery scandal ====
In 2013, Yves Bouvier's name surfaced in connection with the art forgery scandal involving Wolfgang Beltracchi, one of the largest art fraud cases in modern history. Beltracchi, a German forger, created fake artworks attributed to well-known artists, which were then sold as lost masterpieces. These forgeries misled collectors and institutions around the world, including figures like Daniel Filipacchi, resulting in significant financial losses.

Diva Fine Arts, a company owned by Bouvier, owned and brokered several paintings that were later identified as forgeries. According to German newspaper Die Zeit, Bouvier founded Galerie Jacques de la Béraudière in 2008 together with art dealer Jacques de la Béraudière, involved in the sale of Beltracchi’s forged artworks. He denied any connection to Beltracchi and dismissed media coverage as uninformed speculation.

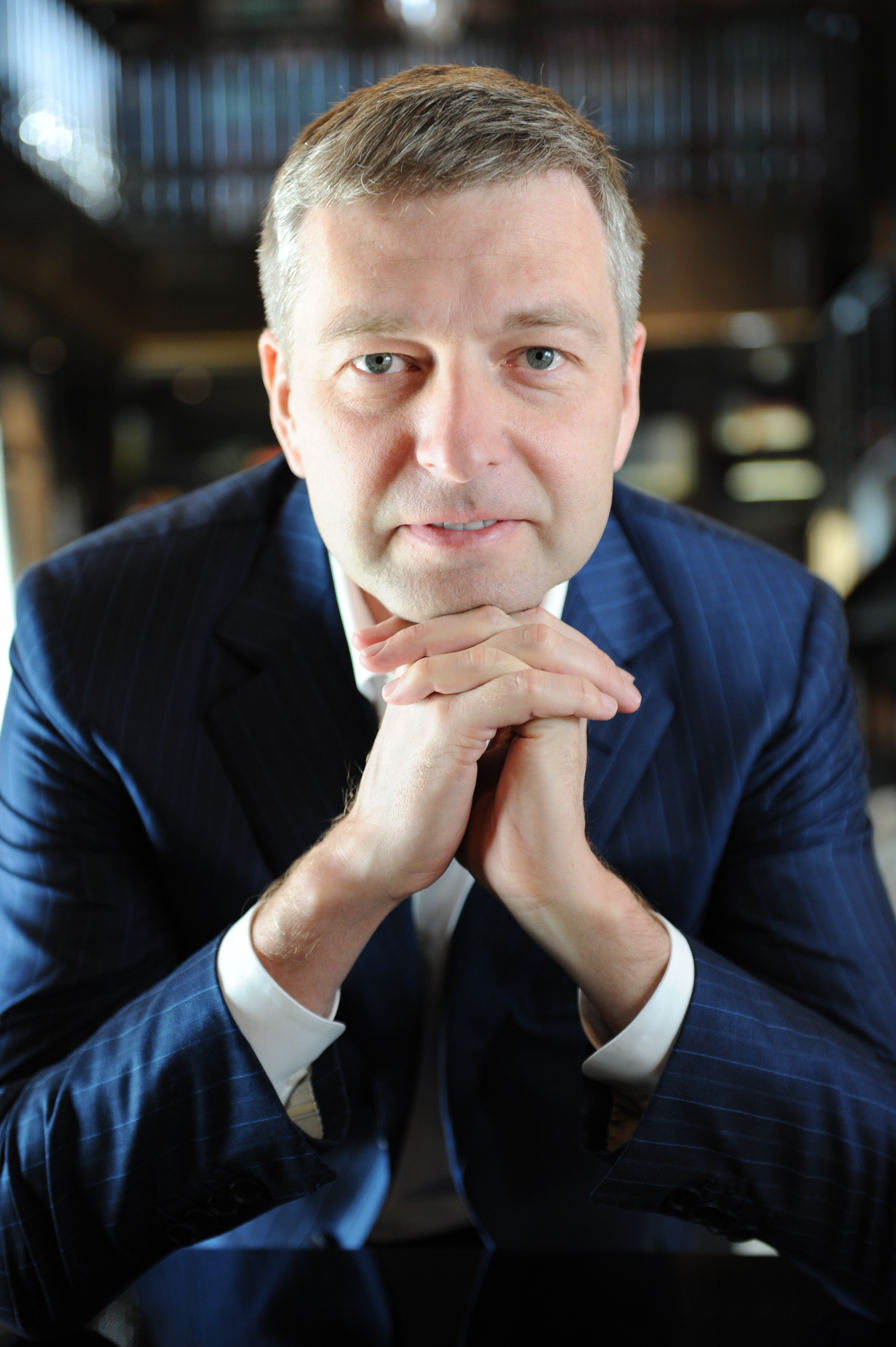
Dmitry Rybolovlev

==== Catherine Hutin-Blay ====
In March 2015, Catherine Hutin-Blay, the step daughter of Pablo Picasso from his second wife Jacqueline, filed a complaint in Paris alleging that 58 separate works had been stolen from her. Hutin-Blay alleged that the works were stolen from a store in a suburb of Paris that is run by Art Transit, a Bouvier family company. It later emerged that Bouvier had sold two of the allegedly stolen Picasso paintings to Rybolovlev in 2013. Bouvier maintained that he had legally paid $8 million for the artworks through the Nobilo Trust, an offshore entity based in Liechtenstein. Rybolovlev handed over the paintings to French authorities in 2015.

Bouvier denied any involvement in the thefts, but in September 2015 he was indicted by French authorities on charges of theft in relation to the discovery of two of the works by Picasso that Hutin-Blay alleged were stolen from her. Hutin-Blay claimed that the artworks in question originally came from Picasso's last studio in Mougins. After inheriting the property, she had the contents catalogued and stored by an art broker, Olivier Thomas. Hutin-Blay asserted that she was unaware of the thefts until years later, when she visited the storage facility and found pieces missing. In court, Bouvier produced a document showing that he paid $8 million to a fund in Liechtenstein, of which Hutin-Blay was the beneficiary, and asserted that this was for the two paintings. Hutin-Blay disputed this, arguing that the payment concerned a matter unrelated to the thefts.

In 2016, the French press reported that Catherine Hutin-Blay stored 79 Picasso artworks, valued at €35 million, in the Geneva freeports, transported by a company owned by Yves Bouvier. This raised questions about her earlier claims that she was not acquainted with him. Subsequent investigations revealed that Hutin-Blay had sold some of these artworks, and the proceeds were routed through the Nobilo Trust, where she admitted to being a beneficiary, though she denied owning the account.

During the investigation, indications emerged that Rybolovlev’s legal team may have attempted to use Hutin-Blay’s claims as part of their broader case against Bouvier. Also mentioned in the court papers was another business partner of Bouvier, Jean-Marc Peretti, who did not face any charges in this case. Peretti, who was Bouvier’s key negotiator in sensitive art deals, is also known as a member of a Corsican criminal group “Petit Bar” currently under investigation by French authorities for money laundering.

In 2017, the Paris court closed the theft case against Bouvier.

In November 2024, a French court ruled that Bouvier must stand trial over allegations concerning stolen Picasso artworks. This decision followed the emergence of new evidence, including digital records and email exchanges that implicated Bouvier in the unauthorized sale of over 60 Picasso pieces from the collection of Catherine Hutin-Blay. The evidence showed irregularities in the ownership documentation and suggested that Bouvier had orchestrated the secret sale of these artworks. Investigators pointed to discrepancies in valuations and hidden details about the provenance, implying that Bouvier may have deliberately inflated prices while concealing the artworks' origins.

In January 2026, an investigating judge ruled that Yves Bouvier should stand trial before a criminal court in Paris on charges including handling stolen goods and money laundering. The decision followed the assessment that no verifiable documentation had been provided to support the lawful acquisition of the artworks in question. His associate Olivier Thomas was also referred to trial on related charges, including breach of trust. Bouvier has denied the allegations.

=== Allegations of money laundering ===
In late 2015, it emerged that Bouvier has been investigated by the authorities in Liechtenstein on suspicion of money laundering, in one instance related to a forged Max Ernst work that is alleged to have been created by Wolfgang Beltracchi. However, Liechtenstein suspended its investigation in December 2015.

In September 2017, Bouvier was under criminal investigation by Swiss authorities amid allegations that he may have evaded more than 100 million Euros in taxes related to his cross-border art dealings. In 2024 he was ordered by a Swiss federal court to pay 730 million swiss francs ($821 million) in unpaid taxes to the canton of Geneva for the years 2008 to 2015. The ruling found that Bouvier, despite claiming fiscal residence in Singapore, where he moved to 2009, spent most of the time in Geneva during the period in question.

== Case ==
Beginning in 2003, with the help of Yves Bouvier, Dmitry Rybolovlev accumulated one of the most notable art collections of modern times. Rybolovlev's art collection includes paintings by Paul Gauguin, Auguste Rodin, Amedeo Modigliani, Pablo Picasso, Henri Matisse, Mark Rothko and Gustav Klimt.

=== Background ===
Yves Bouvier met Rybolovlev for the first time in 2003, when he came to see him for the occasion of the delivery of the Marc Chagall painting, Le Cirque. Tania Rappo, a friend of the Rybolovlev family, organized the purchase of Marc Chagall's Le Cirque painting for $6 million. When the painting arrived at the premises of Natural Le Coultre, located in the Geneva freeport, the canvas did not have a certificate of authenticity guaranteeing that the artwork was an original. Rybolovlev feared he had been scammed, but Bouvier acquired the certificate a few days later and requested Rappo to organize a meeting with the Rybolovlev at their home in Cologny. Rybolovlev did not know then that the Finatrading company, which had sold him the Chagall, was in fact the property of Yves Bouvier. Bouvier promised Rappo that he would give her a commission for every work sold to Rybolovlev, for introducing him to the billionaire. Bouvier subsequently acquired a total of 38 artworks between 2003 and 2014 for Rybolovlev, including Vincent van Gogh, Pablo Picasso and Amedeo Modigliani.

As reported in media, the Russian learned of the alleged fraud from Sandy Heller, an art adviser who had sold Modigliani's Nude on a blue cushion for $93.5 million to Bouvier, who then sold it to Rybolovlev for $118 million. This prompted Rybolovlev to file for fraud and money laundering in Monaco.

=== Monaco ===
On 25 February 2015, Bouvier was indicted in Monaco on charges of fraud and complicity in money laundering. The charges followed a criminal complaint made by Rybolovlev's family trust alleging that Bouvier had systematically overcharged it over a period of 10 years to acquire paintings. Specifically, the Russian billionaire's lawyers accused Bouvier of having misrepresented his role in obtaining 38 artworks for $2 billion and having thus defrauded Rybolovlev to the tune of a little more than $1 billion, using offshore companies to disguise his gains. The arrest took place shortly after Bouvier arrived in the principality, where he was scheduled to meet Rybolovlev. Bouvier was released on a €10 million bail.

Bouvier has denied the claims stating that he presented himself as the seller of the artwork, rather than an adviser, and that Rybolovlev was aware of the extra markup he earned on top of the fees.

As a part of the case, Rybolovlev's lawyer Tetiana Bersheda recorded a private conversation with Tania Rappo at the oligarch's house a few days before the arrest of Bouvier to prove her involvement in the alleged fraud. Following a complaint filed by Tania Rappo, Rybolovlev and Bersheda were briefly placed in police custody on 17 November 2015. On 23 February 2016, Bersheda was also charged by Monaco court for violation of the privacy of Rappo. Bersheda maintained that the recording concerned a professional conversation and was therefore authorized by Monegasque law.

During the investigation in Monaco, Berscheda handed over her phone so that the judge could verify the authenticity of records that were part of the proceedings. However, the judge accessed all the information stored on the lawyer’s smartphone.

In September 2017, following an article published by Le Monde, based on extracts from the phone of Bersheda, Monaco's Director of Judicial Services (effectively the Minister of Justice), Philippe Narmino, was forced to resign. The article claimed that Narmino had received gifts from Rybolovlev and had stayed multiple times at the billionaire’s Swiss residence. He announced his resignation just hours after the article was published.

In November 2018, Dmitry Rybolovlev was briefly detained for questioning by Monaco authorities as part of a broader investigation into potential corruption within the principality's judicial system. At the same time, a search was conducted in his Belle Époque penthouse. Rybolovlev’s lawyer, Tetiana Bersheda, along with several former law enforcement officials, were also temporarily held for questioning.

Following interrogations, all individuals involved, including Narmino’s wife and son, were released on November 7 under judicial supervision. The case led to formal charges by the investigating judge, Edouard Levrault, against several senior figures in Monaco, including former Interior Minister Paul Masseron and three high-ranking police officers, on allegations of bribery and influence peddling.

On that basis, Bouvier and Rappo attempted to have the charges against them thrown out, arguing that there were a number of irregularities in the legal procedure against them and that Rybolovlev may have exercised undue influence. In 2016, a Monegasque judge rejected their argument. In 2019, the Monaco Court of Appeals dismissed the charges against Bouvier.

Rybolovlev and his lawyer contested this use of the device, claiming it constituted a breach of attorney-client privilege.

In 2019, Monaco’s Court of Appeal dismissed the charges against Bouvier, citing violations of due process and evidence of undue influence. In July 2019, Rybolovlev and Bersheda appealed to the European Court of Human Rights claiming that the investigating judge in Monaco had exceeded his remit with regard to the invasion of privacy case. On 12 December 2019, Monaco’s Court of Appeal dismissed the charges of fraud and money laundering against Bouvier. Legal proceedings continue in other jurisdictions, including Switzerland. The Geneva public prosecutor's office is also in possession of emails exchanged between Bouvier and Sotheby's, while the former was making private purchases for Dmitry Rybolovlev.

In November 2023, it was reported that Monaco investigating judges dismissed the case against Rybolovlev concerning his alleged complicity for invasion of privacy. A complaint against Rybolovlev as well as his lawyer Tetiana Bersheda and then-Monaco public prosecutor Jean-Pierre Dreno was filed back in 2015 by Tatia Rappo, a friend of both Rybolovlev and Bouvier. The case against Dreno was also dismissed in November 2023, Bersheda was cleared of any wrongdoing related to the privacy charges by Monaco court in March 2024.

It was reported in the same month that Rybolovlev and Bouvier reached a non-disclosure settlement. According to a statement from the Geneva prosecutor's office, the parties requested not to initiate a criminal case.

In June 2024, the European Court of Human Rights ruled that the conduct of the criminal investigation against Bersheda "violated rights protected by the European Convention of Human Rights."

Following this ruling, in February 2025, the corruption and the influence-peddling case against Dmitry Rybolovlev was officially closed after Monaco’s judiciary ruled that the evidence presented was based on data unlawfully extracted from his lawyer's phone. This effectively concluded the legal proceedings that had been ongoing since 2015.

=== Switzerland ===
The legal proceedings against Yves Bouvier in Switzerland began in 2017 when Rybolovlev filed a criminal complaint in Geneva, accusing Bouvier and his accomplices, Tania Rappo and Jean-Marc Peretti of fraud, money laundering, and dishonest management related to the sale of 38 artworks valued at approximately €2.3 billion.

In 2017, Bouvier filed a counter-complaint against Rybolovlev in Switzerland, accusing the latter of allegedly luring him to Monaco to be detained by the Principality's police. In October 2024, the Swiss Federal Office of the Attorney General (OAG) declared Rybolovlev not guilty and closed the criminal proceedings against him as “no suspicion justifying an indictment has been established.”

A criminal investigation into Bouvier in Switzerland was closed in December 2023, with the Geneva Prosecutor's Office stating that it could not find any evidence to raise suspicion against him.

In December 2023, after nearly a decade of international legal battles, Yves Bouvier and Dmitry Rybolovlev reached a confidential global settlement.

In October 2024 legal proceedings initiated in 2017 by Bouvier against Dmitry Rybolovlev were also closed. The case stemmed from allegations that Rybolovlev had orchestrated the presence of a Swiss national in Monaco, where the individual was subsequently detained. However, the Swiss authorities concluded that the basis for opening the investigation - data extracted from the mobile phone of Rybolovlev’s lawyer, Tetiana Bersheda - had been obtained unlawfully. This conclusion aligned with a 2023 ruling by the European Court of Human Rights, which also found the data collection to be a violation of privacy. As a result, the case was dropped due to lack of admissible evidence.

=== Singapore ===
On 12 March 2015, Rybolovlev sued Bouvier in Singapore, asking for a global freeze on Bouvier's and Rappo's assets. On 13 March, Senior Judge Lai Siu Chiu of the High Court of Singapore ordered the global freezing of Bouvier's assets. The Singapore Court of Appeal repealed the decision and ordered that Bouvier's assets be unfrozen, citing a low risk that Bouvier would dissipate his assets and that Rybolovlev failed to follow procedure in the injunction by not giving Bouvier notice of the proceedings.

In March 2016, the High Court of Singapore dismissed Bouvier's attempt to suspend the civil suit filed in the territory against him by two companies linked to the Rybolovlev family trust. Bouvier had argued the dispute should be fought in the Swiss courts. In a judgment published on 22 March 2016, Senior Judge Lai Siu Chiu ruled that the Singapore suit, which was filed in the High Court in 2015, should proceed. She said the case should be transferred to the Singapore International Commercial Court, which deals specifically with cross-border commercial disputes.

On 18 April 2017, the Court of Appeal of Singapore again contradicted the High Court, ruling that Switzerland was a more appropriate forum for the civil lawsuit.

In 2022, Bouvier sold the Singapore freeport to a company of a Chinese crypto billionaire Jihan Wu for S$40 million (US$28.4 million).

=== Hong Kong ===
In addition to Singapore, Bouvier also had the assets of his Hong Kong-based company Mei Invest Limited frozen through an injunction in July 2015. In September that year, it was announced that a consent summons had been agreed upon between Bouvier and Accent Delight International Limited as well as Xitrans Finance Limited, two of Rybolovlev's companies. Subsequently, Bouvier's assets were unfrozen.

In 2025, Bouvier initiated proceedings in Hong Kong concerning 91 artworks worth an estimated $100 million that he said had been entrusted to art dealer Pascal de Sarthe and Jean-Marc Peretti during his legal dispute with Rybolovlev. According to Bouvier's filings, following the beginning of the Rybolovlev litigation in 2015, he was “blacklisted by auction houses” and entered into an oral agreement with de Sarthe and Peretti to take custody of and maintain the artworks including those by Marc Chagall, Pablo Picasso and Andy Warhol in order to preserve them. Bouvier subsequently sought information about the artworks' whereabouts, alleging that de Sarthe had failed to account for them. The Hong Kong proceedings include applications for injunctions, preservation of the artworks, and disclosure of information. De Sarthe disputed Bouvier's ownership, maintaining that the artworks had been consigned to him by Peretti and belonged to a third party.

=== United States ===
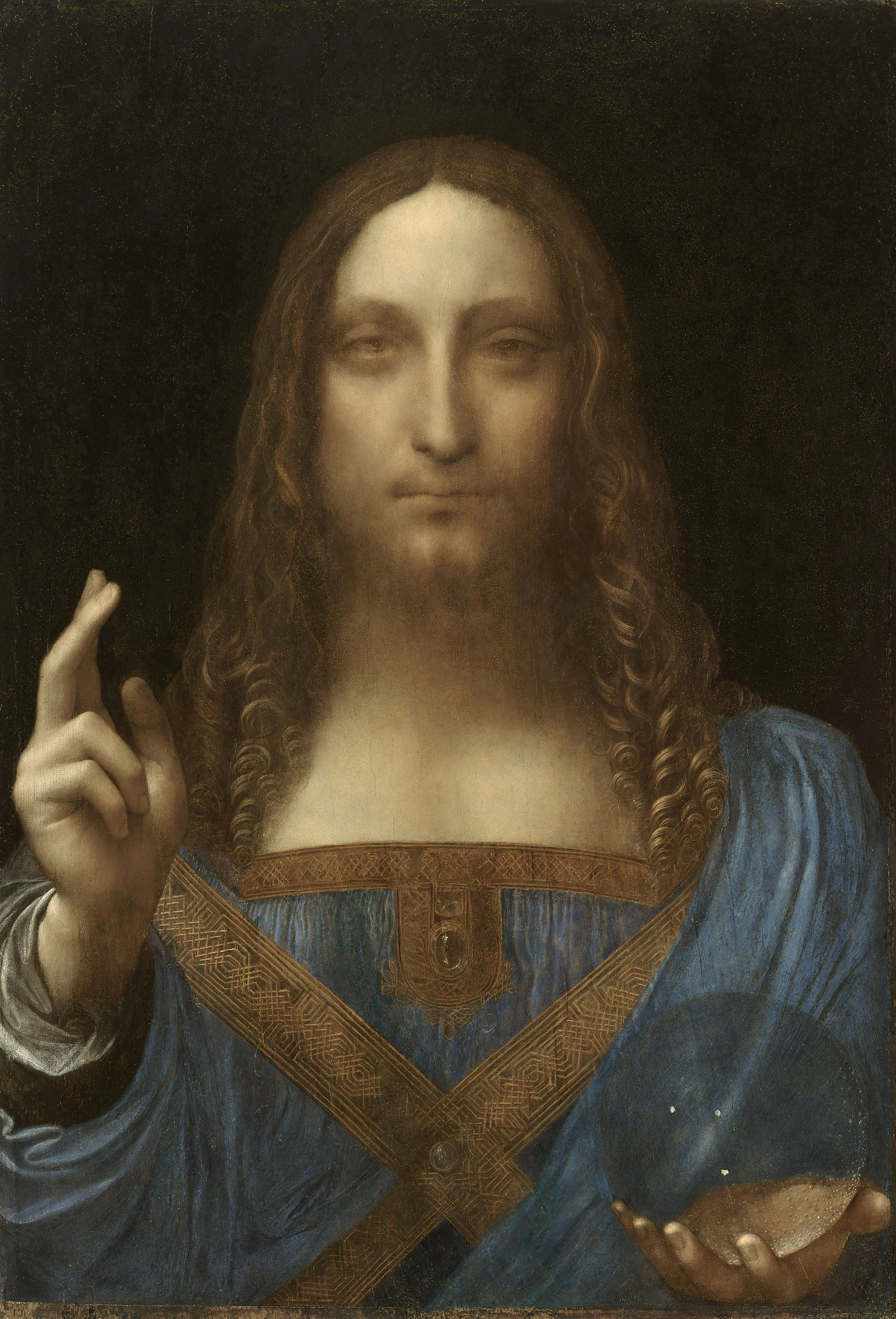
Leonardo da Vinci's Salvator Mundi

In New York, auction house Sotheby's became embroiled in the legal dispute in 2016 when the art dealers that had originally sold Da Vinci's Salvator Mundi painting to Bouvier learned that he had sold it to Rybolovlev at a much higher price. During a dinner in Paris, Bouvier, through his associate Jean-Marc Peretti, a former Parisian gaming club manager linked to money laundering investigations, negotiated the purchase of the painting for $80 million. However, Bouvier simultaneously communicated a different version of the negotiations to Rybolovlev's assistant, Mikhail Sazonov, suggesting a higher acquisition cost. Subsequently, Bouvier sold the artwork to Rybolovlev for $127.5 million, securing a substantial profit. Salvator Mundi was one of 13 artworks involved in transactions brokered by Samuel Valette, Sotheby’s Vice President for Private Sales.

According to court papers, Sotheby's was asked to clarify whether it had been aware that the painting was worth more than what the art dealers had sold it to Bouvier for, and whether the auction house had misled the dealers in favor of the Swiss trader. Email exchanges unearthed by Rybolovlev’s lawyers indicate that the practice of over-invoicing was systematic, with the intermediary regularly pushing his client to buy paintings without giving them the necessary reflection time for such investments.

In November that year, Sotheby's issued a pre-emptive suit in relation to Salvator Mundi, denying that it had ever been part of a scheme allegedly perpetrated by Bouvier to defraud both the sellers of the painting, and Rybolovlev.

On 11 June 2018, the United States District Court for the Southern District of New York granted Rybolovlev permission to access Sotheby's paperwork regarding its interactions with Bouvier for his ongoing lawsuits against the Swiss in Monaco and Switzerland.

Another ongoing US investigation into Bouvier and his alleged involvement in fraudulent activities was dropped in May 2018.

On 2 October 2018, Rybolovlev sued Sotheby's for $380 million, alleging the auction house had "materially assisted the largest art fraud in history" and that Sotheby's "knowingly and intentionally made the fraud possible" because it was aware of how much Bouvier had paid the original sellers of the paintings later purchased by Rybolovlev. Sotheby's called these allegations "baseless" and told Reuters it would seek to have the lawsuit dismissed in a New York court.

In what Sotheby’s called a “disappointing” decision, a US federal court in Manhattan rejected Sotheby’s request to have the case dismissed. On 25 June 2019, the court argued that the auction house did not present evidence that would justify the “exceptional circumstances” required to have the case thrown out. Instead, Sotheby’s was ordered to submit previously confidential details relevant to the case for consideration and was banned from redacting information from court documents.

A November 2019 ruling of a New York court compelled Sotheby’s to produce documents used in foreign criminal proceedings in the Affair in the jurisdictions of Switzerland and Monaco. Sotheby’s had fought against this decision, arguing that confidentiality and the fact that it was named in the Swiss proceedings should shield it from having to submit the documents, which the court rejected.

In March 2023, a U.S. District Court judge allowed the jury trial to proceed regarding the four works, namely Salvador Mundi by da Vinci, Rene Magritte’s Le Domaine d’Arnheim and Gustav Klimt’s Wasserschlangen II, as well Amedeo Modigliani’s Tête.

In January 2024, the jury at a New York Federal Court found for Sotheby's on all counts. A lawyer representing Sotheby's stated that the verdict "reaffirmed what we knew since the beginning, which was that Sotheby's played no role in any fraud or attempted fraud against Rybolovlev or anyone else."

== Impact ==
The Bouvier Affair has been widely reported and followed across the art world and beyond as it laid bare "the exploitation of art for financial gain" and put a spotlight on the business behaviors of middlemen in the art market.

Commentators have opined that the unfolding events could be the catalyst for a renewed push to reform the art sector.

In January 2026, the three-part documentary series The Oligarch and the Art Dealer, about the legal dispute between Dmitry Rybolovlev and Yves Bouver, premiered at the Sundance Film Festival in the US, followed by a screening at the CPH:DOX in Copenhagen (Denmark) and the Canneseries festival in Cannes (France).

In May 2026, following the release of the series by the Danish Broadcasting Corporation DR, Bouvier, through the law firm Kromann Reumert, demanded that the production company Elk Film alter or cancel its release. Director Andreas Dalsgaard stated that the producers refused to comply with these demands. Earlier, a Swiss court had rejected Bouvier’s request to block the screening of the series at the Vision du Réel festival in Nyon, Switzerland.
