= Wolfgang Beltracchi =

German art forger and artist (born 1951)

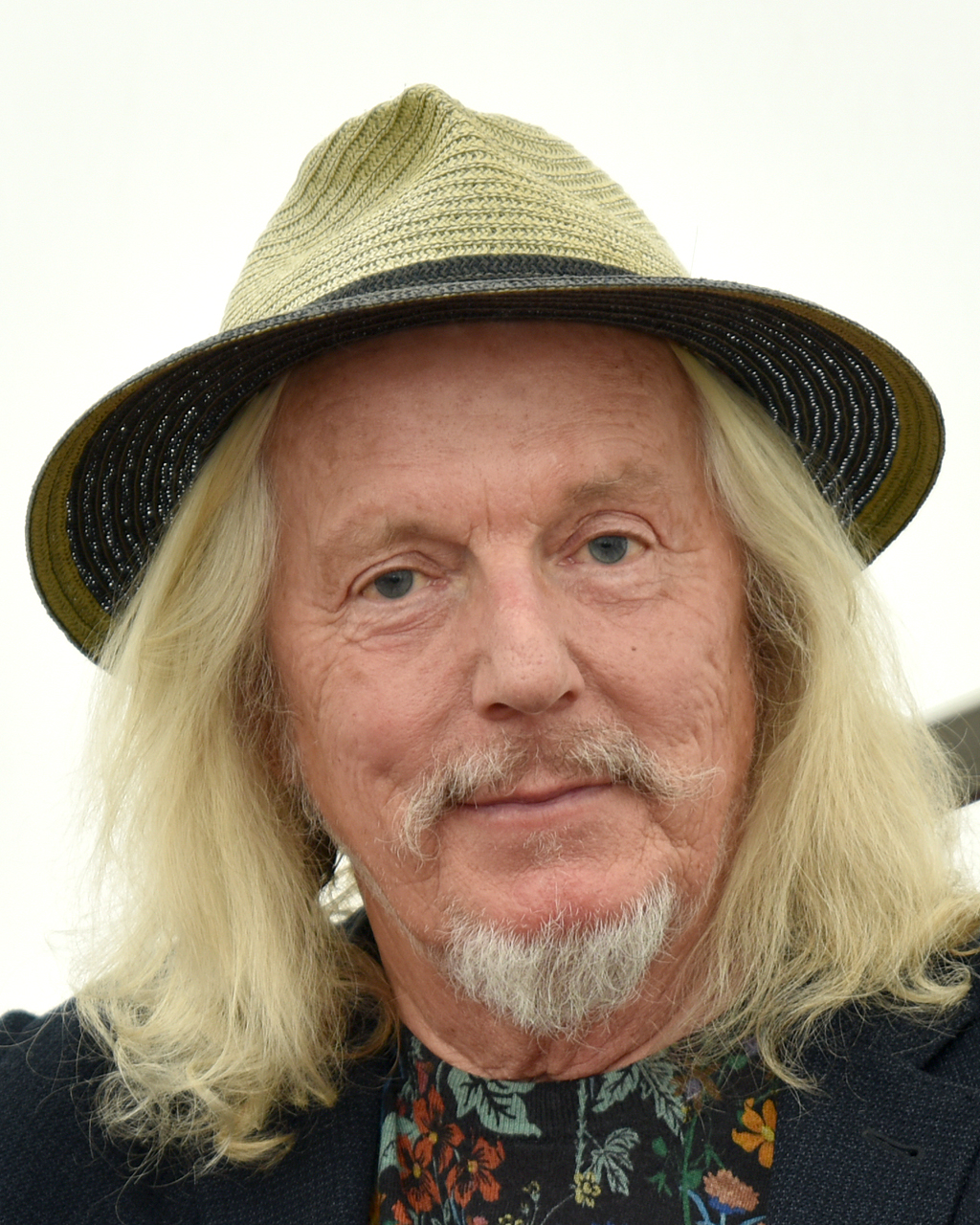
- Wolfgang Beltracchi (2024)
- Born: Wolfgang Fischer; 4 February 1951 (age 75); Höxter, North Rhine-Westphalia, West Germany
- Years active: 1965–2010
- Known for: Art forger
- Spouse: Helene Beltracchi (m. 1993)

Wolfgang Beltracchi (né Fischer; born 4 February 1951) is a German former art forger and visual artist who has admitted to forging hundreds of paintings in an international art scam netting millions of euros. Beltracchi, together with his wife Helene, sold forgeries of alleged works by famous artists, including Max Ernst, Heinrich Campendonk, Fernand Léger, and Kees van Dongen. Though he was found guilty for forging 14 works of art that sold for a combined $45m (£28.6m), he claims to have faked "about 50" artists. The total estimated profits Beltracchi made from his forgeries surpasses $100m.

In 2011, after a 40-day trial, Beltracchi was found guilty and sentenced to six years in a German prison. His wife, Helene, was given a four-year sentence, and both were ordered to pay millions in restitution. Beltracchi was freed on 9 January 2015, having served just over three years in prison.

Beltracchi is an artist who sells his paintings and sculptures to international collectors without the protection of art makers and the international art market.

== Biography ==
Wolfgang Fischer was born 4 February 1951 in Höxter, West Germany and grew up in Geilenkirchen, Germany. His father was an art restorer and muralist. According to his own statements, Beltracchi first copied a Pablo Picasso painting when he was 14 years old. He was expelled from secondary school when he was 17 and later went to art school in Aachen. As a young man, he used drugs such as LSD and opium and started doing art forgeries "a little." He travelled through Europe and lived in Amsterdam and Morocco. He also lived in Mallorca, Spain and France.

In the 1980s, Beltracchi ran an art gallery for a short time with a business partner. The two had a falling out, with the partner accusing Beltracchi of stealing paintings from his house, an accusation Beltracchi vehemently denies.

Fischer met Helene Beltracchi in 1992 and, after marrying in 1993, adopted her surname.

Beltracchi designed the artwork to The Fall of a Rebel Angel, the eighth studio album from German musical project Enigma. Since his release from prison, Wolfgang and Helene Beltracchi have been living and working as artists on Lake Lucerne in Switzerland.

== Forgeries ==
Beltracchi did not copy existing and well known paintings, but painted his own paintings imitating the style of the artists in question. He made up the titles and motives, or claimed that a painting of his was a lost work that was only known by its title in old documents or catalogs.

He and his wife also established a false provenance for the works, claiming that Helene Beltracchi's grandfather—the wealthy industrialist Werner Jägers—had been friends with the German-Jewish art dealer Alfred Flechtheim in the 1920s. They claimed that Flechtheim sold a cache of works to Jägers before going into exile during the Second World War. Many of the paintings that Wolfgang Beltracchi sold (forged by him) allegedly came from this collection.

There were several important holes in this story. For one, the Düsseldorf Alfred Flechtheim gallery's expert, Ralph Jentsch, recognised that a label used to authenticate one of the forgeries, was in itself a forgery. Secondly, Jägers was a teenager in the 1930s, and thus would have been too young to know any art dealers. And third, Jägers had been a member of the Nazi Party in the 1930s, and later served in the Reich army during the Second World War, making it unlikely that he would have befriended a Jewish dealer.

Beltracchi's labels purported his works came from the 'Flechtheim Collection' and on the verso had a strategically placed adhesive label bearing a picture based on a miniature woodcut in portrait format, the lower half of which had a rough sketch, depicting the storied gallery's owner in profile. Space has been left for adding the artist's name or the title of the work by hand; in the upper third, rough capital letters on a black background boldly spell out the words Sammlung Flechtheim. Despite all this, his story held enough weight for the Beltracchis to use it for many years.

When the credibility of the story was questioned, the Beltracchis constructed "proof" that the paintings had been in the family since the 1920s. They delivered photographs seemingly of Helene Beltracchi's grandmother in a room with the paintings in question in the background. In reality, the photographs had been produced by Wolfgang Beltracchi himself using an antique camera and film; the woman on the photographs being Helene Beltracchi, dressed up as her own grandmother. They also created fake labels proclaiming that the paintings were from the "Sammlung Flechtheim"—the Flechtheim Collection.

Finally he was caught after having sold a work 'by' Heinrich Campendonk via Kunsthaus Lempertz. The painting was then sold to a company in Malta for €2.88 million. Beltracchi had used a paint tube produced in the Netherlands. Technical analysis by Nicholas Eastaugh revealed that the paint contained titanium white (which was not specified on the label), a pigment that had not been in use in Campendonk's times. As Beltracchi remembered, because he had not mixed his own paint this one time, the forgery was uncovered.

== Arrest and trial ==
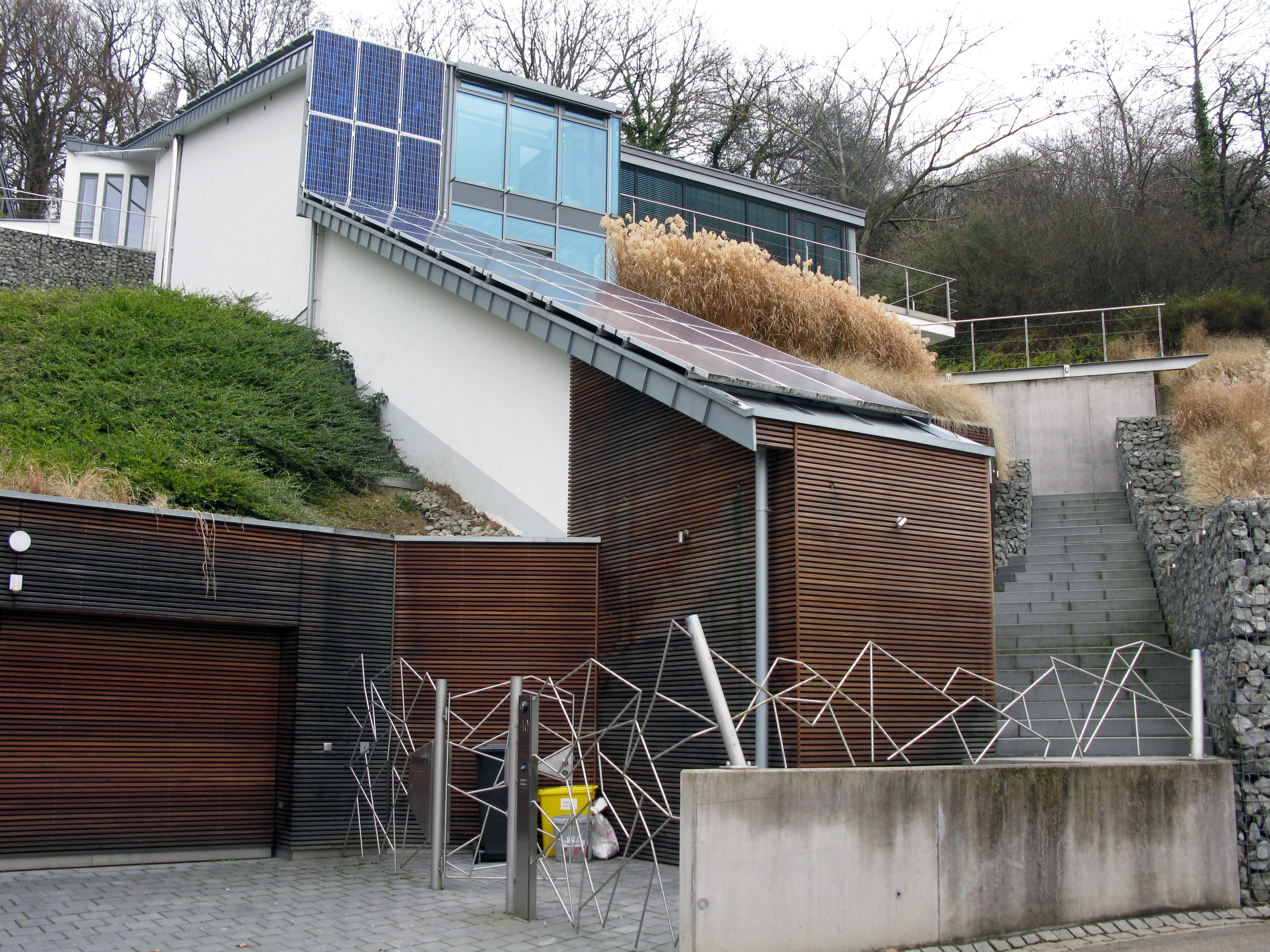
The Beltracchis' erstwhile villa in Freiburg-Herdern.

Wolfgang and Helene Beltracchi were arrested on 27 August 2010 in Freiburg. Their accomplice Otto Schulte-Kellinghaus, who helped place several of the forgeries in the market, was arrested on 1 December 2010.

During the trial in autumn 2011, Beltracchi admitted forging 14 paintings: three by Heinrich Campendonk; two by André Derain; one by Kees van Dongen; five by Max Ernst; one by Fernand Léger; and two by Max Pechstein. Beltracchi and his accomplices thank their relatively mild sentences to a deal with the parties involved. Originally the court had planned to hear more than 160 witnesses and ten experts. The prosecutor estimated that Beltracchi had made a profit of €16 million.

On 27 October 2011, Beltracchi was sentenced to six years in jail. His wife Helene was sentenced to four years, and Otto Schulte-Kellinghaus to five years. Helene's sister Jeanette was given a 21-month suspended sentence.

=== Aftermath ===
Wolfgang and Helene Beltracchi were allowed to serve their sentences in an open prison, as long as they had regular jobs. They were employed by a friend's photostudio, leaving prison in the morning and returning after work. While serving his sentence, Beltracchi, in collaboration with a photographer, produced a number of mixed-media works, including paintings embedding photographs of himself. The collaboration ended in September 2012. Helene Beltracchi was released from prison in February 2013. Wolfgang Beltracchi was released from prison in January 2015. He agreed to paint only in his own name and to move from Germany to France.

On 23 February 2015, the CBS News program 60 Minutes interviewed Wolfgang Beltracchi after his release from prison in Germany.

In 2012, journalists Stefan Koldehoff and Tobias Timm published a book about the Beltracchi case. Koldehoff and Timm were awarded the 2012 Annette Giacometti Prize for their work.

In January 2014, Helene and Wolfgang Beltracchi published two books: an autobiography and a collection of letters the pair wrote to each other while in prison.

Beltracchi – Die Kunst der Fälschung (English: Beltracchi: The Art of Forgery), a 2014 documentary about Beltracchi by German filmmaker Arne Birkenstock, won the 2014 German Film Award for Best Documentary Film. Arne Birkenstock's father Reinhard Birkenstock is Wolfgang and Helene Beltracchi's legal counsel.

Beltracchi's forgeries embarrassed many art evaluation firms and numerous customers have sought legal remedy against the art specialists who mistakenly certified the artworks' authenticity.

Burkhard Leismann, director of the Kunstmuseum Ahlen, was charged 19 February 2013 with being an accomplice in the attempted sale of a fake Fernand Léger painting titled Nature morte while knowing the painting to be fake. Leismann denied the charges. The case was closed without going to trial, after Leismann signed a deal with German authorities in April 2014 and paid a €7500 fine. According to his lawyer, a trial would have proven Leismann's innocence, but he wanted the case to be closed quickly.

A French tribunal ruled on 24 May 2013 that Werner Spies and gallery owner Jacques de La Béraudière were to pay an art collector €652,883. The collector had bought Tremblement de terre, a fake painting by Max Ernst, after Spies had declared it to be a genuine Max Ernst painting. However, this decision was overturned by the Court of Appeal of Versailles which ruled that Spies had "expresse[d] an opinion outside of a determined transaction" and could not therefore "be charged with a responsibility equivalent to that of an expert consulted in the context of a sale". The Court further held that it "cannot be required of the author of a catalogue raisonné to subject each work in a catalogue published under his responsibility to the execution of a scientific expert assessment, which requires the removal of fragments of the work and represents a significant cost".

A film Beltracchi: The Art of Forgery was released in 2014. The BBC reports that Wolfgang Beltracchi makes "thousands if not millions" from selling his original works.

== Exhibitions ==
=== Solo exhibitions ===
- 2014: Der Jahrhundertfälscher. Galerie Christine Brügger, Bern
- 2015: FREIHEIT. art room9, München / Deutschland
- 2015: Im Dunkel der Wälder. Kurt Mühlenhaupt Museum, Bergsdorf
- 2016: Nabocov. Galerie Christine Brügger, Bern
- 2016: Free Method Painting. art room9, temporary Basel
- 2017: Ballets Russes, Galerie Lilian Andrée, Riehen
- 2018: Kairos. Der Richtige Moment, Biblioteca Nazionale Marciana, Venedig
- 2018/2019: Kairos. Der Richtige Moment, Barlach Halle K, Hamburg
- 2019: Kairos. Der Richtige Moment, Bank Austria-Kunstforum Wien, Wien
- 2019: Bilder aus Kairos.DerRichtigeMoment Schloss Esterházy Lockenhaus, Burgenland
- 2019: Kairos. Der richtige Moment, mSE Kunsthalle, Unterammergau
- 2021: The Greats – Salvator Mundi, Tonhalle Zürich
- 2023: Galerie Christine Brügger, Bern, Beltracchi/Venzago, Die Wiederkehr des Salvator Mundi, Bern
- Galerie Dutoit, Unterentfelden, W.Beltracchi/F.Beltracchi, Zusammen, aber nicht im Doppelpack
- 2024: Engel, Galerie Lilian Andree, Basel-Riehen
- Noah, Galerie Christine Brügger, Bern

=== Group exhibitions ===
- 1978: Große Kunstausstellung. Haus der Kunst, München / Deutschland
- 2015: Mona, Galerie Kornfeld · 68 Projects. Berlin / Deutschland

=== Art projects ===
- Art on ice. scenery by Wolfgang Beltracchi
- Kairos. Der Richtige Moment
- The Greats by Beltracchi

=== Public collection ===
- msE-Kunsthalle, Unterammergau, Germany
- Messer Mountain Museum, Bozen, Italy

== Known forged paintings ==
Police have identified 58 paintings they suspect were forged by Beltracchi. Beltracchi has claimed he has forged hundreds of paintings by more than 50 different artists.

To provide a provenance for their fake works of art, Beltracchi and his associates fabricated stories about their grandparents who they claimed had been art collectors in the 1920s: the Sammlung Knops and Sammlung Werner Jägers. The Sammlung Knops (Knops Collection) had allegedly belonged to master tailor Johann Wilhelm Knops from Krefeld, grandfather of Otto Schulte-Kellinghaus; Sammlung Werner Jägers (Werner Jägers Collection) had allegedly belonged to Werner Jägers, Helene Beltracchi's grandfather.

Johann Wilhelm Knops and Werner Jägers were claimed to have been customers of Alfred Flechtheim. Many of the forgeries were labelled with his name. While Knops and Jägers existed, they had not been important art collectors.

=== List of known forgeries ===
The Bundesverband Deutscher Kunstversteigerer (German Federation of Art Auctioneers), as a section of its database of known forgeries has published a catalogue of works from the fictional Sammlung Jägers which have been investigated by the LKA. The catalogue lists 54 paintings as per October 2012, fakes presented as works by 24 different artists, including Heinrich Campendonk, Max Ernst, Auguste Herbin, Louis Marcoussis, André Derain, Jean Metzinger, Raoul Dufy, Kees van Dongen and Fernand Léger.

=== Notable cases ===
==== Porträt Oskar Schlemmer by Johannes Molzahn ====
In 1987, Loretto Molzahn, widow of Johannes Molzahn, paid a Berlin dealer DM60,000 for a portrait her husband had painted in 1930 of Oskar Schlemmer. The dealer had acquired the painting from Wolfgang Fischer. The painting proved to be fake and the Berlin dealer was given a suspended sentence in 1998.

==== Bouquet varié by Moïse Kisling ====
In 2012, Bouquet varié (mixed bouquet), purportedly a 1937 painting by Moïse Kisling, was listed by French auctioneers Millon to be auctioned in Dubai on 22 October 2012, with an estimate of $150,000–200,000. As its provenance were listed Sammlung Jägers, Köln, Sammlung Beltracchi, Palma, and an auction on 23 March 1994 at Sotheby's in London. The painting was withdrawn from auction when questions were raised about its authenticity. When asked about the painting, Beltracchi commented he "had painted many bouquets of flowers during his life".

Research by Die Zeit revealed that two versions of the painting exist. The painting offered in Dubai had actually been sold by Sotheby's in 1993. The painting sold by Sotheby's in 1994 is different and its whereabouts are unknown.

==== La Forêt (2) by Max Ernst ====
In 2004, Beltracchi and his associates sold La Forêt (2), a fake 1927 Max Ernst oil painting, after Werner Spies had appraised it and had issued a certificate of authenticity. He then put Wolfgang's wife Helene in touch with Swiss art dealer Yves Bouvier, best known for the Bouvier Affair, who then sold the painting to investment firm Salomon Trading for €1.8 million ($2.3 million).

Galerie Cazeau-Béraudière lent it to the Max Ernst Museum for a 2006 exhibition and subsequently sold it to collector Daniel Filipacchi for $7 million. The painting is now listed as a forgery from the Sammlung Jägers and is one of the five Max Ernst paintings Beltracchi admitted to forging during the 2011 trial.

==== Nature morte by Fernand Léger ====
In early 2006, Otto Schulte-Kellinghaus tried, unsuccessfully, to sell this painting via Parisian art dealers. Together with a forged André Derain painting, it was taken to Kunstmuseum Ahlen in July 2009 where it was shown to prospective customers, including Christie's, which rejected it. Provenance of the painting was the fictional Sammlung Jägers. A deal was being negotiated to sell the painting for €5.8 million to an unknown buyer, when it was seized in the museum by police 25 August 2010. It is one of the fourteen paintings Beltracchi admitted to forging.

==== Landschaft mit Pferden by Heinrich Campendonk ====
In July 2004, Steve Martin paid Paris gallery Cazeau-Béraudière €700,000 for Landschaft mit Pferden (Landscape with horses), supposedly painted by Heinrich Campendonk in 1915. Not knowing it was fake, in February 2006 Martin sold the painting through Christie's to a Swiss businesswoman for €500,000. The painting is now listed as a forgery from the Sammlung Jägers and is one of the fourteen paintings Beltracchi admitted to forging.

==== Rotes Bild mit Pferden by Heinrich Campendonk ====
In November 2006, Beltracchi and associates sold Rotes Bild mit Pferden (Red Picture with Horses), supposedly a 1914 painting by Heinrich Campendonk, to Trasteco, a Maltese company, for €2.88 million through Lempertz auctioneers in Cologne. "Rotes Bild mit Pferden" was found to be fake by Artvera's gallery, based in Switzerland. In 2008, a scientific analysis showed the painting contained titanium white, which was not yet available in 1914. Experts identified old gallery labels on the back of the painting as fake. The painting is now listed as a forgery from the Sammlung Jägers and is one of the fourteen paintings Beltracchi admitted to forging.

Trasteco sued for damages, and on 28 September 2012 a court in Cologne ruled in its favor: Lempertz was to reimburse Trasteco the full amount. Lempertz announced it would appeal.

In December 2012, the case was settled, with some of Beltracchi's real estate being sold to repay Trasteco €2 million. Lempertz reimbursed Trasteco its €800,000 sales commission as well as some additional costs. This is the first instance of Beltracchi's refunding a buyer of one of his forgeries.
