= Yves Bouvier =

Swiss businessman and art dealer

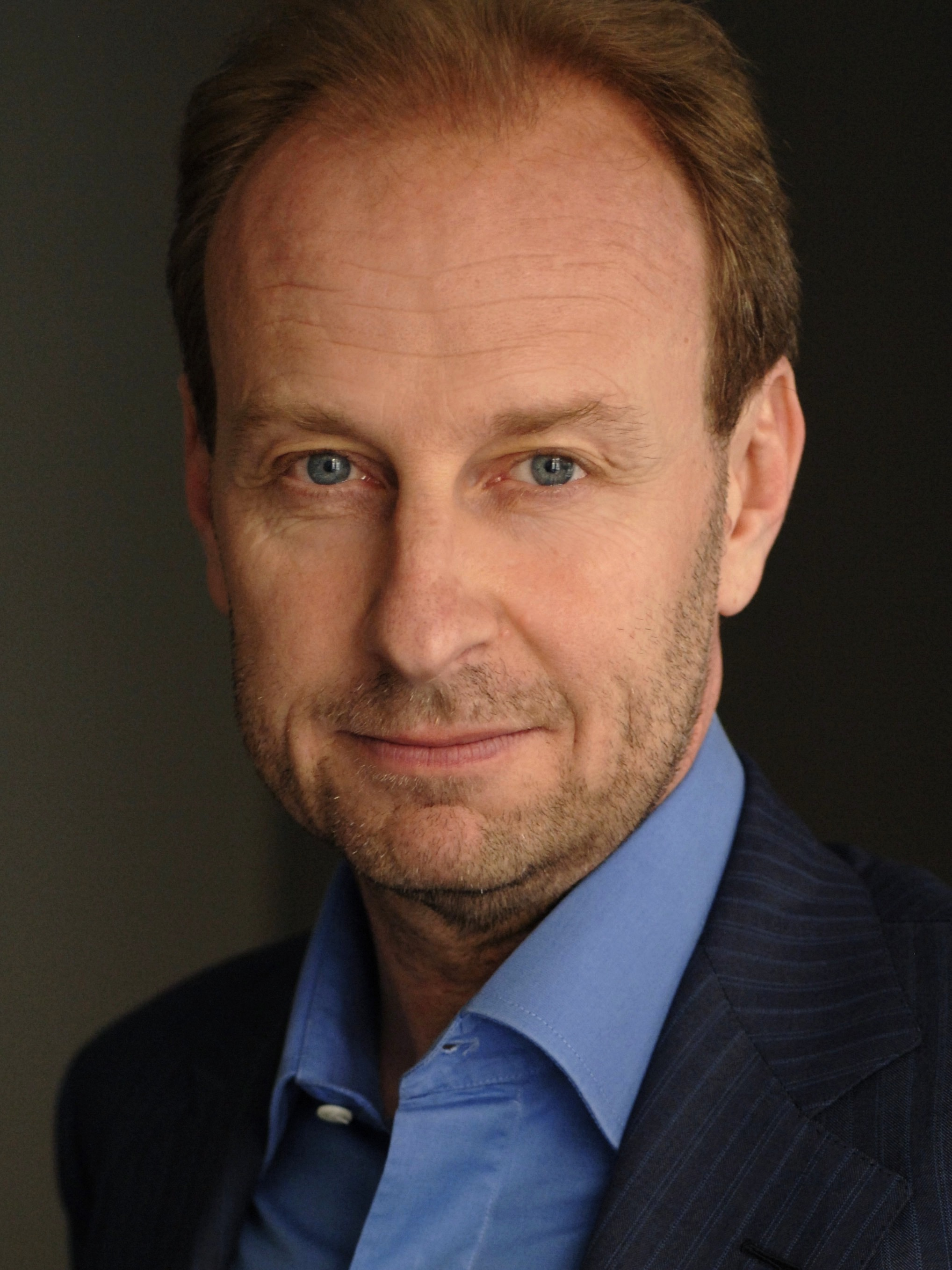
- Bouvier in 2008
- Born: 8 September 1963 (age 63); Geneva, Switzerland
- Occupations: CEO, Natural Le Coultre
- Known for: Businessman and art dealer
- Parent: Jean-Jacques Bouvier

Yves Bouvier (born 8 September 1963) is a Swiss businessman and art dealer best known for his role in the Bouvier Affair that resulted in criminal charges being brought and dismissed against him in France and Monaco by Russian oligarch Dmitry Rybolovlev. He was the president of Natural Le Coultre, an international company specialising in the transportation, storage, scientific analysis, and conservation of works of art, luxurious goods and other collectables.

Bouvier has faced lawsuits filed by Rybolovlev in Singapore, Hong Kong, New York, Monaco, and Geneva since 2015. All legal proceedings, however, have been dismissed by the authorities.

In December 2023 Bouvier and Rybolovlev were reported to have reached an agreement and set aside all of their remaining legal disputes in all jurisdictions.

In September 2017, it emerged that Bouvier was under criminal investigation by Swiss authorities amid allegations that he may have evaded more than 100 million euros in taxes related to his cross-border art dealings. As of 2024, Yves Bouvier was ordered to pay 730 million Swiss francs in unpaid taxes.

== Early life ==
Yves Bouvier was born in Geneva, Switzerland, the son of Jean-Jacques Bouvier, owner of Natural Le Coultre, a 150-year-old company specialized in moving and storing goods.

He spent his childhood in Avully, a small village situated near the border with France. He had a sister who was born with a disability and died later in life.

Yves Bouvier developed an early interest in art and dropped out of college to join his father's company in the eighties.

== Business career ==
=== Natural Le Coultre ===
Natural Transports was formed in 1859 as a moving and furniture storage company. It later became Natural Le Coultre in 1901, when Albert-Maurice Natural joined Emile-Étienne Le Coultre to create A. Natural, Le Coultre & Cie. The company's office was located in Geneva. The firm was mainly dealing with commodity deliveries, including fruits, equipment and Red Cross parcels during the First World War.

In 1953, Jean-Jacques Bouvier began an apprenticeship at Natural Le Coultre S.A. 30 years later in 1983, the Bouvier family acquired Natural Le Coultre. In 1989, Jean-Jacques and Yves Bouvier formed Fine Art Transports Natural Le Coultre SA in Geneva, which provided moving and furniture storage services to the local companies. Hoping that Yves would keep leading the family business, Jean-Jacques Bouvier promoted his son to the position of assistant manager in 1995 and then managing director in 1997, selling the moving and furniture storage activities to a local company to focus the company on storing, moving, and preserving pieces of art. Yves Bouvier moved to Singapore in 2009 where he currently resides.

Under Bouvier's control, Natural Le Coultre owned 5 per cent of the Geneva freeport, but the company was sold to André Chenue, a Parisian shipping firm, in 2017 for an undisclosed amount.

In 2017, in line with the investigation into Bouvier's potential tax-evasion, Federal Tax Administration (FTA) officials temporarily sequestered one of Natural Le Coultre's buildings in Geneva, worth 4.5 million Swiss francs.

=== Freeport facilities ===
Bouvier exported the freeport concept, and in 2005, expanded his business model abroad by creating "artistic hubs" grouped into freeport facilities that offer services and rental facilities to art collectors, museums and companies, expanding into Singapore in 2010 and Luxembourg in 2014. Another facility was planned in Shanghai for 2017, though the project has been suspended.

The freeports have been subject to increased scrutiny by authorities and governments in recent years. For example, a study by the European Parliament’s think tank described their high security and discretion as a risk for tax evasion and money laundering. A European Commission report also concluded that these facilities "could be abused for trade of counterfeited goods, money laundering and other crime if no sufficient checks are carried out to identify the owners of companies using them." Furthermore, a 2016 UNESCO report detailed the possibility that freeports can be used by art dealers to trade stolen, looted or illegally excavated objects, even many years later. The facilities have been alleged to be a point of sale for expensive art, for example, to museums.

==== Geneva Freeport ====
The oldest freeport facility, the Swiss government holds the majority stake of 85 per cent with Bouvier holding a 5 per cent stake. Bouvier sold his majority participation in 2017 after the Swiss government passed stricter oversight rules over customs warehouses. According to media reports, the freeport has been linked to the trafficking of looted artifacts from Syria, and is regarded as a risk for money-laundering and tax-evasion operations by the European Union.

==== Singapore Freeport ====
Bouvier built a subsidiary to the Geneva freeport in Singapore in 2010, after the idea was floated with the Singaporean government as early as 2005. The facilities host primarily works of art, but vintage cars, wine, jewellery, and gold bars of Deutsche Bank until July 2019, when the bank ceased its usage of the facility. Unlike in Geneva's freeport, in which Bouvier is a minority stakeholder, he holds a majority stake in the Singapore facility, describing the idea of the facility a "great success." The Singapore freeport has been for sale since 2017. In 2022, Bouvier sold the Singapore freeport to a company of a Chinese crypto billionaire Jihan Wu for S$40 million (US$28.4 million). In 2010, the cost of building the facility that later came to be known as Asia's “Fort Knox” was S$100 million, or about US$70 million.

==== Luxembourg Freeport ====
The freeport was inaugurated on 17 September 2014. Originally under the control of Yves Bouvier, among the shareholders of the freeport also were Olivier Thomas, a French art dealer and the former president of its board, as well as Jean-Marc Peretti, a former manager of a Parisian gaming club who became associated with money laundering investigations.

The Freeport has been under criticism from the EU since 2018 when it was found to be an enabler for tax evasion by two MEPs. German MEP Wolf Klinz in 2019 demanded the freeport be closed for its alleged role in facilitating money laundering and tax evasion. After another visit to the facility later that year, several more MEPs echoed the call to phase out freeports across the EU, calling them a “black hole” beyond the authorities’ control. In 2024, Bouvier sold his shareholding in what is now called the Luxembourg High Security Hub to his business partner Olivier Thomas, a former president and early investor in the facility. The transaction price has not been disclosed.

=== Other contributions ===
In 2004 Bouvier founded the company Art Culture Studio which organizes cultural events, restores furniture, and provides support to the Renaissance Foundation for Russian Country Homes, a non-profit organization that supports research on the restoration of cultural and historic buildings in rural areas. Art Culture Studio helped renovate the 18th-century furniture for the boudoir of Empress Josephine in 2012.

He initiated and chaired the Moscow World Fine Art Fair in 2004, a yearly exhibition taking place in May for art dealers and collectors. He also contributed to the establishment of the Salzburg World Fine Art Fair.

In 2015, Bouvier initiated the creation of the Singapore Pinacothèque de Paris, an expansion of Pinacothèque de Paris. The museum was closed in 2016 without explanation. Art Heritage Singapore, the company behind the project and of which Bouvier was a shareholder, was subsequently sued by media and security companies involved in the project for almost $900,000.

Bouvier was involved with the "pôle R4" project, an artistic "micro-city" on the site of a former Renault factory in Seguin Island, Paris. The project, designed by French architect Jean Nouvel, was until September 2016 managed and financed by Bouvier, and was scheduled to open in 2017. In September 2016 it was announced that Bouvier had sold his entire stake to the Emerige Group and its financial partner, Addax and Oryx Group Limited (AOG). Artnet noted that the transaction frees the project from its association from Bouvier.

Yves Bouvier was also an executive of an energy drinks company Sin Thirst Sin, which apparently never properly produced or marketed its beverages.

== Lawsuits ==
=== Dispute with Dmitry Rybolovlev ===
In 2015, Russian billionaire Dmitry Rybolovlev accused Yves Bouvier of defrauding him out of nearly $1 billion via the sale of artwork at inflated prices while he was employed as a consultant and was receiving a commission of 2 per cent on the value of each purchase.

Bouvier has denied all claims, stating that he presented himself as the seller of the artwork, rather than an adviser and that the 2 percent fee related to the transportation, storage and certification service that he provided.

Yves Bouvier met Rybolovlev for the first time in 2003, when he came to see him for the occasion of the delivery of the Marc Chagall painting, Le Cirque. Tania Rappo, a friend of the Rybolovlev family, organized the purchase of Marc Chagall's Le Cirque painting for $6 million. When the painting arrived at the premises of Natural Le Coultre, located in the Geneva freeport, the canvas did not have a certificate of authenticity guaranteeing that the artwork was an original. Rybolovlev feared he had been scammed, but Bouvier acquired the certificate a few days later and requested Rappo to organize a meeting with the Rybolovlev at their home in Cologny. Rybolovlev did not know then that the Finatrading company, which had sold him the Chagall, was in fact the property of Yves Bouvier. Bouvier promised Rappo that he would give her a commission for every work sold to Rybolovlev, for introducing him to the billionaire. Bouvier subsequently acquired a total of 38 artworks between 2003 and 2014 for Rybolovlev, including Vincent van Gogh, Pablo Picasso and Amedeo Modigliani.

As reported in media, the Russian learned of the alleged fraud from Sandy Heller, an art adviser who had sold Modigliani's Nude on a blue cushion for $93.5 million to Bouvier, who then sold it to Rybolovlev for $118 million. This prompted Rybolovlev to file for fraud and money laundering in Monaco.

In February 2015, Bouvier was arrested in Monaco on suspicion of defrauding Dmitry Rybolovlev. Bouvier was released on a €10 million bail. He was accused of fraud as a result of excessive margins on the sale of paintings, such as on Leonardo da Vinci's Salvator Mundi with a margin of €50 million. Rybolovlev learned from a New York Times article that the painting had been sold for $75 million in 2013, although he had paid Bouvier $127.5 million for it. Rybolovlev also accused Jean-Marc Peretti and Tania Rappo of being involved in the fraudulent dealings surrounding the art sales. Both Peretti and Rappo reportedly earned significant commissions as part of these transactions. Rappo, who was a close friend of Bouvier, was allegedly involved in facilitating the deals, while Peretti, a former manager of a Parisian gaming club who became associated with money laundering investigations, played a crucial role in the negotiations, particularly for high-value pieces as Salvador Mundi. Bouvier himself acknowledged Peretti's talent as a negotiator, often comparing his skills to playing poker. Bouvier denied all accusations, argued that he first heard about the complaint was when he was arrested, and that the price of the paintings had been agreed by both parties. Bouvier also called for an investigation into HSBC’s provision of a letter to Monaco police that falsely stated that he and a co-defendant in a money laundering case, Tania Rappo, shared an account at the bank. HSBC responded that this was a simple and clerical mistake.

In March 2015, Singapore's High Court ordered the global freezing of Bouvier's assets, but it was reported that the assets were unfrozen in August of that year on the grounds that Rybolovlev's approach constituted an abuse of process.

In November 2015, Rybolovlev and his lawyer Tetiana Bersheda were briefly placed in custody in Monaco following a complaint filed by Tania Rappo. Rappo accused Rybolovlev’s lawyer of invasion of privacy. Bersheda earlier recorded a private conversation during a private dinner with Rappo and Rybolovlev, in an attempt to prove that Rappo was Yves Bouvier’s accomplice. Rappo also accused Dmitry Rybolovlev and Monaco’s former public prosecutor, Jean-Pierre Dreno, of the collusion.

In March 2016, the High Court of Singapore dismissed Bouvier's attempt to suspend the civil suit filed in the territory, but the case was transferred to the Singapore International Commercial Court, which deals specifically with cross-border commercial disputes. In May 2016, Bouvier's lawyers filed an appeal against the High Court's ruling, arguing the case should be heard in Switzerland rather than Singapore.

In March 2016, following the lead of European authorities, US Federal prosecutors opened an investigation into Bouvier, whom they described as "one of the art world’s consummate insiders."

In April 2016, Bouvier entered a new phase of his campaign to clear his name by hiring global PR group, CNC Communications & Network Consulting, part of French giant Publicis Groupe.

On 18 April 2017, the Singapore Court of Appeal overturned the High Court's decision, ruling that the case should be heard in Switzerland and ordering the action in Singapore to be stayed.

At the beginning of 2017, in the context of her defence, Tetiana Bersheda handed over her mobile phone to the Monaco police to allow the offending recording to be examined. Bersheda maintained that the recording concerned a professional conversation and was therefore authorized by Monegasque law.

In July 2017, Monaco's investigative magistrate at the time received a comprehensive IT report of the contents of Tetiana Bersheda's phone. It contained over 8,900 text messages that revealed communication between Rybolovlev's lawyer and Monaco's high-level officials prior to Bouvier's arrest.

In September 2017, a case against Rybolovlev was opened in Monaco for corruption and influence peddling.

In June 2018, the US investigation against Bouvier was closed without any charges made against the art dealer.

In February 2018, a federal prosecutor in Geneva opened a criminal investigation into Yves Bouvier on charges of fraud against Dmitry Rybolovlev. However, in December 2023, the Geneva Prosecutor's Office closed the criminal investigation into Bouvier, stating that it had found "no evidence to raise sufficient suspicions against the defendants." All nine lawsuits filed by Rybolovlev in Singapore, Hong Kong, New York, Monaco, and Geneva against Bouvier were dismissed. In June 2018, the US investigation against Bouvier was closed without any charges made against the art dealer.

In July 2019, Rybolovlev and Bersheda appealed to the European Court of Human Rights claiming that the investigating judge in Monaco had exceeded his remit with regard to the invasion of privacy case.

In November 2023, the case against Rybolovlev and Monaco's former public prosecutor, Jean-Pierre Dreno, who were accused by Tania Rappo of collusion in her complaint of breach of privacy, was dismissed.

In December 2023, Rybolovlev and Bouvier reached an agreement and set aside all their remaining legal disputes in all jurisdictions. The settlement was described by Bouvier's lawyers as a "complete victory."

In June 2024, the European Court of Human Rights ruled that the investigating judge and other Monegasque authorities had acted illegally against Tetiana Bersheda, Dmitry Rybolovlev's lawyer. In March 2024, Tetiana Bersheda was cleared of any wrongdoing in the case brough by Tania Rappo for invasion of privacy.

=== Media coverage ===
In January 2026, the three-part documentary series The Oligarch and the Art Dealer, about the legal dispute between Dmitry Rybolovlev and Yves Bouver, premiered at the Sundance Film Festival in the US, followed by a screening at the CPH:DOX in Copenhagen (Denmark) and the Canneseries festival in Cannes (France).

In May 2026, following the release of the series by the Danish Broadcasting Corporation DR, Bouvier, through the law firm Kromann Reumert, demanded that the production company Elk Film alter or cancel its release. Director Andreas Dalsgaard stated that the producers refused to comply with these demands. Earlier, a Swiss court had rejected Bouvier's request to block the screening of the series at the Vision du Réel festival in Nyon, Switzerland.

=== Role of Sotheby’s ===
Rybolovlev also accused auction house Sotheby's of being complicit in Bouvier's alleged defrauding scheme. According to Rybolovlev, Sotheby's was involved in his purchase through Bouvier of 15 masterpieces, including “Salvator Mundi” of Leonardo da Vinci, which was originally bought by Bouvier from Sotheby's for $83 million and sold to Rybolovlev a day later for $127,5 million. The Russian subsequently accused Sotheby's of having knowingly and willingly assisted in the fraud.

In June 2019, the US District Court for the Southern District of New York ordered that email exchanges between Bouvier and Sotheby's vice chairman of worldwide private sales Samuel Valette which were previously confidential due to Sotheby's motion to seal certain documents must be submitted to the court.

According to the files, the process involved a request from Yves Bouvier for Valette to send an evaluation approved by Sotheby's which was to be transferred to Rybolovlev, indicating that Bouvier and Valette apparently coordinated on the value of the appraisals which Bouvier then sent to his client. Bouvier subsequently purchased paintings – via Sotheby's – for amounts lower than those indicated in the valuation, before reselling them to Rybolovlev, mostly at prices higher than those indicated in the evaluation of the auction house. The transaction history that Sotheby's has provided for certain works omits sales to Bouvier, although Valette has personally been involved in many of these sales.

Both Bouvier and Sotheby's have denied any wrongdoing.

In November 2019, the New York Court of Appeals decided that Sotheby's had to provide documents requested in the context of proceedings initiated by foreign jurisdictions in which the auction house is involved, including for proceedings between Yves Bouvier and Dmitry Rybolovlev in Switzerland.

In March 2023, a U.S. District Court judge allowed the jury trial to proceed regarding the four works, namely Salvador Mundi by da Vinci, Rene Magritte's Le Domaine d’Arnheim and Gustav Klimt’s Wasserschlangen II, as well Amedeo Modigliani’s Tête.

In January 2024, the jury at a New York Federal Court found for Sotheby's on all counts that Rybolovlev had alleged. A lawyer representing Sotheby's stated that the verdict "reaffirmed what we knew since the beginning, which was that Sotheby's played no role in any fraud or attempted fraud against Rybolovlev or anyone else." Sotheby's legal team, however, described Bouvier's tactics in the following manner, saying that “he would sell the art to Rybolovlev at marked-up prices, and tell Rybolovlev fabricated stories about hard-fought negotiations with the original sellers that supposedly drove up the prices”. Bouvier stated that his "name is now cleared", adding that the Geneva Prosecutor's decision to dismiss the case marked the "end of a nine-year nightmare. Courts all around the world have now unanimously concluded that I was innocent."

=== Other legal cases ===
==== Lorette Shefner ====
Bouvier was connected to a legal case involving a Canadian collector named Lorette Shefner in 2008. Shefner's family claims that she was the victim of a complex fraud, whereby she was persuaded to sell a Soutine painting at a price far below market value, only to see the work later sold to the National Gallery of Art in Washington DC for a much higher price. According to New York court papers from 2013, Bouvier was accused of having conspired "to disguise the true ownership" of pieces of art to defraud the Shefner estate.

==== Wolfgang Beltracchi ====
In a separate incident, Bouvier's purported connections to Galerie Jacques de la Béraudière and his ownership of an off-shore entity called Diva Fine Arts led him to be connected to the case of Wolfgang Beltracchi, a German forger convicted in 2011 of defrauding a number of collectors, including Daniel Filipacchi, of millions of dollars. According to a media report, Bouvier came first in contact with Beltracchi via his wife Helene, to whom he was introduced through art expert Werner Spies, who had authenticated one of Beltracchi's paintings before they were sold on. Bouvier has denied any connection to Beltracchi and has dismissed media coverage as uninformed speculation.

==== IFAS tax investigation in China ====
On 30 March 2012, the Beijing office of one of Bouvier's subsidiary firms, art transporter IFAS, was raided by local tax authorities, leading to the arrest of several employees, including the general manager Nils Jennrich. Through his lawyer, Bouvier contested having affiliation with the company. With the efforts of German diplomats, Jennrich was released and returned to Germany in 2013, and the case was closed as well as the charges dropped.

==== Catherine Hutin-Blay ====
In September 2015, Bouvier was indicted on charges of concealed theft of two Picassos belonging to Catherine Hutin-Blay, step-daughter of Picasso, who claims that they were stolen from her collection. Bouvier countered this by showing that Hutin-Blay had received 8 million euros through a Liechtensteiner trust linked to their sale, leading to the case being dismissed in Liechtenstein in December 2015. However, in 2024, a French court reopened the case following new evidence. It suggested Bouvier had used questionable tactics to sell additional Picasso artworks without Hutin-Blay's consent. The court's decision highlighted suspicions about Bouvier's methods, which allegedly included misleading valuations and complex intermediary arrangements to obscure the true ownership and inflate the prices of artworks.

In January 2026, an investigating judge ruled that Yves Bouvier should stand trial before a criminal court in Paris on charges including handling stolen goods and money laundering. The decision followed the assessment that no verifiable documentation had been provided to support the lawful acquisition of the artworks in question. His associate Olivier Thomas was also referred to trial on related charges, including breach of trust. Bouvier has denied the allegations.

Bouvier and an associate, Marc Francelet, were also allegedly involved in helping former president of Angola, Jose Eduardo dos Santos, funnel Angolan state funds out of the country. According to Angolan press reports and French court documents, Bouvier and Francelet used two shell companies, Brave Ventures Pte Ltd and Francelet Consulting, to make the state funds disappear.

==== Panama Papers ====
In the 2015 leak, it was revealed that Bouvier had at least five offshore companies linked to him. A lawyer for Bouvier stated these are used for well-established legal purposes.

==== Alleged Swiss tax investigation ====
In 2017, the Swiss Federal Tax Administration (FTA) initiated an investigation into Bouvier for tax evasion to the tune of CHF 165 million ($145 million) stemming mostly from income received through art deals with Rybolovlev and proceeds from companies in Hong Kong and the Virgin Islands that are allegedly tied to him. In June 2019, the FTA was granted access to documents seized during office raids, following Bouvier's attempt of blocking them.

On 3 August 2020, Switzerland's Federal Criminal Court ruled that some of the documents in question must be inspected, which subsequently led the authorities to accuse Bouvier of owing taxes on CHF 330 million ($360 million). At the core of the case is Bouvier's assertion that he has been a Singapore resident for the past decade and thus does not owe Swiss taxes on profits made since then. However, the authorities dispute this, arguing that Bouvier continues to be domiciled and conducting business in Switzerland.

In 2024 he was ordered by a Swiss federal court to pay 730 million Swiss francs ($821 million) in unpaid taxes to the canton of Geneva for the years 2008 to 2015. The ruling found that Bouvier, despite claiming fiscal residence in Singapore, where he moved to 2009, spent most of the time in Geneva during the period in question.

In October 2026, ''Gotham City'' reported that Geneva tax authorities were also challenging Bouvier's claim that he was a tax resident of Singapore between 2016 and 2020. According to the report, a Geneva court decision dated 27 October 2025 supported the tax authorities' position that Bouvier had not sufficiently severed his personal and business ties to Geneva. The court also rejected his request to deduct CHF 33.5 million in legal fees related to his dispute with Dmitry Rybolovlev, as he had not provided invoices to support the claim. The amount of additional taxes claimed for 2016–2020 was not specified.

==== Scherbakov case ====
In 2018, another Russian businessman, who according to artnet news emerged to be Vladimir Shcherbakov filed a lawsuit against Yves Bouvier and his associate Thierry Hobaica, who according to media reports Bouvier had engaged to deal with Scherbakov. The Russian accused them of overcharging him in the purchase of 40 artworks, which were allegedly acquired through offshore firms owned by Bouvier.

==== Artworks held by Pascal de Sarthe ====
In 2025, Bouvier initiated legal proceedings in Hong Kong concerning approximately 91 artworks worth an estimated $100 million that he said had been placed in storage with art dealer Pascal de Sarthe. Bouvier claims that the works were not returned to him and has sought their recovery. De Sarthe disputes Bouvier's claim of ownership, arguing that the artworks belong to Jean-Marc Peretti. In 2026, Bouvier also sought documents from Sotheby's and other institutions in U.S. federal court in New York for use in the Hong Kong proceedings.

==== Antoine Peretti ====
In July 2026, Bouvier filed a criminal complaint in Paris against French art dealer Antoine Peretti, alleging that Peretti had withheld proceeds from the resale of a Picasso painting. According to the complaint, Bouvier purchased the work from Peretti for $7.25 million in April 2024 under an agreement to share profits from a subsequent sale. Bouvier alleges that the work was later resold through Sotheby's without his knowledge and that he did not receive his share of the proceeds. The filing of the complaint did not itself result in criminal charges against Peretti.

== Personal life ==
Bouvier is a non-practicing Protestant, and is passionate about skiing, sailing boats “of all kinds”, as well as competition horses.

He settled in Singapore in 2008 where he currently resides, which is being contested by Swiss tax authorities saying he is still a Geneva resident.

According to the French magazine Le Point, Yves Bouvier had allegedly been the patron of Zahia Dehar, a model and designer who had previously worked as a call girl. According to report, Bouvier allegedly organized dinners for his clients, with Dehar as the "guest star," while she was allegedly underage. She became known to the general public after being "offered" at the age of 17 as a birthday present to French footballer Frank Ribéry. The relationship between Yves Bouvier and Zahia Dehar caught the attention of the French press, but has been denied by both Bouvier and Dehar. A former escort colleague of Zahia, known as Sarah, claims that she and Zahia were part of an international pimping ring headed by Yves Bouvier.

== See also ==
- The Lost Leonardo, 2021 film in which Bouvier is interviewed
