= Modigliani (film) =

- Theatrical release poster
- Directed by: Mick Davis
- Written by: Mick Davis
- Produced by: Philippe Martinez; André Djaoui; Stéphanie Martinez
- Starring: Andy García; Elsa Zylberstein; Omid Djalili; Hippolyte Girardot; Eva Herzigova; Udo Kier; Susie Amy; Peter Capaldi
- Cinematography: Emmanuel Kadosh
- Edited by: Emma E. Hickox
- Music by: Guy Farley
- Distributed by: Bauer Martinez Studios
- Release date: 29 September 2004 (France)
- Running time: 128 minutes
- Countries: United States; France; Germany; Italy; Romania; United Kingdom
- Language: English
- Box office: $208,507 (US) $1,466,013 (worldwide theatrical)

Modigliani is a 2004 drama biographical film written and directed by Mick Davis and starring Andy García, Elsa Zylberstein, Omid Djalili, Hippolyte Girardot, Eva Herzigova and Udo Kier. It is based on the life of the Italian artist Amedeo Modigliani.

== Plot ==
Set in Paris in 1919, this biopic presents the life of Italian artist Amedeo Modigliani, centering, artistically, on his relationship to and rivalry with Pablo Picasso when they both lived in Paris. Modigliani, an Italian Jew from Livorno, has fallen in love with Jeanne Hébuterne, a young and beautiful French Catholic girl. The couple have a child, and Jeanne's bigoted father sends the baby to a faraway convent to be raised by nuns. Modigliani is distraught but needs money to rescue and raise his child. Paris' annual art competition is in the offing. Prize money and a guaranteed career await the winner.

Neither Modigliani nor his rival Picasso have ever entered the competition, believing that it is beneath true artists like themselves. But push comes to shove with the welfare of his child on the line, and the impoverished Modigliani signs up for the competition in a drunken and drug-induced act at the center of a café frequented by artists, including Picasso, who is, by Modigliani signing the roster for the competition, himself induced to sign.

All of Paris is aflutter with excitement at who will win. Modigliani tackles the work of his entry with the hopes of creating a masterpiece, and knows that all the artists of Paris are doing the same. Once completed, he calls his agent and dearest friend, Léopold Zborowski, personally to take the painting to the competition and to make sure no one touches it. While his friend is taking the painting, Modigliani is at City Hall waiting to finally obtain a marriage license. City Hall closes before he is called, but he manages to persuade the woman clerk who is shooing him out to have mercy and give him the license anyway because he has a beautiful daughter and another on the way—and because he is an artist, as is she! As the last person to leave, he decides to celebrate with one drink. Unfortunately his addiction, and his nervousness about the competition, make him drink many more.

The competition was going to start at eight o'clock, and when he realizes he is very late he finally rushes out, without paying. While drinking, he had been asked whether he had the money to pay, and he had answered that he had 5,000 francs (the prize money) and could buy everyone in the café a drink. Two guys that were in the bar follow him and assault and severely beat him, under the assumption that he has a lot of money. Once they find that he has no money they leave him in the snow, bloody and more than half dead.

His painting of Jeanne in a blue dress he had stolen from a shop window wins the competition, beating even Picasso's cubist portrait entitled Modigliani. Unaware of this victory, he somehow manages to make it home, where Jeanne washes the blood from his face. But then his artist friends come, realize that he needs to be in a hospital, and take him there over Jeanne's protests. He dies in hospital. Jeanne commits suicide by falling from a window. They are buried together, along with the unborn child.

== Cast ==
- Andy García as Amedeo Modigliani
- Elsa Zylberstein as Jeanne Hébuterne, Modigliani's chief love interest
- Omid Djalili as Pablo Picasso, Modigliani's rival
- Hippolyte Girardot as Maurice Utrillo
- Eva Herzigova as Olga Khokhlova, Picasso's wife
- Udo Kier as Max Jacob
- Susie Amy as Beatrice Hastings
- Peter Capaldi as Jean Cocteau
- Louis Hilyer as Léopold Zborowski
- Stevan Rimkus as Chaïm Soutine
- Dan Astileanu as Diego Rivera
- George Ivascu as Moise Kisling
- Michelle Newell as Eudoxie Hébuterne
- Frederico Ambrosino as Little Dedo
- Miriam Margolyes as Gertrude Stein
- Irina Dinescu as Paulette
- Theodor Danetti as Pierre-Auguste Renoir
- Ion Siminie as Claude Monet
- Jim Carter as Achilles Hébuterne
- Lance Henriksen as Foster Kane
- Loredana Groza as Singer
- Oana Zavoranu as Eugenia Modigliani
- Maria Rotaru as Berthe Weill (as Marina Rotaru)

== Production ==
Mick Davis wrote the film's script in the 1990s and sent it to Martin Scorsese. "Scorsese told me it's one of the best screenplays he's ever read and could turn into either a movie or a theatre performance", said Davis in an interview in 2014. Al Pacino and 20th Century Studios received the screenplay not long thereafter and were happy with it but suggested Davis combine the new version of the script with the early one. Pacino was considered to be the director at this point, with Johnny Depp playing the leading role of Modigliani. Davis, who was not satisfied with the idea of combining the two versions of the script, decided to make his version of the film.

== Release ==
Appearing at a number of film festivals in 2004 and 2005, Modigliani saw its world premiere at the Gala Selection of the Toronto International Film Festival. Also of particular note, it opened the Miami International Film Festival in 2005, and also played at the Bergen International Film Festival, the Washington Jewish Film Festival, The Capri Hollywood Film Festival, the Bangkok International Film Festival, The Mexico City International Contemporary Film Festival, Spain's Mostra de Valencia Cinema del Mediterranean, Italy's Festival Due Mondi, California's San Jose Jewish Film Festival, and the Sonoma Film Festival.

Making its French theatrical debut on 18 May 2004, later it opened in Russia, Belgium and Ukraine, as well as launching on video in Israel. In 2005, it opened in Dutch, Italian, Romanian, Swedish, Danish and Norwegian theatres—and on DVD in Thailand, Hong Kong, Brazil, Canada and Finland. In 2006 it opened in theatres in Poland, Portugal and Spain; on Argentine TV; and on DVD in Australia, The Czech Republic and New Zealand. In January 2007 it opened on Hungarian and Puerto Rican TV. In 2008 it debuted on DVD in Germany and Austria. As from 10 March 2008, the film has become available in the UK as a DVD rental.

Modigliani had a worldwide theatrical gross of $1,466,013: bringing in $1,260,848 in eight markets and doing $208,507 in the U.S. during 14 weeks in 2005, during which it only screened in 2–9 theatres. The top market for Modigliani was Italy, where it brought in $1,009,517 (69% of the global total).

== Reception ==
=== Critical response ===
The film was not well received by critics. On Rotten Tomatoes the film has an approval rating of 4% based on reviews from 24 critics. The website's critics consensus reads, "Nearly everyone is miscast in this disjointed and slow-moving portrait of Italian artist Amedeo Modigliani." On Metacritic the film has a score of 25% based on reviews from 10 critics.

New York Times critic Stephen Holden wrote, "The best and maybe the only use to be made of the catastrophic screen biography Modigliani is to serve as a textbook outline of how not to film the life of a legendary artist."

=== Awards ===
Modigliani was nominated for two International Press Academy Golden Satellite Awards: to Pam Downe for Costume Design and Luigi Marchione and Vlad Vieru for Art Direction and Production Design.

== Historical errors ==
The film contains many inaccuracies or omissions, including:

- The scene with the foreclosure (due to bankruptcy) with the furniture piled on the mother's bed, happened during Amedeo's birth (he was the last-born child).
- Modigliani met Jeanne in 1917, not in 1919.
- The alleged rivalry between him and Picasso has never been firmly proven.
- The only real painting that appears in the final competition is Soutine's Piece de Boeuf, realized later, in 1923; all the other works are fictional.
- Modigliani was great friends not only with Utrillo but also with Soutine, Rivera, Kisling, Foujita, Brâncuși, Chagall, and Souza Cardoso.
- Modigliani was also a sculptor.
- Leopold Zborowski was not only an art dealer but also a poet and writer.
- Modigliani and Jeanne dance in the streets to the notes of La vie en rose by Edith Piaf but the song was written in 1945.
- Modigliani met Renoir around 1918, without the help of Picasso.
- At the time Picasso was not a well established painter.
- Modigliani died of meningitis not of tuberculosis (which he also suffered from), nor was he beaten up in the streets.

== See also ==
- Montparnasse 19, 1958 film
- Modì, Three Days on the Wing of Madness, 2024 film
