= Montparnasse 19 =

Jacques Becker film

- Theatrical poster
- Directed by: Jacques Becker; Max Ophüls (uncredited)
- Screenplay by: Jacques Becker; Henri Jeanson
- Based on: The Lovers of Montparnasse by Michel-Georges Michel
- Produced by: Sandro Pallavicini
- Starring: Gérard Philipe; Lilli Palmer; Lino Ventura; Anouk Aimée
- Cinematography: Christian Matras
- Edited by: Marguerite Renoir
- Music by: Paul Misraki
- Distributed by: Cocinor
- Release date: 4 April 1958
- Running time: 108 minutes
- Countries: France; Italy; West Germany
- Language: French
- Box office: 1,297,340 admissions (France)

Montparnasse 19 (French: Les Amants de Montparnasse, lit. 'The Lovers of Montparnasse') is a 1958 French-Italian drama film directed and co-written by Jacques Becker, partially based on the last years of the life of Italian artist Amedeo Modigliani, who worked and died in abject poverty in the Montparnasse area of Paris. Some of his most famous paintings done then were of his last two lovers, Beatrice Hastings and Jeanne Hébuterne.

== Plot ==
Leading a bohemian existence In Paris is the artist Modigliani, known as Modi. Spending much of his time drinking and sleeping with the attractive writer Beatrice, he does some drawing and painting but sells virtually nothing. He meets a beautiful young art student called Jeanne, who is locked up by her family to keep her away from him. His friends the Zborowskis do their best to keep him afloat, but his fragile health, weakened by constant alcohol and tobacco, gives out and he is sent to Nice to recuperate. Jeanne escapes and joins him there, after which the two are inseparable.

Returning to Paris, the Zborowskis arrange a one-man show in the prestigious gallery of Madame Weill, where everybody turns up for free drinks at the opening but nobody buys. After complaints, the police order the removal of a nude from the window. A cynical dealer called Morel explains that Modi is sure to die soon and that is when people will pay for his works. The Zborowskis find an American millionnaire who is genuinely interested in some of Modi's canvasses (which would later become world-famous) but when he says he would then use the blue eyes of Jeanne to advertise his products, Modi walks out in disgust.

Despondent at his inability to combine the quest for beauty in his paintings of Beatrice and Jeanne with any commercial reality, and with his health increasingly feeble, he goes round cafés trying without success to sell his drawings. Collapsing in the street, he is taken to hospital where he dies alone. Without telling her what has happened, Morel rushes round to a delighted Jeanne to buy up all unsold works for immediate cash.

== Cast ==
- Gérard Philipe as Amedeo Modigliani
- Lilli Palmer as Beatrice Hastings
- Lea Padovani as Rosalie
- Lino Ventura as Morel
- Gérard Séty as Léopold Zborowski
- Arlette Poirier as Lulu
- Anouk Aimée as Jeanne Hébuterne
- Lila Kedrova as Anna Zborowska
- Marianne Oswald as Berthe Weill
- François Perrot as The internal (uncredited)
- Stéphane Audran as a girl (uncredited)

== Production ==
The film was originally to be directed by Max Ophüls, but while preparing the project, he died of rheumatic heart disease. The production was completed by his friend Jacques Becker, and the film was dedicated to Ophüls.

There are at least two versions of the film; the longer version is about two hours long and has more scenes featuring the character of Léopold Zborowski.

== See also ==
- Modigliani, 2004 film
- Modì, Three Days on the Wing of Madness, 2024 film
