= Modì, Three Days on the Wing of Madness =

2024 film by Johnny Depp

- Official release poster
- Directed by: Johnny Depp
- Screenplay by: Jerzy Kromolowski; Mary Kromolowski
- Based on: Modigliani by Dennis McIntyre
- Produced by: Johnny Depp; Al Pacino; Barry Navidi; Andrea Iervolino; Monika Bacardi
- Starring: Riccardo Scamarcio; Antonia Desplat; Bruno Gouery; Ryan McParland; Stephen Graham; Luisa Ranieri; Al Pacino
- Cinematography: Dariusz Wolski; Nicola Pecorini
- Edited by: Mark Davies
- Music by: Sacha Puttnam; Steve McLaughlin
- Production companies: IN.2 Film; Westman Films; Barry Navidi Productions; ILBE Group; Red Sea Film Foundation
- Distributed by: Be Water (Italy)
- Release dates: 24 September 2024 (San Sebastián); 26 October 2024 (Rome Film Festival); 21 November 2024 (Italy); 11 July 2025 (United Kingdom)
- Running time: 108 minutes
- Countries: United Kingdom; Hungary; Italy
- Languages: English; Italian
- Box office: $510,613

Modì, Three Days on the Wing of Madness (Italian: Modì – Tre giorni sulle ali della follia) is a 2024 biographical drama film based on the life of Italian artist Amedeo Modigliani. It is directed by Johnny Depp from a screenplay by Jerzy and Mary Kromolowski, which is based on the play Modigliani by Dennis McIntyre.

Produced by Depp's IN.2 Film, Salome Productions, Barry Navidi Productions, and Proton Cinema, it is a co-production between the United Kingdom, Hungary and Italy. It stars Riccardo Scamarcio in the leading role, with Stephen Graham, Al Pacino and Antonia Desplat in supporting roles. The artist's life story, which was previously adapted for Montparnasse 19 (1958) and Modigliani (2004), is Depp's second directorial effort, following The Brave (1997).

Modì, Three Days on the Wing of Madness premiered at the 72nd San Sebastián International Film Festival on 24 September 2024. The film was awarded Cult Movie of the Year at the 29th Capri Hollywood Roma Fall Gala, the day before it premiered in Italy at the 19th Rome Film Festival on 26 October 2024. The film was released in theatres in Italy on 21 November 2024.

== Plot ==
The film spans seventy-two hours in the life of Bohemian Italian artist Amedeo Modigliani, known to his friends as Modì, who frequented the streets of war-torn Paris in 1916. On the run from the police, his desire to end his career and leave the city is dismissed by his fellow Bohemians: French artist Maurice Utrillo, the Belarusian-born Chaïm Soutine and English muse Beatrice Hastings. Modì seeks advice from his Polish art dealer and friend Léopold Zborowski. However, after a night of hallucinations, the chaos in Modì's mind reaches a crescendo when faced with American collector Maurice Gangnat, who has the power to change his life.

== Cast ==
- Riccardo Scamarcio as Amedeo Modigliani
- Stephen Graham as Léopold Zborowski
- Al Pacino as Maurice Gangnat
- Antonia Desplat as Beatrice Hastings
- Bruno Gouery as Maurice Utrillo
- Ryan McParland as Chaïm Soutine
- Luisa Ranieri as Rosalie Tobia
- Sally Phillips as Clementine, the general's wife
- Benjamin Lavernhe as Monsieur Petit
- Viorica Manole as singer
- Ionita Manole as singer

== Production ==
=== Development ===
In the late 1970s, Al Pacino first had the idea to make a biopic about Amedeo Modigliani based on the play Modigliani by Dennis McIntyre. American film producer Keith Barish bought the rights to the play and gave Pacino full creative control. Pacino flew Richard Price to Paris to start writing the script, using the play as the basis for the film. Initially, in 1979, the script was given to American filmmaker Francis Ford Coppola to direct, with Bernardo Bertolucci and Martin Scorsese as Pacino's second and third choices, respectively. After being turned down by Coppola, Pacino presented the script to Scorsese, who was impressed by it. The two men, however, found great difficulty producing the film in the 1980s due to studios not wanting to finance it.

Mick Davis wrote a script for Modigliani in the 1990s and sent it to Scorsese. "Martin Scorsese told me it's one of the best screenplays he's ever read and could turn into either a movie or a theatre performance," said Davis in a 2014 interview. Al Pacino and 20th Century Studios received the screenplay not long thereafter and were happy with it, but suggested that Davis combine the new version of the script with the earlier one.

Pacino was considered as director at this point, with Johnny Depp playing the leading role of Modigliani. Pacino first proposed the idea of doing a film about Modigliani to Depp while they were shooting Donnie Brasco in 1997. Davis, who was not satisfied with the idea of combining the two versions of the script, decided to make his version of the film in 2004, starring Andy García as the artist.

In 2012, Barry Navidi and Al Pacino discussed the project with the idea of Depp in the role of Modigliani. However, Depp's busy schedule prevented it from happening. Pacino asked Depp to direct the film before the COVID-19 pandemic began in 2020.

=== Pre-production ===
In August 2022, it was officially announced that Depp would direct and produce Modigliani, with Al Pacino and Barry Navidi producing. The film is based on a play by Dennis McIntyre, and adapted for the screen by Jerzy and Mary Kromolowski. It is Depp's first directorial effort since The Brave, released in 1997 (in which he starred with Marlon Brando).

It is also Depp's third collaboration with Al Pacino, the two others being Donnie Brasco and Jack and Jill. Depp expressed his admiration of Modigliani: "The saga of Mr. Modigliani's life is one that I'm incredibly honored, and truly humbled, to bring to the screen. It was a life of great hardship, but eventual triumph — a universally human story all viewers can identify with." Pacino, who initially pitched the idea of directing the biopic to Depp, stated: "This is a slice of Modì's life and not a bio. It's been a dream of mine to work with Johnny again — he's a true artist with an amazing vision to bring this great story to the screen."

In May 2023, the film was announced to be titled Modì, and the first round of casting was announced. Riccardo Scamarcio and Pierre Niney were cast in the leading roles as Amedeo Modigliani and Maurice Utrillo, respectively, while Al Pacino was cast as Gangnat.

The film was sold for distribution during the 2023 Cannes Film Festival by the Veterans. In September 2023, Pierre Niney exited the film due to scheduling conflicts, while Luisa Ranieri, Antonia Desplat, Stephen Graham, Bruno Gouery, Ryan McParland, Benjamin Lavernhe and Sally Phillips joined the cast. On 11 October 2023, Romanian taraf singers Viorica and Ionita Manole announced on Instagram that they would appear in the film as singers, performing for Modigliani and his friends.

=== Filming ===
Principal photography commenced in September 2023, in Budapest, Hungary. Some scenes were shot near Károlyi Garden, where the streets were decorated to look like Paris in the 1910s. This prompted sightings of the cast and of Depp, and posts showing the location of the sets on Hungary's social-media networks. On 4 November 2023, filming wrapped in Budapest, with the cast and crew posting photos and celebrating on Instagram. A few days later, Depp took to Instagram to thank the cast and crew for their work on the project. In January 2024, the scenes in which Al Pacino are featured were shot in Los Angeles. Additional filming took place in Turin, Italy, on 20 and 21 February 2024.

=== Post-production ===
On 18 January 2024, after filming had wrapped in Los Angeles, the first images from the set were made available, along with a statement by Depp:

Embarking on this cinematic journey as the director of Modì has been an incredibly fulfilling and transformative experience. I would like to express my profound gratitude to the entire cast, crew, and producers for their unwavering commitment and creativity. To Al, who requested that I make this film—how could I refuse Pacino? A sincere acknowledgement for generously contributing his talent and dedication to this project. Modì is a testament to the collaborative spirit of independent filmmaking, and I am excited to present this unique and compelling story to the world.

— Johnny Depp, talking about his experience as the director of Modì, Entertainment Tonight

In August 2024, the film was given the subtitle Three Days on the Wing of Madness. The film is produced by Depp's IN.2 (a European sister company to his Los Angeles-based Infinitum Nihil), Salome Productions, Barry Navidi Productions and The Veterans, with local production in Budapest handled by Proton Cinema. Modì, Three Days on the Wing of Madness is dedicated to musician Jeff Beck, who was a close friend of Depp's.

=== Financing and budget ===
On 31 August 2023, it was announced that Modì would be financially backed by the Red Sea Film Foundation, which had also supported Maïwenn's Jeanne du Barry, in which Depp played a leading role.

== Release ==
The film premiered out of competition at the 72nd San Sebastián International Film Festival on 24 September 2024, where it was met with praise and a long standing-ovation by the audience. It premiered in Italy at the 19th Rome Film Festival on 26 October 2024 as the closing film, prior to being released in theatres in Italy by Be Water Film on 21 November 2024. The film also played at the 4th Red Sea International Film Festival on 12 December 2024. Vertical acquired the North American rights for a limited domestic run beginning on 7 November 2025.

== Soundtrack ==
The film soundtrack was compiled and curated by Johnny Depp. A 2LP set and CD Box was released on 17th July 2025 on Cadiz Music/In.2 Records, featuring tracks from Tom Waits, The Velvet Underground & Nico and British Brechtian Punk Cabaret trio, The Tiger Lillies, alongside dialogue from the film and original music composed by Sacha Puttnam and arranged by Steve McLaughlin.

== Reception ==
=== Critical response ===
On the review aggregator website Rotten Tomatoes, 44% of 18 critics' reviews are positive, with an average rating of 4.7/10. Metacritic, which uses a weighted average, assigned the film a score of 32 out of 100, based on 9 critics, indicating "generally unfavorable" reviews.

=== Box office ===
As of 16 September 2026, Modì, Three Days on the Wing of Madness grossed $510,613 in Italy, Russia, Lithuania, Spain, the United Kingdom, Colombia, and Turkey. In January 2026, it received a limited release in Japan.

=== Accolades ===
Year	Award	Category	Recipient(s)	Result	Ref.
2024	Capri Hollywood International Film Festival	Capri Cult Award	Modì, Three Days on the Wing of Madness	Won	
