= Little Peasant =

Little Peasant may refer to:

- The Little Peasant, a fairy tale collected by the Brothers Grimm.
- The Little Peasant, a painting by Amedeo Modigliani.
