= Rosalia Tobia =

Italian model and cook (1860–1932)

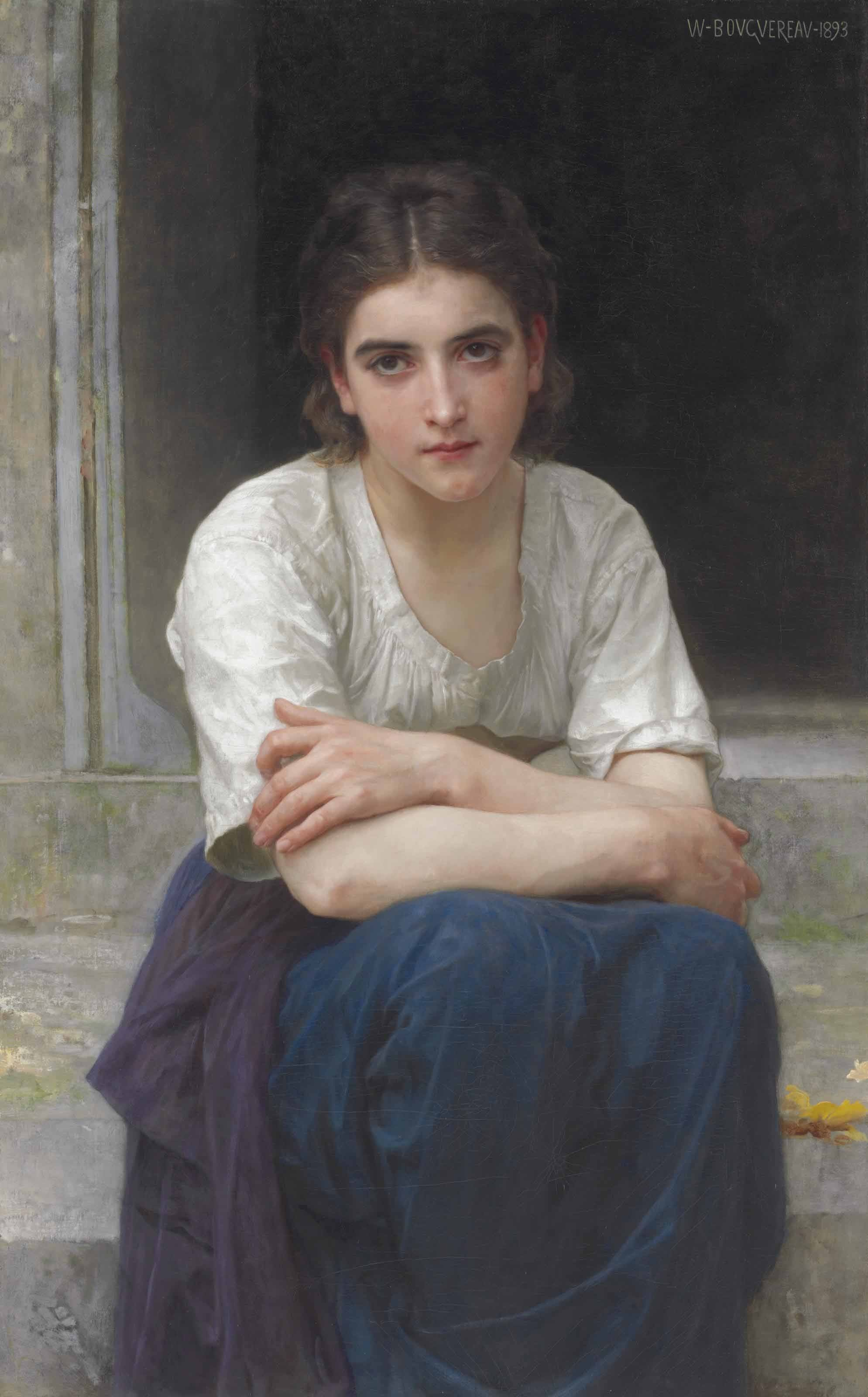
- Rosalia Tobia in the painting Rêverie sur le Seuil by William-Adolphe Bouguereau (1893).
- Born: 1860; Picinisco, Kingdom of the Two Sicilies
- Died: 1932 (aged 71–72); Cagnes-sur-Mer, France

Rosalia Tobia (Picinisco, 1860 – Cagnes-sur-Mer, 1932), known as Rosalie, was an Italian model and cook active in France.

She is best known as the founder of the restaurant Chez Rosalie, which became a meeting place for the artists of Montparnasse from the 1910s to the late 1920s.

== Biography ==
Originally from the Ciociaria area, Rosalia Tobia was born in Picinisco in 1860. In 1887 she arrived in Paris as a maid in the service of Princess Ruspoli. That same year she married and had a son, Luigi (known in French as Louis). In the French capital she first worked with Odilon Redon, and later began her career as an artist's model for the academic painter William-Adolphe Bouguereau, posing for works such as Jeunesse, Les deux baigneuses, Rêverie sur le seuil, and Les agneaux. She subsequently posed for Carolus-Duran and James Abbott McNeill Whistler as well.

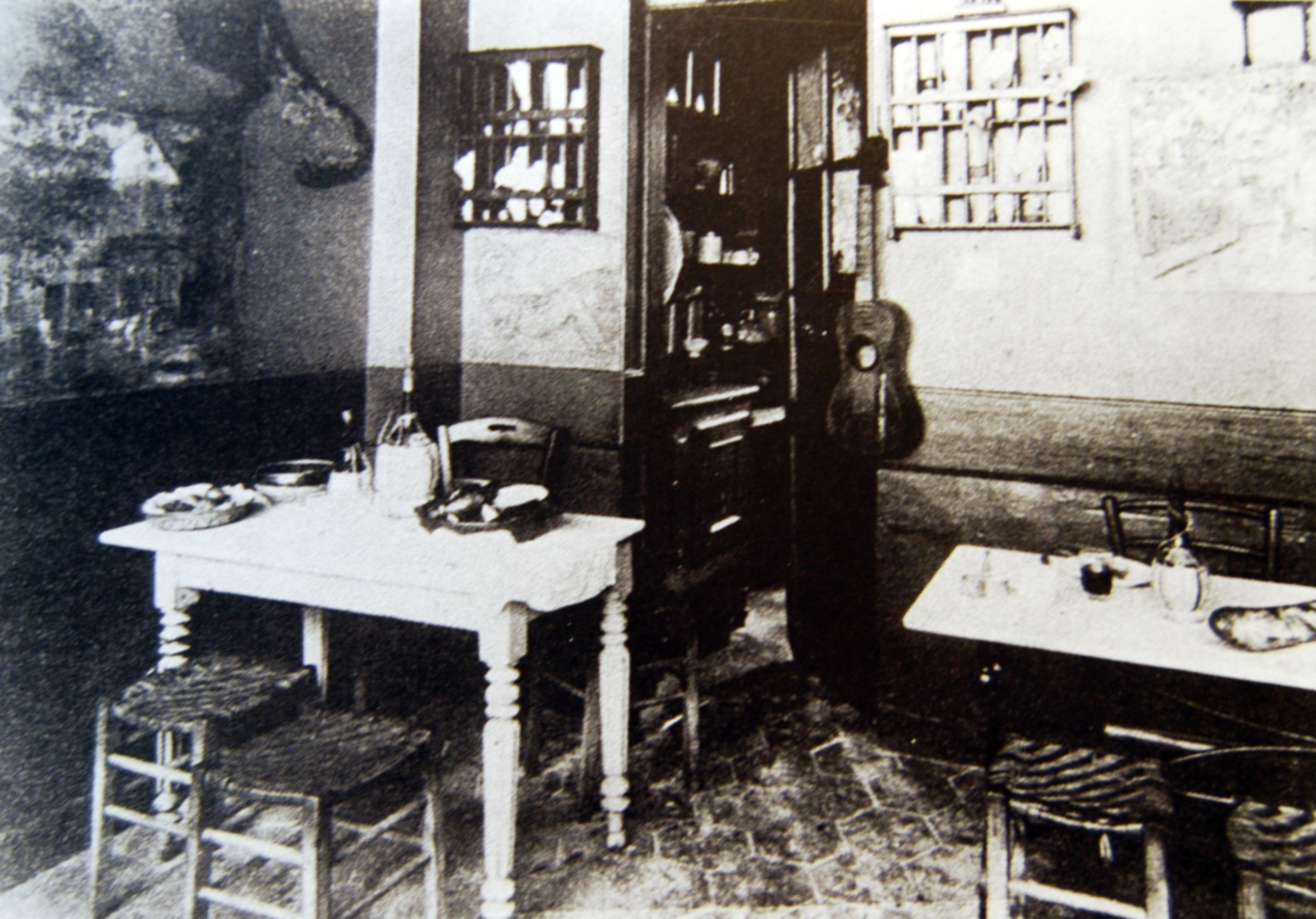
The interior of Chez Rosalie in a photograph from 1918–1919.

Sometime between 1906 and 1912, having left her career as an artist's model, Rosalia opened a restaurant in Montparnasse, Chez Rosalie. This small bistro, located in rue Campagne-Première, served traditional Italian food and was frequented mainly by the construction workers employed on the nearby building sites, at a time when Paris was beginning to expand rapidly. She was assisted in running the establishment by her son Luigi.

During those years another Italian settled in the artists' quarter of Montparnasse: the Livorno‑born Amedeo Modigliani. Modigliani began to frequent Rosalia Tobia's establishment regularly, often giving her some of his drawings when he did not have enough money to pay for a meal. Rosalia, however, was unable to appreciate Modigliani's modernist art, which was very different from the academic style she had known in her youth. It is believed that many of these "scribbles" (as she called them) were used to light the kitchen stoves or were stored in a cellar, where they were gnawed by mice.

When Modigliani began his relationship with Jeanne Hébuterne, the couple moved to an area close to Rosalia's establishment, with which they had developed a friendly relationship. Other regular patrons included the painters Maurice Utrillo, Pablo Picasso, and Jules Pascin, as well as the model Alice Prin, better known as Kiki de Montparnasse.

Between 1929 and 1930 Rosalia closed her restaurant and moved to the south of France, near Cannes, to a rural area that reminded her of her native homeland. She died two years later, in 1932, in Cagnes‑sur‑Mer, where she was also buried.

== Bibliography ==
- Michelle Deroyer, "Rosalie de Montparnasse" su La Semaine à Paris, 13 gennaio 1933, pp. 7-8.

== Other projects ==
Media related to Rosalia Tobia at Wikimedia Commons
