= Family Pack =

Family Pack may refer to:

- Family Pack (2000 film), a French-Belgian drama film directed by Chris Vander Stappen
- Family Pack (2022 film), an Indian comedy film directed by Arjun Kumar S.
- Family Pack (2024 film), a French adventure fantasy comedy film directed by François Uzan
