= André Hébuterne =

French painter (1894–1992)

André Hébuterne (3 September 1894 – 30 June 1992 in Paris) was a French painter.

== Early life ==
Born in Meaux, in the Seine-et-Marne département of France, Hébuterne moved with his family to Paris, where as a young man he began to pursue a career in art. He introduced his younger sister, Jeanne (1898–1920) to the artistic community in the Montparnasse Quarter, where she eventually became the partner of Modigliani. Following his sister's suicide, and the death of their parents, Hébuterne was given legal possession of Jeanne's personal papers and artwork. Her drawings and paintings were kept private until his widow allowed public access to them.

== Career ==
Hébuterne had limited success as an artist but made etchings that appeared in a 1948 reprint of a Gargantua book based on the François Rabelais creation.
