= The Match (1999 film) =

1999 film by Mick Davis

- Directed by: Mick Davis
- Written by: Mick Davis
- Produced by: Guymon Casady; Allan Scott
- Starring: Max Beesley; Isla Blair; Laura Fraser; Richard E. Grant
- Cinematography: Witold Stok
- Edited by: Kate Williams
- Music by: Harry Gregson-Williams
- Production company: PolyGram Filmed Entertainment
- Distributed by: Universal Pictures (through United International Pictures)
- Release date: 13 August 1999 (UK)
- Running time: 95 minutes
- Country: United Kingdom
- Language: English

The Match (also titled The Beautiful Game) is a 1999 British romantic comedy film written and directed by Mick Davis.

== Plot summary ==
In the Scottish village of Inverdoune, teams representing the village's two pubs—Benny's Bar and Le Bistro—have played an annual football game for 99 consecutive years. Under the terms of the original bet, the loser of the 100th match must forfeit their bar to the winner. Facing its 100th consecutive loss, Benny's Bar looks set to be bulldozed and replaced with a car park by the odious owner of Le Bistro, "Gorgeous" George Gus (Richard E. Grant). Local boy Wullie Smith (Max Beesley) returns from university, where he stays at the home of Sheila Bailey, re-igniting his dormant feelings for her daughter Rosemary (Laura Fraser). Wullie possesses TFR (Total Football Recall)—an encyclopedic recollection of football tactics and statistics—and would be an ideal manager for the Benny's Bar team, but he is traumatised by the death of his brother during their childhood and refuses. Also unwilling to help the team is a resident former professional football player (Neil Morrissey), known as "Piss-Off" due to his response whenever he is asked to play.

== Cast ==
- Max Beesley as Wullie Smith
- Isla Blair as Sheila Bailey
- James Cosmo as Billy Bailey
- Laura Fraser as Rosemary Bailey
- Richard E. Grant as Gorgeous Gus
- David Hayman as Scrapper
- Ian Holm as "Big Tam"
- Neil Morrissey as "Piss-Off"
- Tom Sizemore as "Buffalo"
- Samantha Fox as Patsy
- Billy Anderson as Pub regular

== Production ==
The Match was filmed in the Scottish village of Straiton in South Ayrshire.

One of the film's production companies was Irish DreamTime, owned by actor Pierce Brosnan who appears in a cameo role in the film as John MacGhee. Footballer Alan Shearer also makes a cameo appearance.
