= Beatrice Hastings in Front of a Door =

1915 painting by Amedeo Modigliani

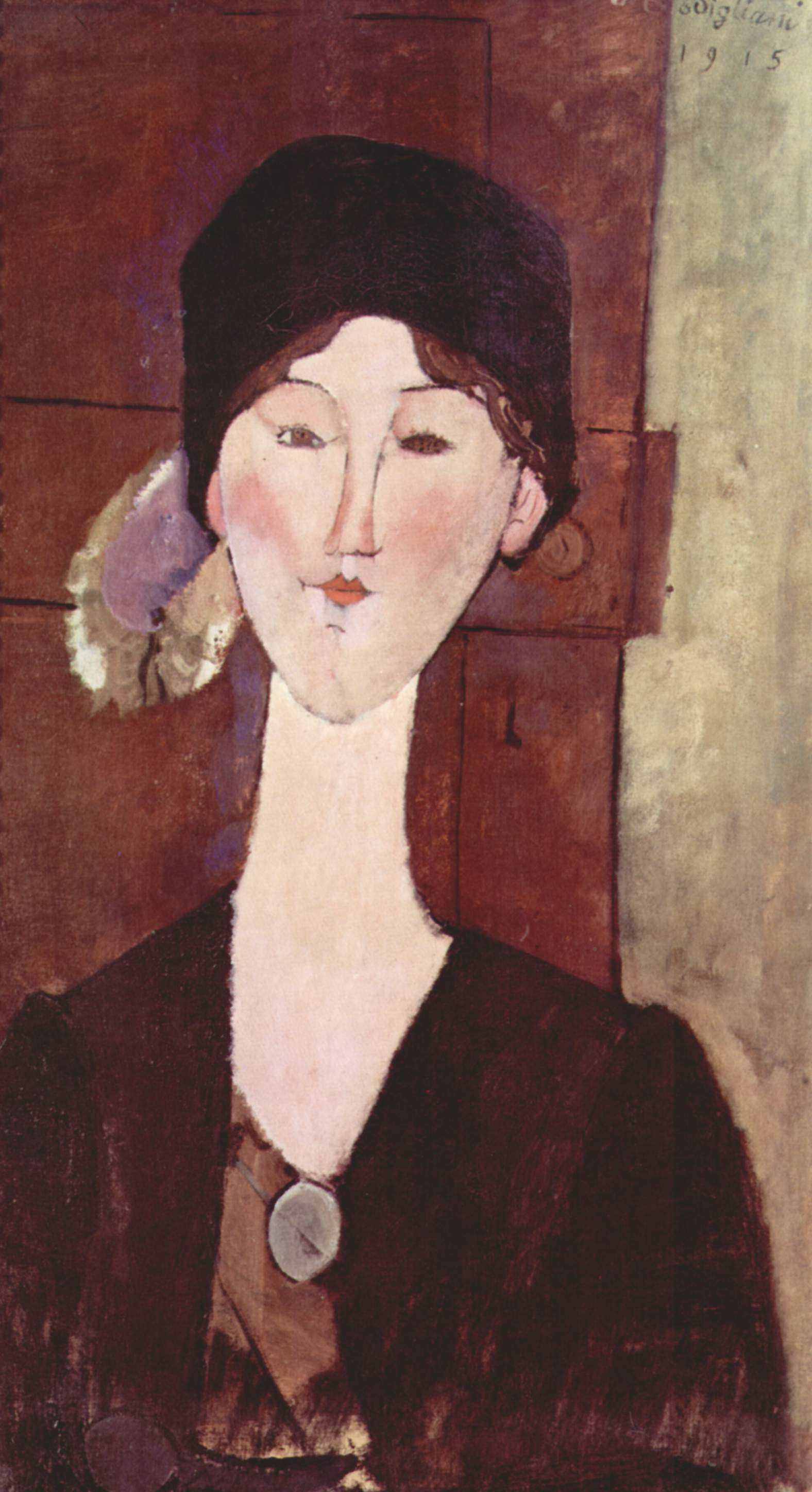
- Artist: Amedeo Modigliani
- Year: 1915
- Type: Oil paint on canvas
- Dimensions: 32 by 18.25 inches (81.3 cm × 46.4 cm)
- Location: Private collection

Beatrice Hastings in Front of a Door (French: Beatrice Hastings devant une porte) is an oil on canvas painting by Italian painter Amedeo Modigliani, from 1915. It depicts his then lover, the English writer Beatrice Hastings. It is one of 14 portraits Modigliani painted of Hastings. In 2002 the painting was sold at auction for $4.2 million to a private collector.
