= Family Pack (2024 film) =

French adventure comedy film

- Release poster
- French: Loups-garous
- Directed by: François Uzan
- Written by: Hervé Marly; Philippe des Pallières
- Based on: The Werewolves of Millers Hollow by: Philippe des Pallières; and Hervé Marly
- Produced by: Matthieu Warter; Clement Miserez
- Starring: Franck Dubosc; Jean Reno; Suzanne Clément; Grégory Fitoussi; Bruno Gouery
- Music by: Guillaume Roussel
- Production company: Radar Films
- Distributed by: Netflix
- Release date: 23 October 2024
- Country: France
- Language: French

Family Pack (French: Loups-garous) is a 2024 French adventure fantasy comedy film directed by François Uzan and written by Hervé Marly and Philippe des Pallières. It is an adaptation of the French card game The Werewolves of Millers Hollow published by Asmodee.

Family Pack was released on Netflix on 23 October 2024.

== Plot ==
In 2024, Jérôme Vassier visits his father Gilbert, who has Alzheimer's, accompanied by his wife Marie, their daughter Louise, his daughter Clara from a previous union, and Théo, Marie’s son from a previous marriage. Jérôme tries to get his family to play "Werewolves," a game supposedly invented by Gilbert, but after everyone refuses, Jérôme puts it away, and an earthquake occurs.

Once the phenomenon ends, the family realizes that the house is no longer the same, and Clara has disappeared. Searching for her, the Vassiers head to the village, where they notice other changes that they initially think are related to the medieval festival happening at the same time. There, believing they are witnessing a staged event, they become witnesses to the actual public execution of a shepherd accused of being a werewolf by the village captain, as several villagers have been killed by these beasts over the past few nights. Shocked, the Vassiers understand that they have been teleported to 1497 through the game, and they realised that the only way to end the game is to kill the four werewolves.

They are first confronted by the captain and his men because they are occupying the house of Childéric, an ancestor of the Vassiers who is suspected of witchcraft. The Vassiers manage to escape, thanks to Jérôme, who claims they are a troupe of artists, under the name "Daniel Baladin and the Baladettes." As a music teacher, he proves his point by singing 'Mon fils ma bataille' while accompanying himself on the lute. Furthermore, they find Clara, who turns out to be invisible and mute, linked to her role in the game: she is the "little girl," able to spy without being seen. Only her father can hear her thoughts due to his telepathic ability as a "seer."

That night, the werewolves prowl near the house, and Louise turns out to be one of them. By day, the little girl returns to normal. The Vassiers gradually realize that each family member has a role inherited from the game. Gilbert, the "hunter," is strong and can fight the werewolves, while Théo, the "thief," can transform into anyone by using an object of theirs. Only Marie appears to have no powers and is simply a regular villager. Since Louise is a werewolf, everyone hopes that killing the other three will spare the little girl.

The family attempts to question Childéric, who is imprisoned awaiting execution, but their ancestor only tells them that the werewolves appeared after a "man wearing the skin of a wolf" left the village. Not knowing how to find the remaining three monsters, the Vassiers accidentally encounter Childéric's neighbor, Piero, an Italian artist and scholar who helps make Clara visible with a rubber paste of his invention. Back in the village, a peasant woman, about to be executed, transforms into a werewolf but is shot dead. The werewolf game token then appeared on the dead werewolf's hand. While saving her father from the werewolves, Clara roughly identifies the last two: a woman with whitened hands and a stout man who limps.

The family decides to use Louise's sense of smell to track down the remaining creatures in the daytime. The stout man is killed by Gilbert, but Marie, a lawyer by profession, is imprisoned for witchcraft after trying to defend a woman who was experiencing domestic violence.

The following day, when Childéric and Marie are about to be burned alive in the village square, Jérôme distracts the crowd by singing 'Allumer le feu', while the others free them. After leaving the village, Piero advises them to seek refuge in a church where they can escape through a secret tunnel. Once inside the building, however, they cannot find the tunnel, and the last werewolf arrives, shortly followed by the captain, who reveals himself to be "Cupid." It turns out that the werewolf is his wife, and if she is killed, he will also die. Despite the combined powers of the Vassier family, the monster is too strong, even with the help of Louise, who, once again transformed into a werewolf, initially tries to attack them but later joins them when Jérôme and Marie start singing 'J'irai où tu iras', causing her to remember her relationship with her parents despite her state. In her battle against the werewolf, Louise dies, and her werewolf game token appears on her palm.

It is then that Marie reveals herself to be the "witch," who has the power to resurrect a player by killing another. She kills the werewolf while bringing her daughter back to life. Since the Vassiers managed to eliminate all four werewolves to receive their game tokens, the Vassiers are able to return to their time by putting all the tokens back in the game box and closing it. Before the transfer, Piero, who had previously declared his homosexuality, tells Jérôme that he has become his source of inspiration and that he wishes to return to Florence to resume painting under his true name: "Leonardo Piero da Vinci." Jérôme then asks Childéric to buy all of Piero's paintings.

Back in the present, Jérôme finds himself in possession of letters that his father wrote at night: the game had interrupted his illness, and he was in full control of his faculties. Knowing that his memory would soon fail again after they won, he had taken the opportunity to write how much he loved his son and partially transcribe his memories. Later, the family visits the Louvre, where the Mona Lisa now bears Jérôme's features and had a plaque stating that it was donated by the Vassier family.

== Cast ==
- Franck Dubosc as Jérôme Vassier
- Jean Reno as Gilbert Vassier
- Suzanne Clément as Marie Vassier
- Grégory Fitoussi as the Captain
- Bruno Gouery as Piero
- Jonathan Lambert as Childéric
- Lisa Do Couto as Clara
- Raphaël Romand as Théo
- Alizée Caugnies as Louise
- Klez Brandar as suspicious man
- David Salles as the executioner
- Jaroslav Vundrle as the blacksmith

== Production ==
The film is based on the game Werewolves of Millers Hollow created by Philippe des Pallières and Hervé Marly and published by Asmodee Group. The film is directed by Francis Uzan from a screenplay by Hervé Marly and Philippe des Pallières. The cast is led by Jean Reno, alongside Franck Dubosc, Suzanne Clément, Gregory Fitoussi and Bruno Gouery.

Principal photography took place in Prague in the summer of 2023, using a medieval set originally created for the television series Knightfall. The film also used Czech locations including Drevníky, Zduchovice, and Výsluní u Chomutova, shooting under its French title Les Loups Garous de Thiercelieux.

== Release ==
It was released worldwide on Netflix on 23 October 2024.

== Critical reception ==
Phil Hoad in The Guardian awarded it three stars, calling it a "rather sweet" and "well-packaged, undemanding fun" film which "has a good degree of Bill & Ted-style sport with olden times".
