= Jeanne Modigliani =

Italian essayist

Jeanne Modigliani (born Giovanna Hébuterne, 29 November 1918 – 27 July 1984) was an Italian-French historian of Jewish art mostly known for her biographical research on her father, School of Paris artist Amedeo Modigliani. In 1958 she wrote the book Modigliani: Man and Myth, later translated into English from the Italian by Esther Rowland Clifford.

== Early life ==
Jeanne Modigliani was born in Nice. Jeanne's father, Amedeo Modigliani, was an Italian Jewish artist who worked mainly in France. Primarily a figurative artist, he became known for paintings and sculptures in a modern style characterised by mask-like faces (without eyes) and elongation of form. He died in 1920 of tubercular meningitis, exacerbated by poverty, overwork, and addiction to alcohol and narcotics.

Her mother, Jeanne Hébuterne, was a French artist, best known as Amedeo Modigliani's frequent subject and common-law wife. When Modigliani died, on 24 January 1920, the twenty-one-year-old Hébuterne was eight months pregnant with their second child. A day after Modigliani's death, Hébuterne was taken to her parents' home. There, inconsolable, deeply depressed, eight months pregnant, and in despair, she threw herself out of a fifth-floor window, killing herself and her unborn second child. Her daughter, Jeanne, who was named after her, was only 14 months old.

After her parents' deaths the fourteen-month-old orphan Jeanne was brought to Italy and raised by her paternal grandparents and by her paternal aunt, who adopted her, in the Modigliani hometown of Livorno, where she spent her childhood. She then graduated in art history in Florence.

== World War II ==
Jeanne first married the Italian Jewish economist and journalist Mario Cesare Silvio Levi (born 1905), brother of the more famous Natalia Ginzburg. She later was identified and persecuted as a Jew by the fascists, fleeing to Paris. During World War II, she participated in the French Resistance. During this time she met another Resistance fighter, Valdemar "Valdi" Nechtschein (his nom de guerre was Victor Leduc), who was also married. They began an affair, and in May 1946, Jeanne gave birth to their daughter, Anne. Eventually, both divorced their spouses and married one another. Their second daughter together, Laure, was born in 1951.

== Later life ==
Jeanne married Mario Levi during the Second World War allegedly to assist Levi's legal residency in France, they divorced shortly afterwards. Jeanne and Valdemar Nechtschein divorced in 1980.

Following a fall that caused a cerebral hemorrhage, Jeanne died in a Paris hospital in 1984.
