= The Little Peasant (Modigliani) =

Painting by Amedeo Modigliani

- it: Il contadinello
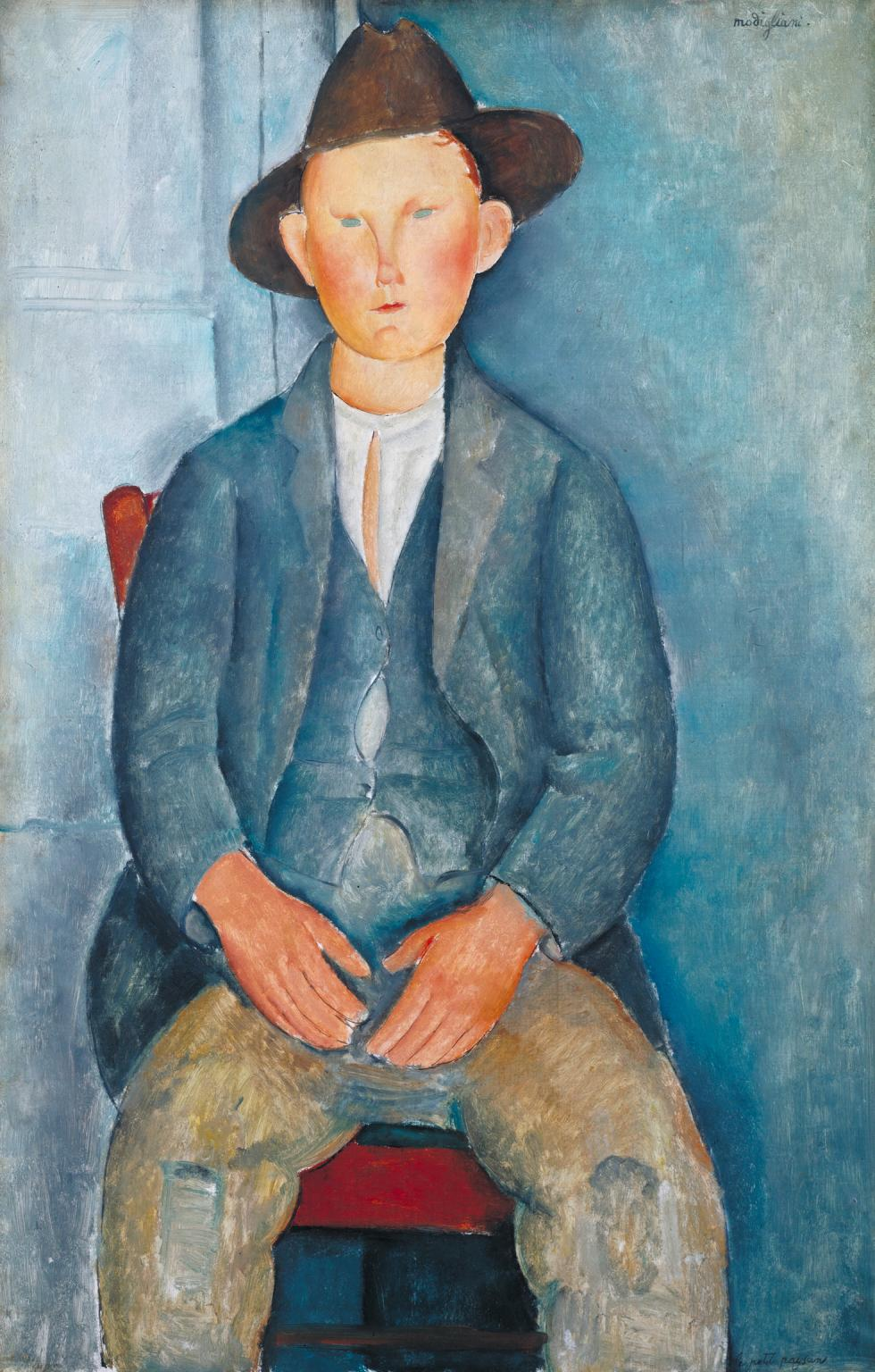
- Artist: Amedeo Modigliani
- Year: c. 1918
- Medium: Oil painting
- Dimensions: 100·65
- Location: Tate Modern, London

The Little Peasant is a 1918 oil painting of a youth by Amedeo Modigliani. It is held in Tate Modern, in London. The painting has a faint chromatism, a delicate color variation and harmony.

It was painted in Nice, based on a room where Modigliani also painted Jeanne Hébuterne.

== History and description ==
Modigliani went to the south of France in April or May 1918 and seems to have stayed there at least until July of the same year. He lived in Cagnes-sur-Mer, and from there in Nice. He returned to Paris on 31 May 1919. Joseph Lanthemann, in 1976, suggested that The Young Peasant was created in Nice, based on the fact that it shows the same room as other works by Modigliani depicting Jeanne Hébuterne, who are believed to have painted there. It seems to have been created, in any case, during his stay in the south of France, and can be considered a testimony of the Cézanne inspired period that the artist was going through. Although Lanthemann dates the painting to 1919, it misses the extreme stylization and elongation that characterizes Modigliani's later work and therefore seems more likely to have been painted in 1918.

The artist inscribed the title of the work on the lower right of the canvas, identifying the man seated on the chair as the 'peasant boy'. However, the same model appears in another painting, The Young Apprentice. Modigliani had been very influenced by Post-Impressionist Paul Cézanne, and it seems likely that the current painting was inspired by a Cézanne's series of paintings depicting workers in the fields, predominantly in blue tones.

In the portrait, the faint chromaticism of the face of the sitter, despite its delicacy in the tonal variations, manages to prevail and then be suppressed by the force of the background, an effect deliberately studied for the creation of harmony.
