= Bruno Gouery =

French actor

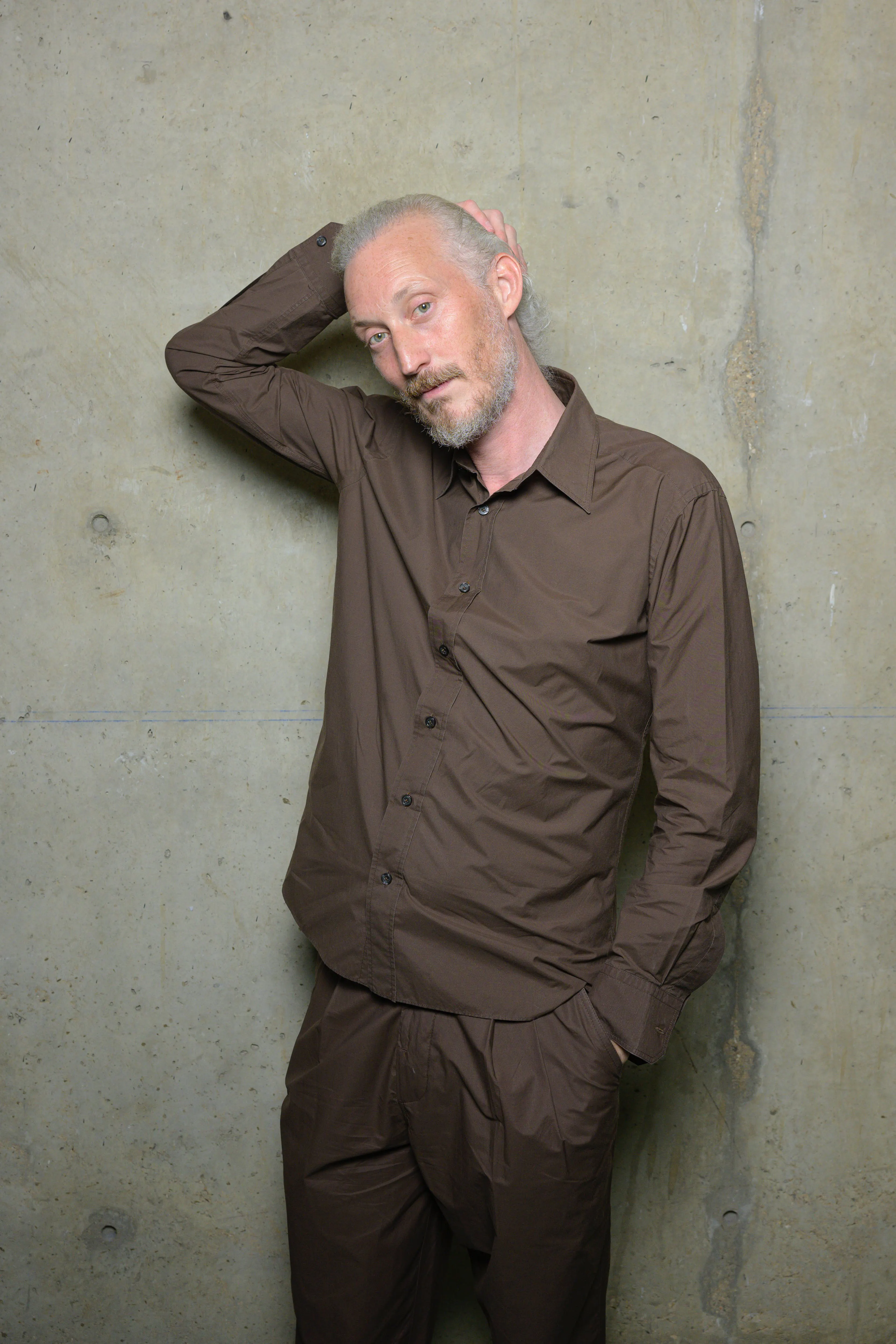
- Gouery in 2023
- Born: 11 July 1975 (age 51); France
- Occupation: Actor

Bruno Gouery (born 11 July 1975) is a French actor and writer who plays the role of Luc in the television series Emily in Paris. He also received significant attention for his role in The White Lotus season two. Gouery and the rest of the cast of The White Lotus won the award for Outstanding Performance by an Ensemble in a Drama Series in the 2023 Screen Actors Guild Awards.

== Career ==
Gouery has had several major roles in French television. He featured in the French adaptation of the British show Doc Martin. He also had a main role in the French police drama Double Je and the lead role in Alphonse Président. Gouery will play a main part in the upcoming French feature film Zénithal.

He also has a successful Italian acting career. His mother is Italian, and he is a native speaker. This helped him establish an acting career in Italy in various movies with outstanding directors like Sergio Castellitto in A Bookshop in Paris, or Sydney Sibilia in Rose Island.

Gouery's acting has drawn praise from a Salon.com writer, who says that he is "lovable" and that he elevates Emily in Paris. It has also drawn praise from Jennifer Coolidge who said "He's a smart and insightful actor. He has a way of drawing attention to himself, and his acting is so subtle and genuine that you are absolutely smitten when you share a scene with him."

Bruno Gouery appeared in Johnny Depp's Modì, Three Days on the Wing of Madness (about Amedeo Modigliani), co-produced with Al Pacino, as Maurice Utrillo.

In addition to acting, Gouery has screenwriting credits from three episodes of Doc Martin.

== Filmography ==
=== Film ===
Year	Title	Role	Notes	Ref.
2014	Des lendemains qui chantent	Rédacteur en chef Nouvel Obs		
2017	Marie-Francine	Le bouquiniste		
2017	The New Adventures of Cinderella	Le pâtissier		
2018	The Truk	François		
2019	Losing It	Le professeur Gerando		
2019	Place des Victoires	Meneur groupe de parole		
2020	A Friendly Tale	Serveur restaurant		
2020	Zaï Zaï Zaï Zaï	Jean-Pierre Galibert		
2020	Rose Island	Council of Europe Secretary		
2021	A Bookshop in Paris	Cleptomane		
2022	Ténor	Enseignant compta		
2022	Fratè	César		
2023	Needing a Friend?	The robber		
2024	Modì, Three Days on the Wing of Madness	Maurice Utrillo		
2024	Family Pack	Piero		
2027	Cliffhanger	TBA	Post-production	

=== Television ===
Year	Title	Role	Notes	Ref.
2011–2015	Doc Martin	Romaric Groslay	26 episodes	
2015	Underground Time	Technicien de l'informatique	Television film	
2017–2019	President Alphonse	Julien	18 episodes	
2018	Captain Sharif	Josselin Gourvannec	Episode: "Festival mortel"	
2019	Super Jimmy	Brigadier Fred Jolin	8 episodes	
2019	Platane	Duo 1 (David)	2 episodes	
2020–present	Emily in Paris	Luc	40 episodes	
2022	The White Lotus	Didier	5 episodes	
