= Seated Nude (1916) =

1916 painting by Amedeo Modigliani

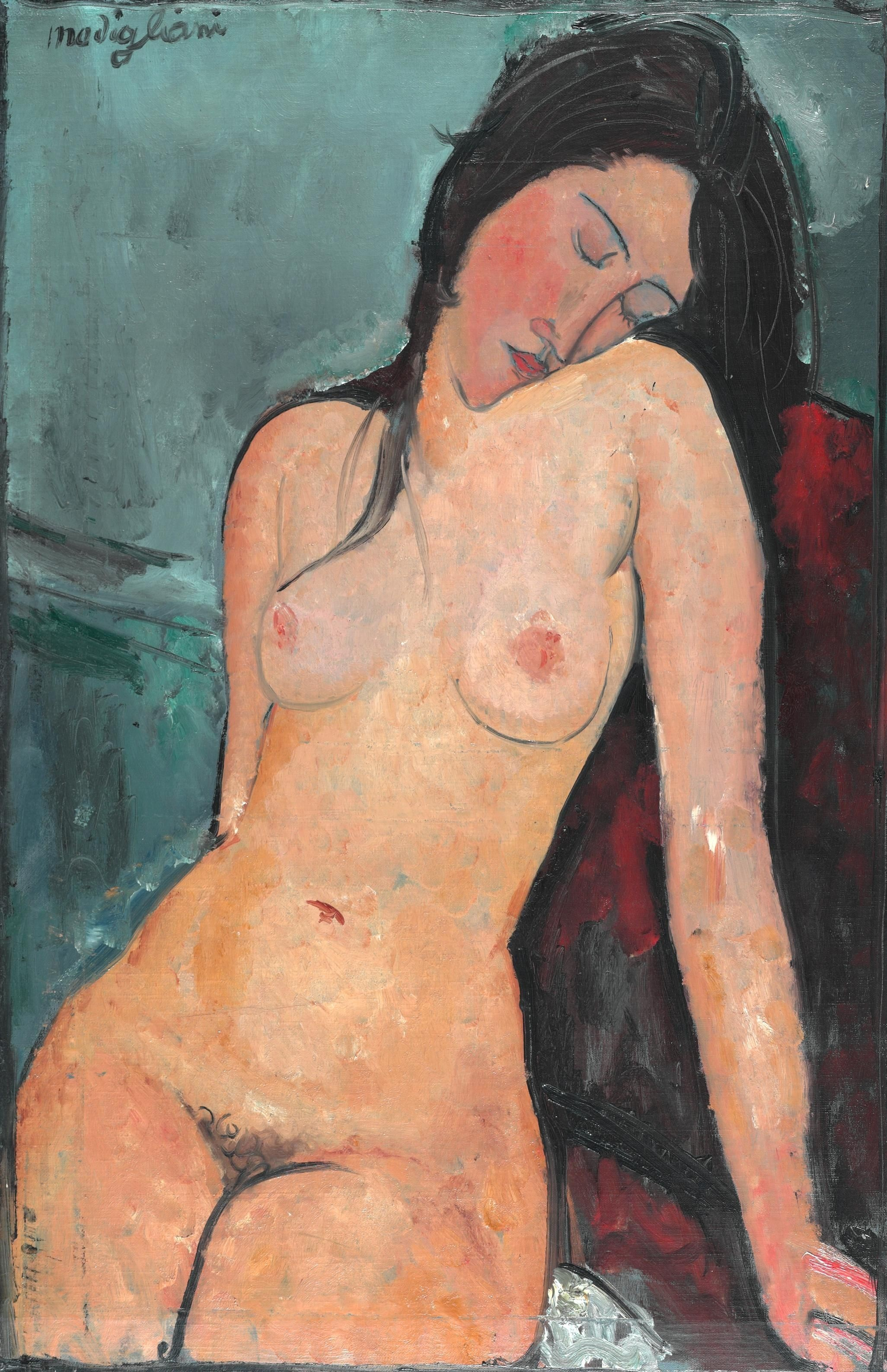
- Artist: Amedeo Modigliani
- Year: c. 1916
- Medium: oil on canvas
- Dimensions: 92.4 cm × 59.8 cm (36.4 in × 23.5 in)
- Location: Courtauld Gallery; London

Seated Nude is a 1916 oil on canvas painting by Amedeo Modigliani, now in the Courtauld Gallery. The painting is one of a famous series of nudes that Modigliani painted between 1916 and 1918, which include many of his most famous works. Its model was Beatrice Hastings, then the artist's lover.
