= Mick Davis (director) =

Scottish film director, producer and screenwriter

- Born: 1 August 1961 (age 64); Glasgow, Scotland, UK
- Occupations: Film director; screenwriter; producer; theatre director; novelist
- Years active: 1992–present

Michael Davis (born 1 August 1961) is a Scottish/American film director, screenwriter, producer, theater director and novelist.

== Early life ==
Born in Glasgow and raised in the Gorbals, Davis was bedridden with asthma during his childhood.

After outgrowing the condition, he worked as a fitness coach for his childhood football team Celtic F.C., where he befriended the singer Rod Stewart, an ardent supporter of Celtic. When Davis moved to Los Angeles to pursue a career in filmmaking, Stewart introduced him to contacts in showbusiness, helping to launch his career.

== Career ==
Davis' first major credit was as screenwriter on Love in Paris (also known as Another 9½ Weeks, a sequel to 9½ Weeks). He then wrote a screenplay titled Paganini, about the 18th-century virtuoso. The screenplay received significant attention, leading to his signing with Creative Artists Agency (CAA). Actor Mickey Rourke hired Davis to work on a script and they developed a close friendship, collaborating on several projects over the next decade. During this period, Davis began developing a script about the Italian painter Amedeo Modigliani with Al Pacino attached to play Modigliani and Martin Scorsese considering directing, although Davis would eventually write and direct Modigliani himself in 2004, with Andy García in the title role.

Davis's first writer-director project was the romantic comedy The Match, produced by Pierce Brosnan's Irish DreamTime, and starring Tom Sizemore, Richard E. Grant and Ian Holm.

His success in film opened opportunities in television, leading to his creation and writing of the American CBS/Warner Bros show Eleventh Hour, produced by Jerry Bruckheimer Productions and starring Rufus Sewell. He also wrote the supernatural film The Invisible, initially for a Swedish film company and later for Spyglass/Disney.

In 2013, Davis wrote, produced and directed a short film, Haunting Charles Manson, and the next year, a feature-length version of the same film.

He later adapted his original Paganini screenplay into a stage play, which he directed for the Metropolis Theate in Bucharest. The play was a significant success, running for three years.

More recently, Davis directed the comedy My Dad's Christmas Date, starring Jeremy Piven and Joely Richardson, as well as Father Christmas Is Back, featuring John Cleese and Kelsey Grammer. His recent work includes the horror film Walden, starring Emile Hirsch, which he wrote and directed. He also directed the comedy Trust In Love, which has won awards at multiple film festivals worldwide and was set for release in 2024.

Davis credits Mickey Rourke for giving him his first break, and Irish actor Richard Harris for being his mentor.
