= Léopold Zborowski =

Polish poet, writer and art dealer

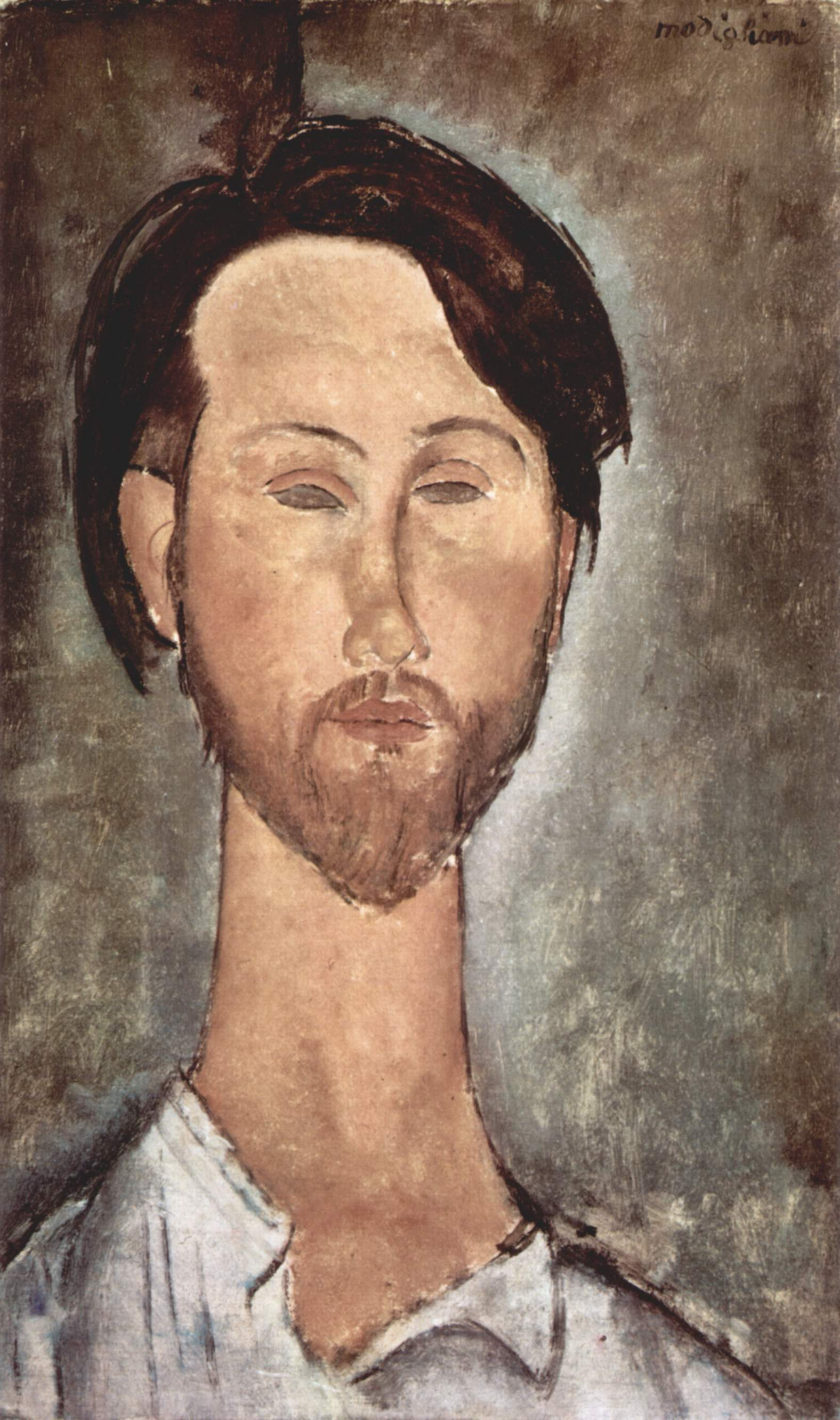
- Portrait of Léopold Zborowski by Amedeo Modigliani
- Born: Léopold Zborowski; 10 March 1889; Zaleszczyki, Kingdom of Galicia and Lodomeria, Austria-Hungary (now Ukraine)
- Died: 25 March 1932 (aged 43); Paris, France
- Occupation: Art dealer
- Years active: 1914–1930

Léopold Zborowski (1889–1932) was a Polish poet, writer and art dealer.

== Biography ==
He was born in Zaleszczyki, in what was then Kingdom of Galicia and Lodomeria of Austria-Hungary (now a part of Ukraine), to a Jewish family.

Zborowski and his wife Anna (Hanka Zborowska) were contemporaries with Parisian artists such as Chaïm Soutine, André Derain and Amedeo Modigliani, who painted Zborowski's portraits. Léopold Zborowski was Amedeo Modigliani's primary art dealer and friend during the artist's final years, organizing his expositions and letting the Leghorn (Livorno) artist use his house as an atelier. He also was the first art dealer of René Iché, Chaïm Soutine, Maurice Utrillo, Émile Savitry, Marc Chagall and André Derain. There are three portraits of him by Modigliani, including a 17 3/4" by 10 3/4" artwork sold for $1,464,000 at Sotheby's in 2003.

As Modigliani's art dealer, Zborowski accumulated a small fortune, which he lost during the Great Depression of the 1930s, ultimately dying poor in Paris in 1932 of a heart attack. His widow was forced to sell his whole collection, which is now completely dispersed.

His relationship with Modigliani, Utrillo and Soutine was dramatized by Dennis McIntrye in his play which was ultimately filmed as Modì, Three Days on the Wing of Madness, where he was portrayed by Stephen Graham.
