= Drevníky =

- Municipality
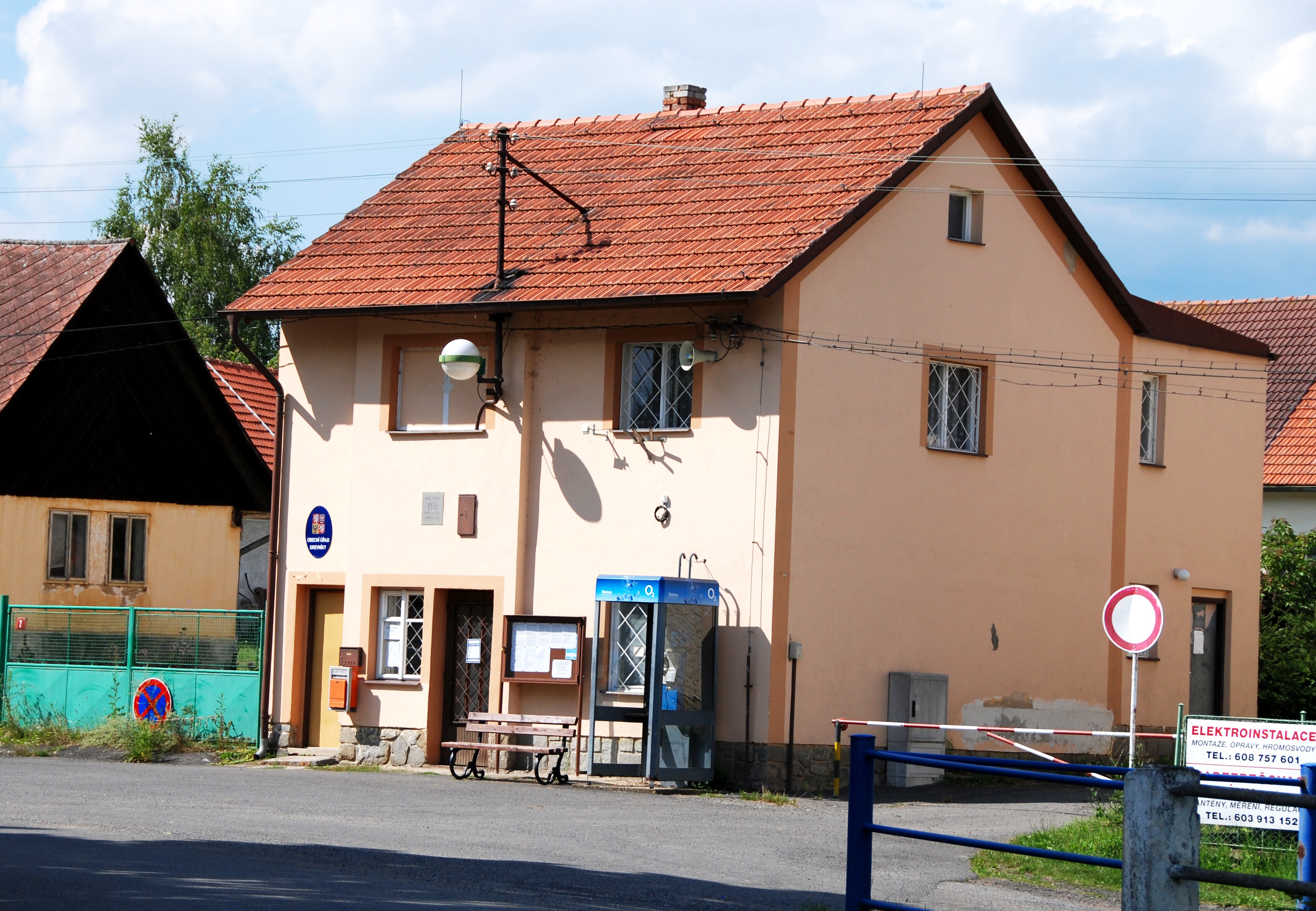
- Municipal office

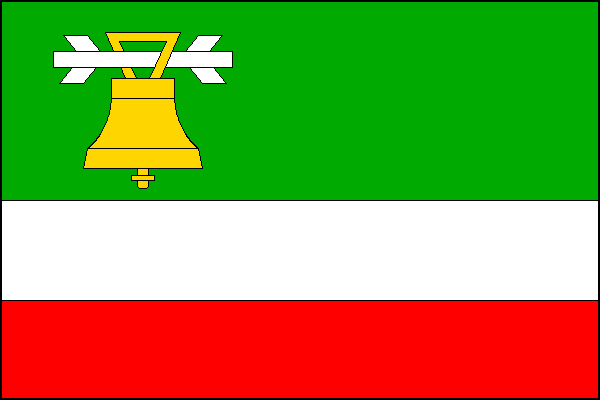
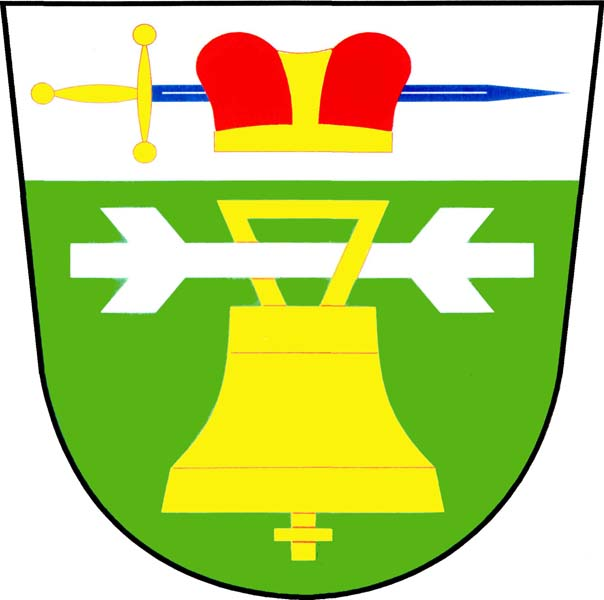
- Flag Coat of arms

- Location in the Czech Republic
- Coordinates: 49°43′13″N 14°16′27″E
- Country: Czech Republic
- Region: Central Bohemian
- District: Příbram
- First mentioned: 1348

Area
  - Total: 7.05 km^{2} (2.72 sq mi)
- Elevation: 331 m (1,086 ft)

Population (2026-01-01)
  - Total: 414
  - Density: 58.7/km^{2} (152/sq mi)
- Time zone: UTC+1 (CET)
  - Summer (DST): UTC+2 (CEST)
- Postal code: 263 01
- Website: www.drevniky.eu

Drevníky is a municipality and village in Příbram District in the Central Bohemian Region of the Czech Republic. It has about 400 inhabitants.

== Administrative division ==
Drevníky consists of four municipal parts (in brackets population according to the 2021 census):

- Drevníky (212)
- Drhovce (29)
- Nechalov (46)
- Slovanská Lhota (83)

== Etymology ==
The word drevník (derived from drvo = dialectally 'wood') referred to a person who works with wood. Drevníky was a village of such people.

== Geography ==
Drevníky is located about 19 kilometres (12 mi) east of Příbram and 36 km (22 mi) south of Prague. It lies in the Benešov Uplands. The highest point is the hill Na Skalách at 460 m (1,510 ft) above sea level.

== History ==
The first written mention of Drevníky is from 1348, when the village belonged to the Příbram estate. The village was established in the forests where wood was harvested for the royal chamber. The Colloredo-Mannsfeld family were the last owners of the village before the establishment of a sovereign municipality in 1848.

== Demographics ==
Historical population

Year	Pop.	±%
1869	616	—
1880	577	−6.3%
1890	611	+5.9%
1900	568	−7.0%
1910	506	−10.9%

Year	Pop.	±%
1921	513	+1.4%
1930	500	−2.5%
1950	407	−18.6%
1961	398	−2.2%
1970	351	−11.8%

Year	Pop.	±%
1980	326	−7.1%
1991	280	−14.1%
2001	291	+3.9%
2011	304	+4.5%
2021	370	+21.7%

Source: Censuses

== Transport ==
There are no railways or major roads passing through the municipality.

== Sights ==
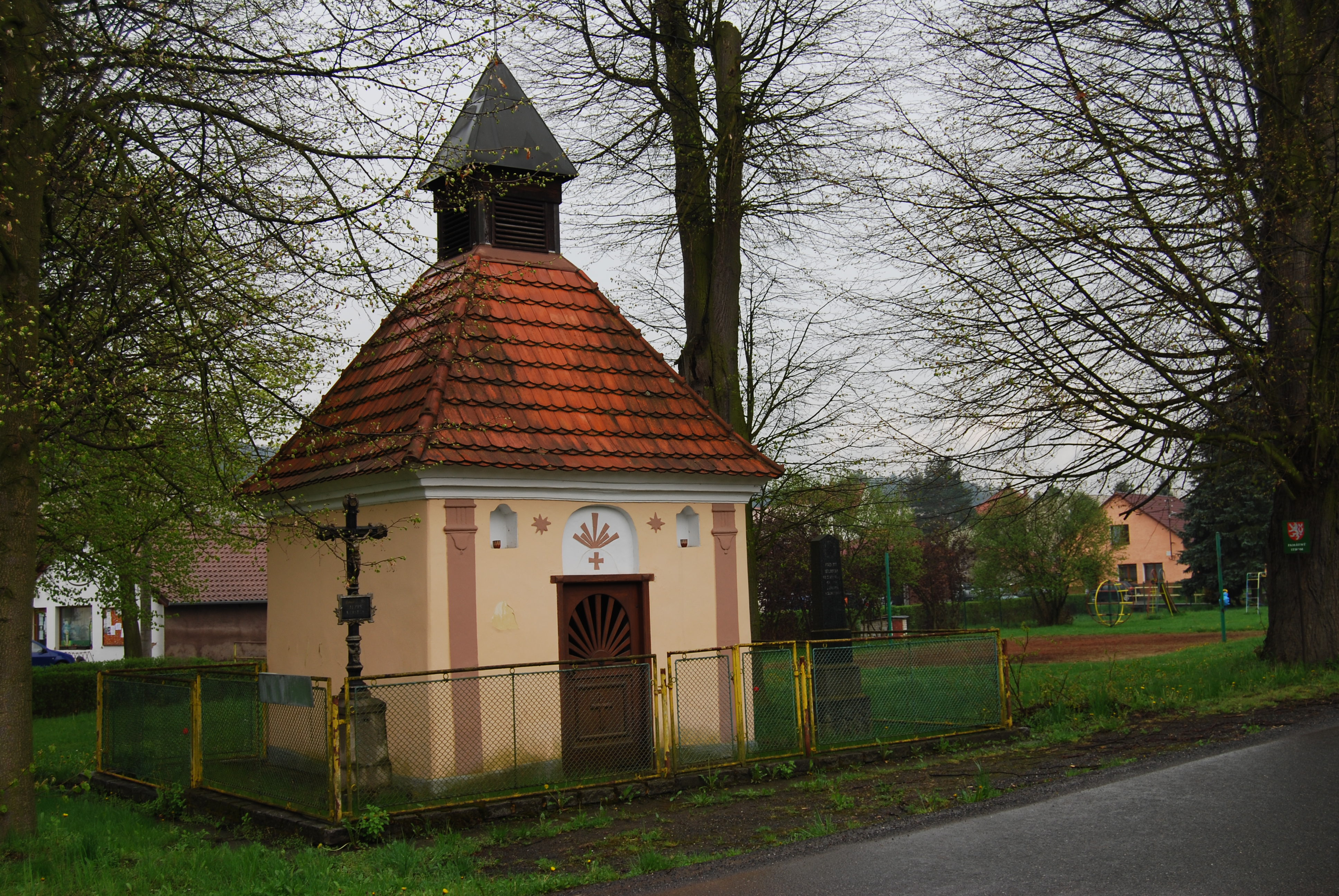
Chapel of Saint Wenceslaus

There are no protected cultural monuments in the municipality. The main landmark is the Chapel of Saint Wenceslaus with a belfry, built in 1844.
