= Maurice Utrillo =

French painter (1883–1955)

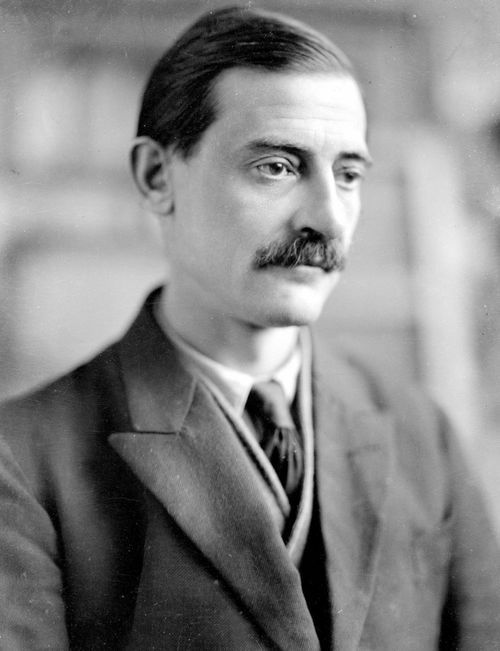
- Utrillo, ca. 1915-1920
- Born: Maurice Valadon; 26 December 1883; Montmartre, Paris, France
- Died: 5 November 1955 (aged 71); Dax, Aquitaine, France
- Education: Self-taught
- Known for: Painting
- Spouse: Lucie Valore
- Parent(s): Suzanne Valadon (mother); Miquel Utrillo (legal father)

Signature
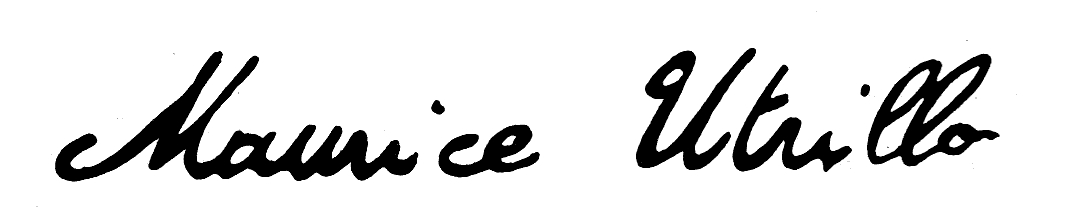

Maurice Utrillo (French: [mɔʁis ytʁijo, moʁ-]; born Maurice Valadon; 26 December 1883 – 5 November 1955) was a French painter of the School of Paris who specialized in cityscapes. From the Montmartre quarter of Paris, France, Utrillo is one of the few famous painters of Montmartre to have been born there.

== Biography ==
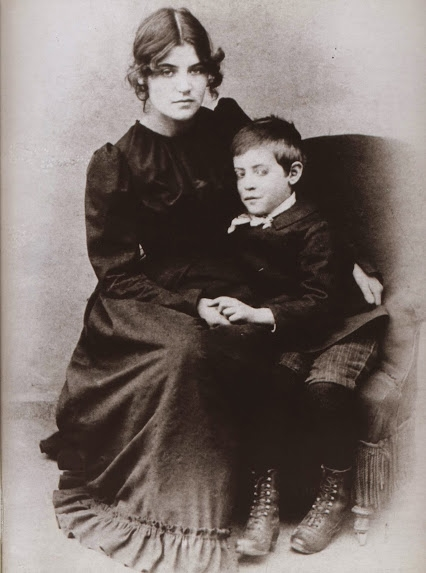
Maurice Utrillo and his mother Suzanne Valadon, 1890

Utrillo was the son of the artist Suzanne Valadon (born Marie-Clémentine Valadon), who was then an eighteen-year-old artist's model. She never revealed the father of her child; speculation exists that he was the offspring of a liaison with an equally young amateur painter named Boissy, or with the well-established painter Pierre-Cécile Puvis de Chavannes, or even with Renoir. (See below under Paternity). In 1891 a Spanish artist, Miquel Utrillo, signed a legal document acknowledging paternity, although the question remains as to whether he was in fact the child's father.

Valadon, who became a model after a fall from a trapeze ended her chosen career as a circus acrobat, found that posing for Berthe Morisot, Renoir, Henri de Toulouse-Lautrec, and others provided her with an opportunity to study their techniques. She taught herself to paint, and when Toulouse-Lautrec introduced her to Edgar Degas, he became her mentor. Eventually, she became a peer of the artists she had posed for.

Meanwhile, her mother was left to raise the young Maurice, who soon showed a troubling inclination toward truancy and alcoholism. When schizophrenia took hold of the 21-year-old Utrillo in 1904, his mother encouraged him to take up painting. He soon showed real artistic talent. With no training beyond what his mother taught him, he drew and painted what he saw in Montmartre. After 1910 his work attracted critical attention, and by 1920 he was internationally acclaimed. In 1928, the French government awarded him the Cross of the Légion d'honneur. Throughout his life, however, he was interned in mental asylums repeatedly.

Today, tourists to the area will find many of his paintings on postcards, one of which is his very popular 1936 painting entitled Montmartre Street Corner or Lapin Agile.

In middle age Utrillo became fervently religious and in 1935, at the age of fifty-two, he married Lucie Valore and moved to Le Vésinet, just outside Paris. By that time, he was too ill to work in the open air and painted landscapes viewed from windows, from postcards, and from memory.

Although his life also was plagued by alcoholism, he lived into his seventies. Maurice Utrillo died on 5 November 1955 in Hotel Splendid in Dax, at age 72, of a lung disease, and was buried in the Cimetière Saint-Vincent in Montmartre.

== Paternity ==
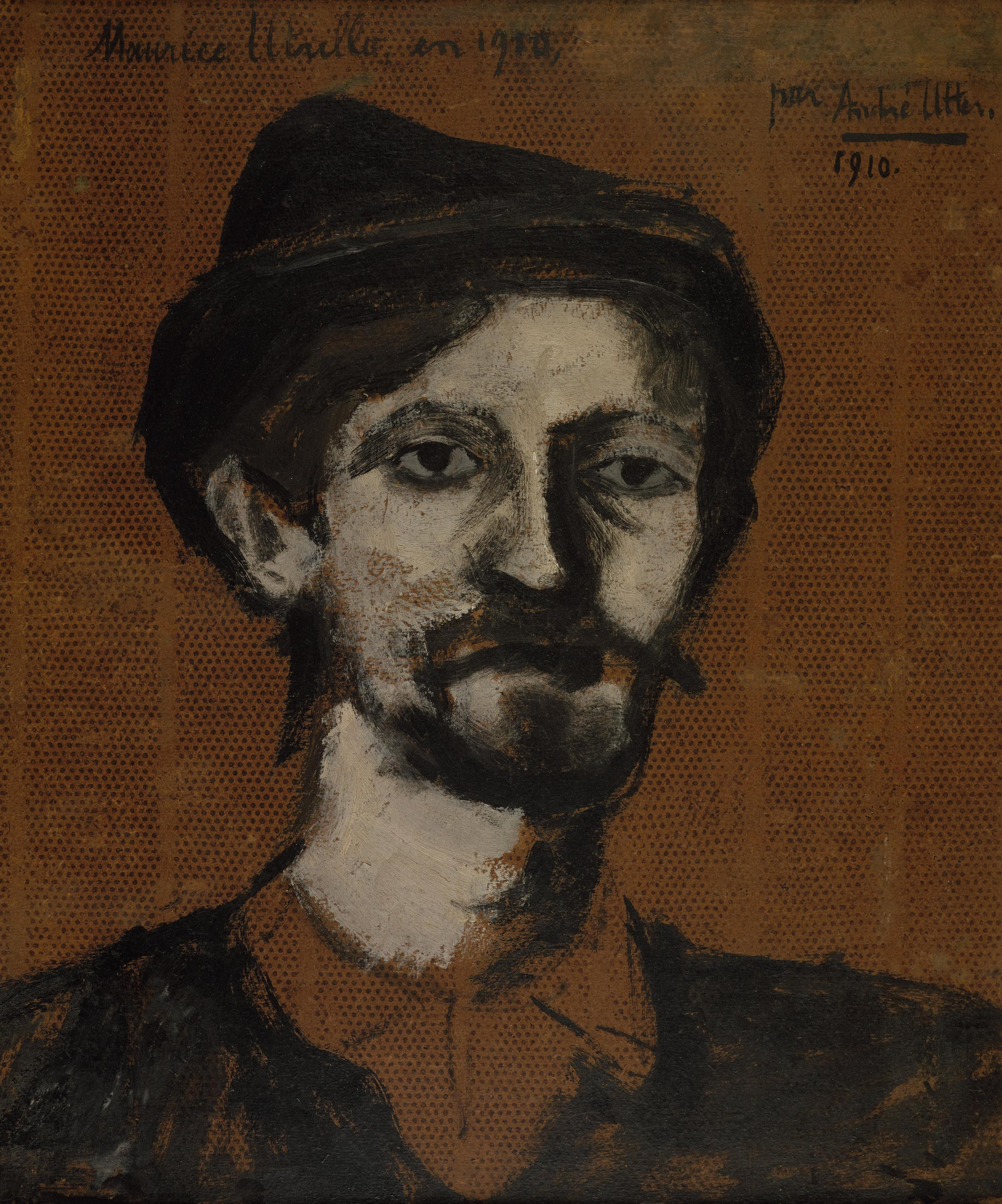
Maurice Utrillo en 1910, by André Utter

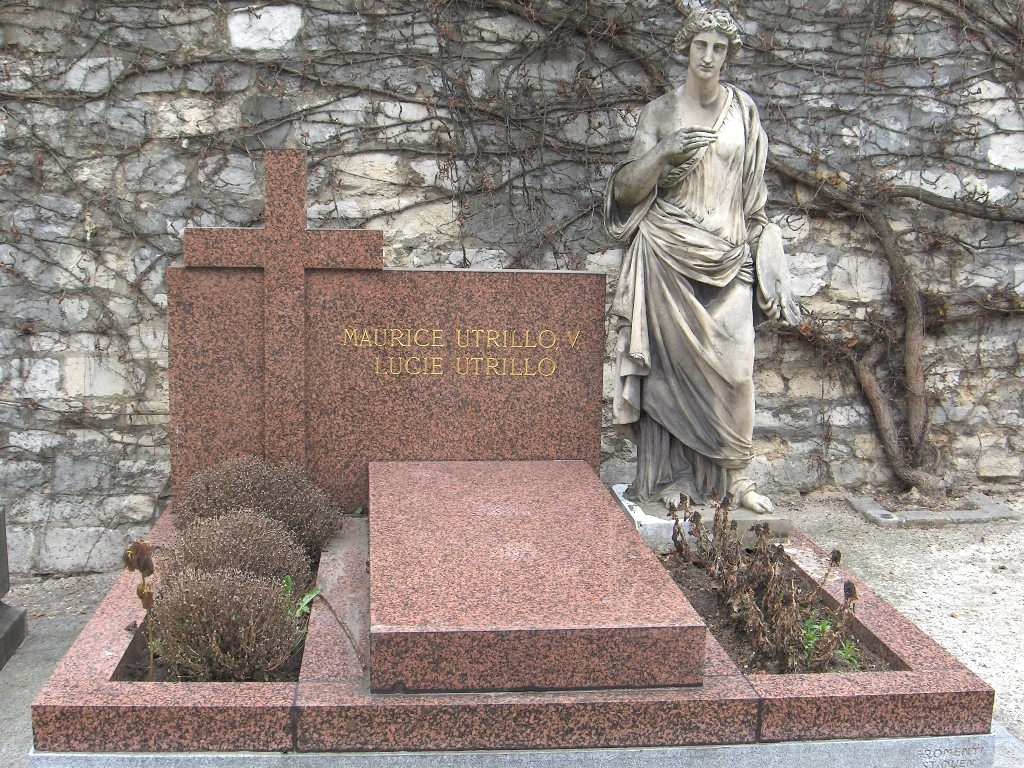
Tomb of Utrillo, Cemetery Saint Vincent, Paris

An apocryphal anecdote told by Diego Rivera concerning Utrillo's paternity is related in the unpublished memoirs of one of his American collectors, Ruth Bakwin:

"After Maurice was born to Suzanne Valadon, she went to Renoir, for whom she had modeled nine months previously. Renoir looked at the baby and said, 'He can't be mine, the color is terrible!' Next she went to Degas, for whom she had also modeled. He said, 'He can't be mine, the form is terrible!' At a cafe, Valadon saw an artist she knew named Miguel Utrillo, to whom she spilled her woes. The man told her to call the baby Utrillo: 'I would be glad to put my name to the work of either Renoir or Degas!'"

== 2010 exhibitions and sale ==
In 2010, several retrospective exhibitions were staged, at Oglethorpe University Museum of Art and in Montmartre (Paris) that culminated in an auction of 30 of Utrillo's works on 30 November 2010 from the collection of Paul Pétridès, Utrillo's art dealer, whose Galerie Pétridès also dealt with the likes of Jacques Thévenet. This follows the exhibition of Suzanne Valadon and Maurice Utrillo's works held in Paris in 2009.

== Nazi-looted art ==
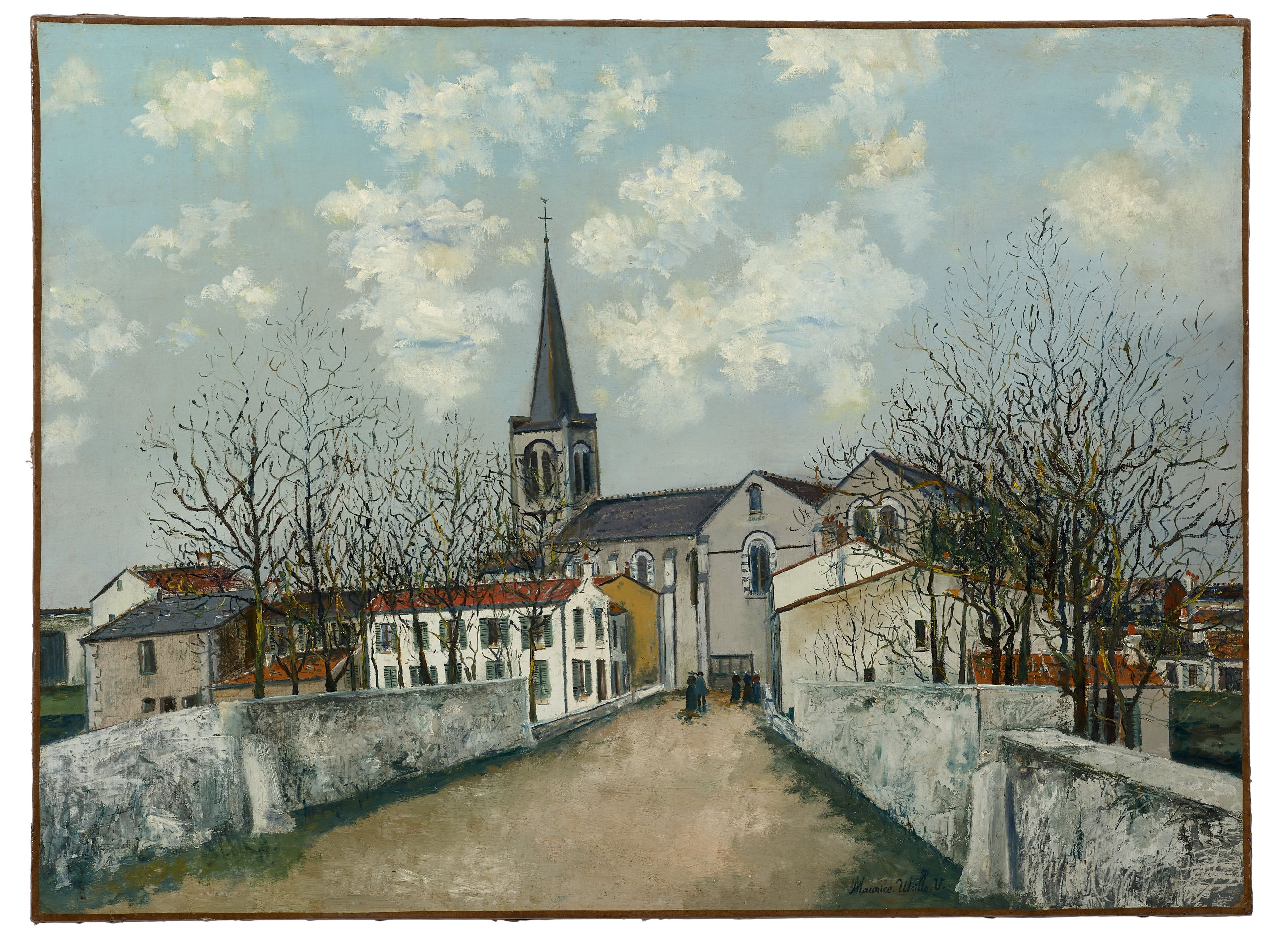
Église de Pont-Saint-Martin (Loire-Atlantique), 1917 - Maurice Utrillo

In 2022, Utrillo's Carrefour à Sannois, which the Nazis had looted from the French Jewish art collector and dealer Georges Bernheim in 1940, was restituted to the heirs after a long legal battle. The city of Sannois (Val-d'Oise) had bought the painting at Sotheby's in 2004. In 2015, the Commission responsible for dealing with Nazi-looted art (the CIVS) advised the town that the painting had been looted. A new law voted by France's National Assembly in 2022 paved the way for restitution.

Église de Pont-Saint-Martin (Church of Pont-Saint-Martin), a 1917 painting by Utrillo, was seized by the Nazis on 29 August 1940. It was transferred to Berlin, and then to the Tentschach Castle in Austria, where it was found in 1951. It was given to the Musée National d'Art Moderne in 1953, waiting for finding the rightful owner. In 2022, it was given to the heirs of Štefan Osuský, who was ambassador of Czechoslovakia in Paris in 1940.

== In popular culture ==
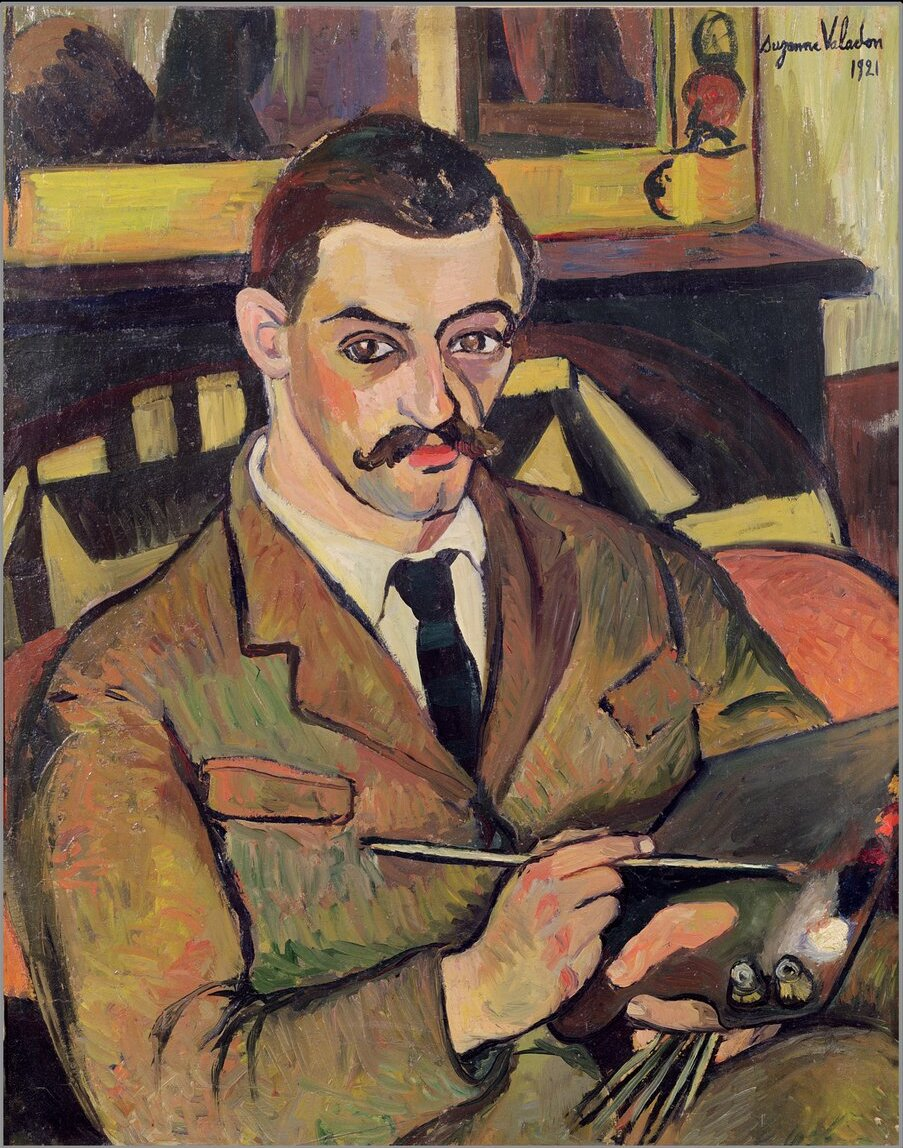
Portrait of Maurice Utrillo (1921), by Suzanne Valadon, his mother)

Utrillo is played by Bruno Gouery in the 2024 film Modì, Three Days on the Wing of Madness directed and co-produced by Johnny Depp.

== Selected works ==
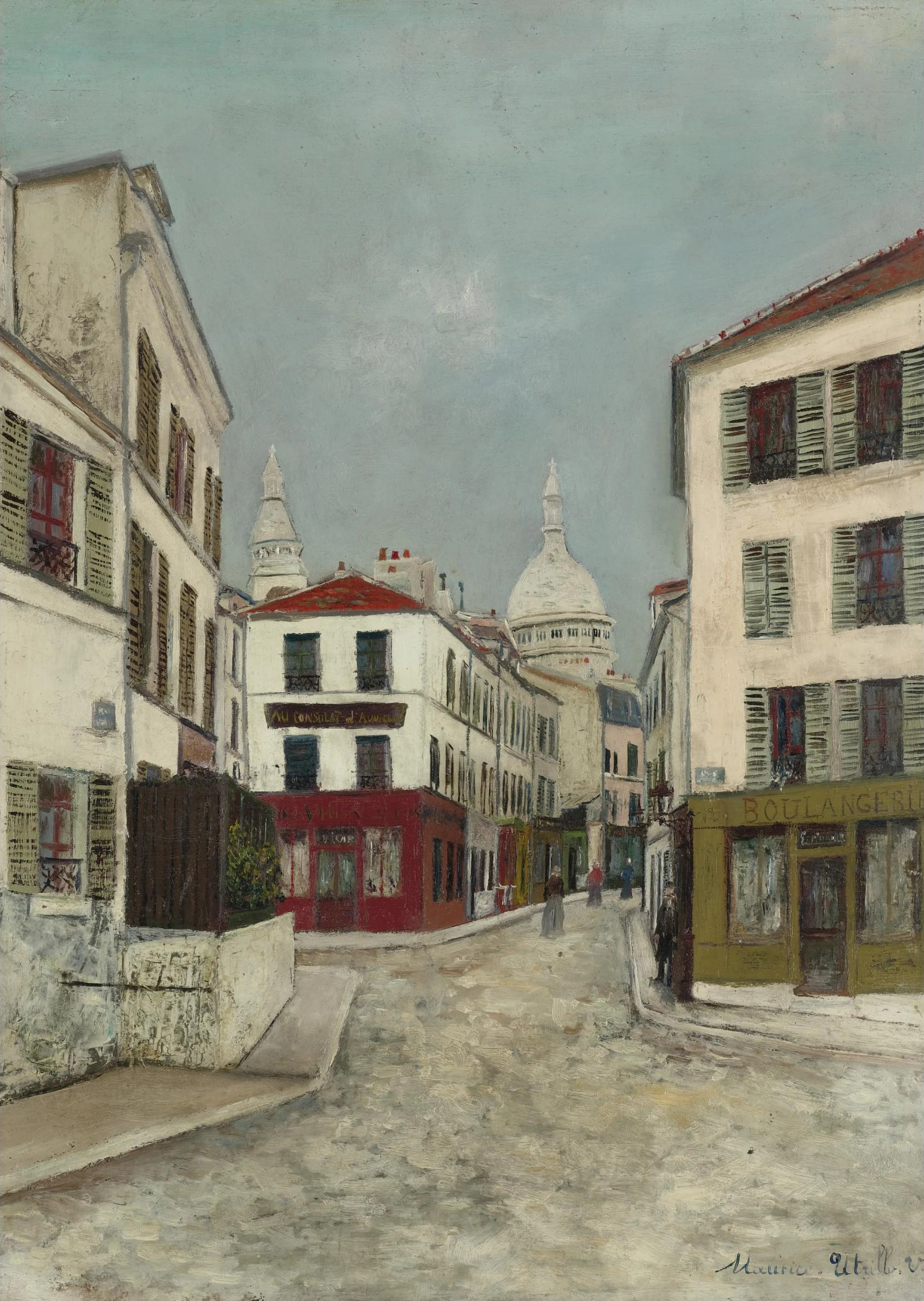
La Rue Norvins à Montmartre, 1910

Place du Tertre, 1911

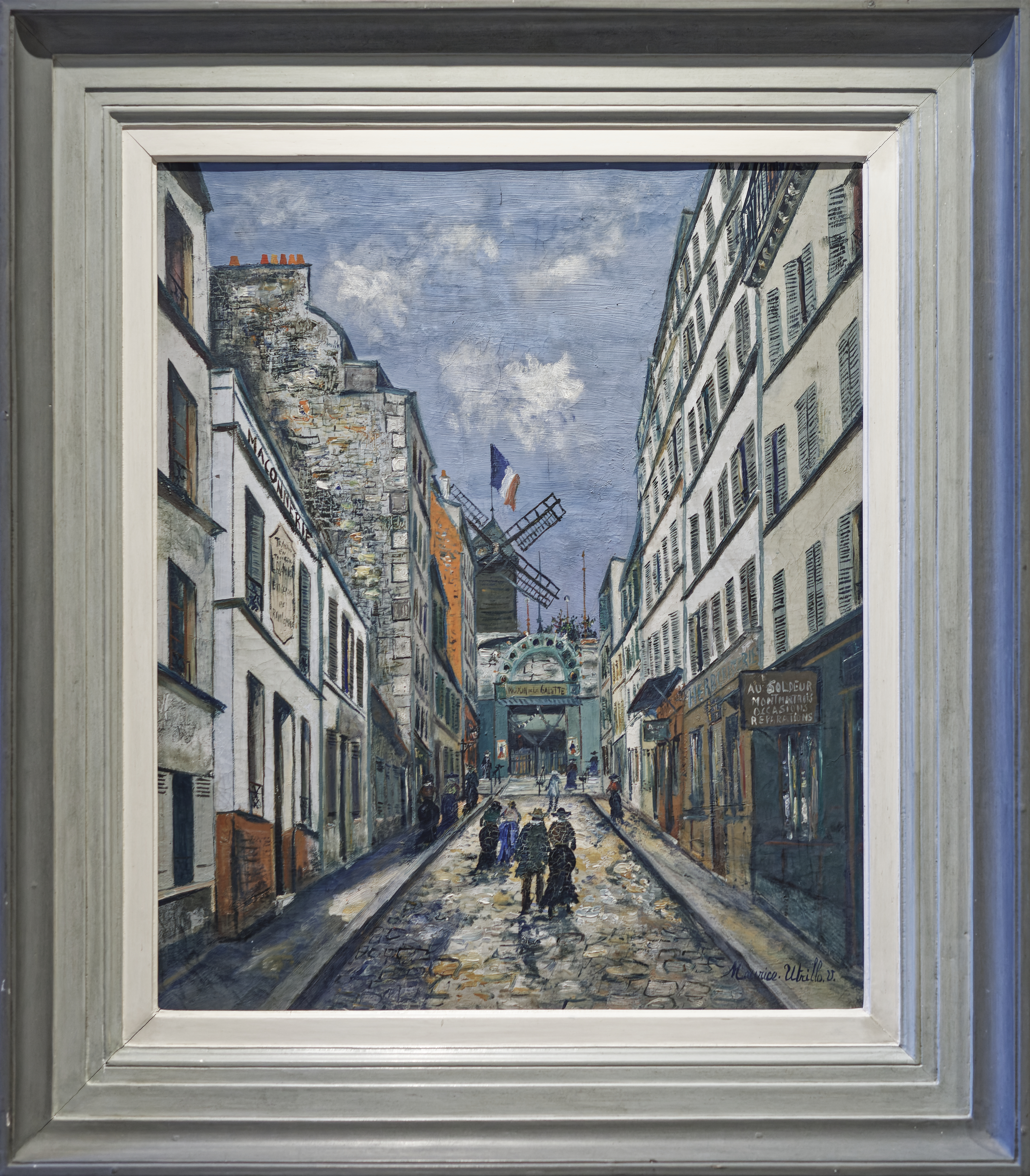

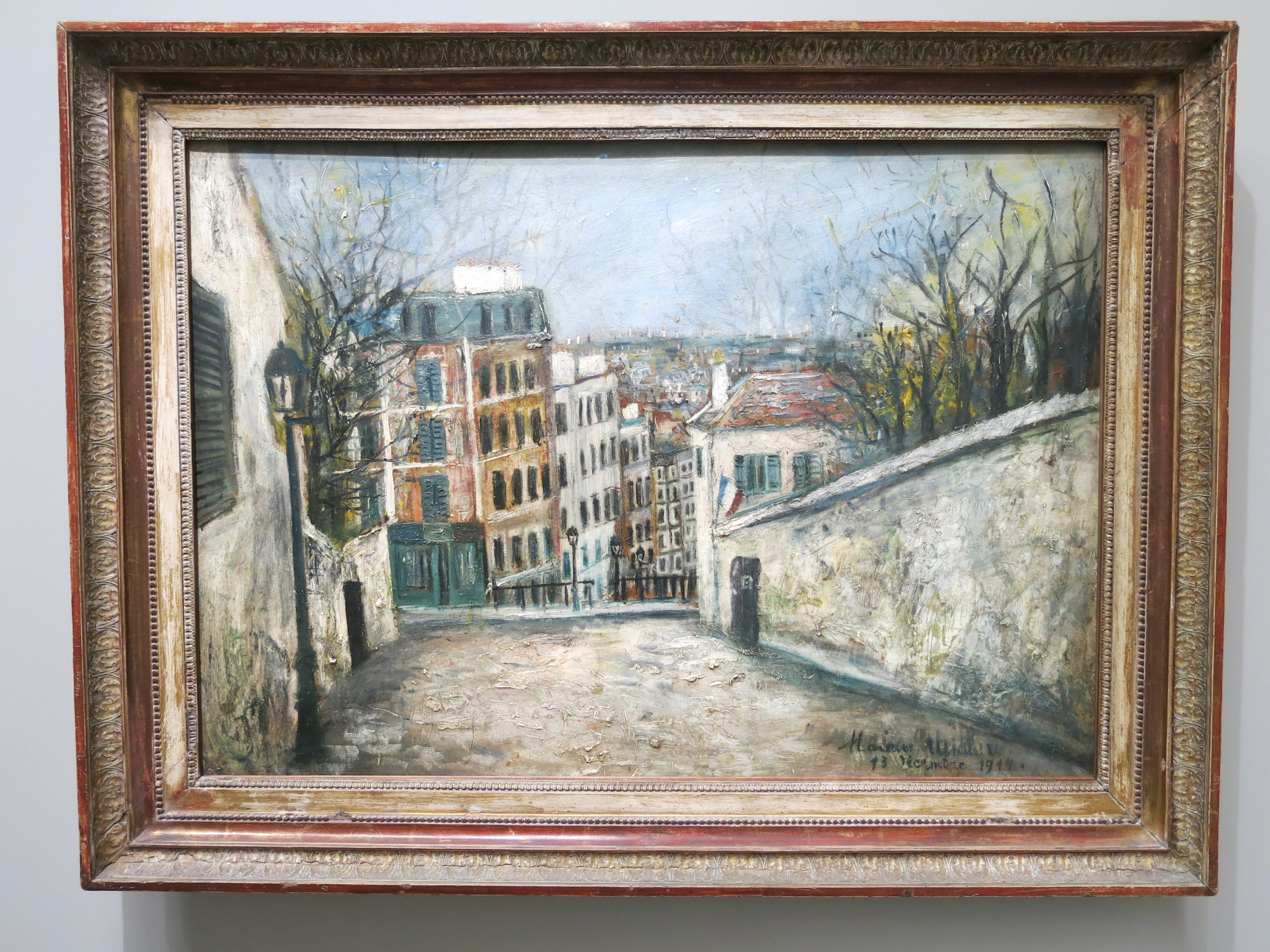

== See also ==
- Musée de Montmartre, former home in Montmartre

== Sources ==
- Warnod, Jeanine (1981). Suzanne Valadon. Translated by Jennings, Shirley (First ed.). New York: Crown. ISBN 9780517544990. OCLC 7573059.
