= Beatrice Hastings =

British writer and poet

- Hastings in 1898
- Born: Emily Alice Haigh; 27 January 1879; Hackney, London, England
- Died: 30 October 1943 (aged 64); Worthing, West Sussex, England
- Occupations: Writer and critic
- Writing career
- Pen name: Beatrice Tina, D. Triformis, Alice Morning, Robert á Field, and others
- Period: Early 20th century

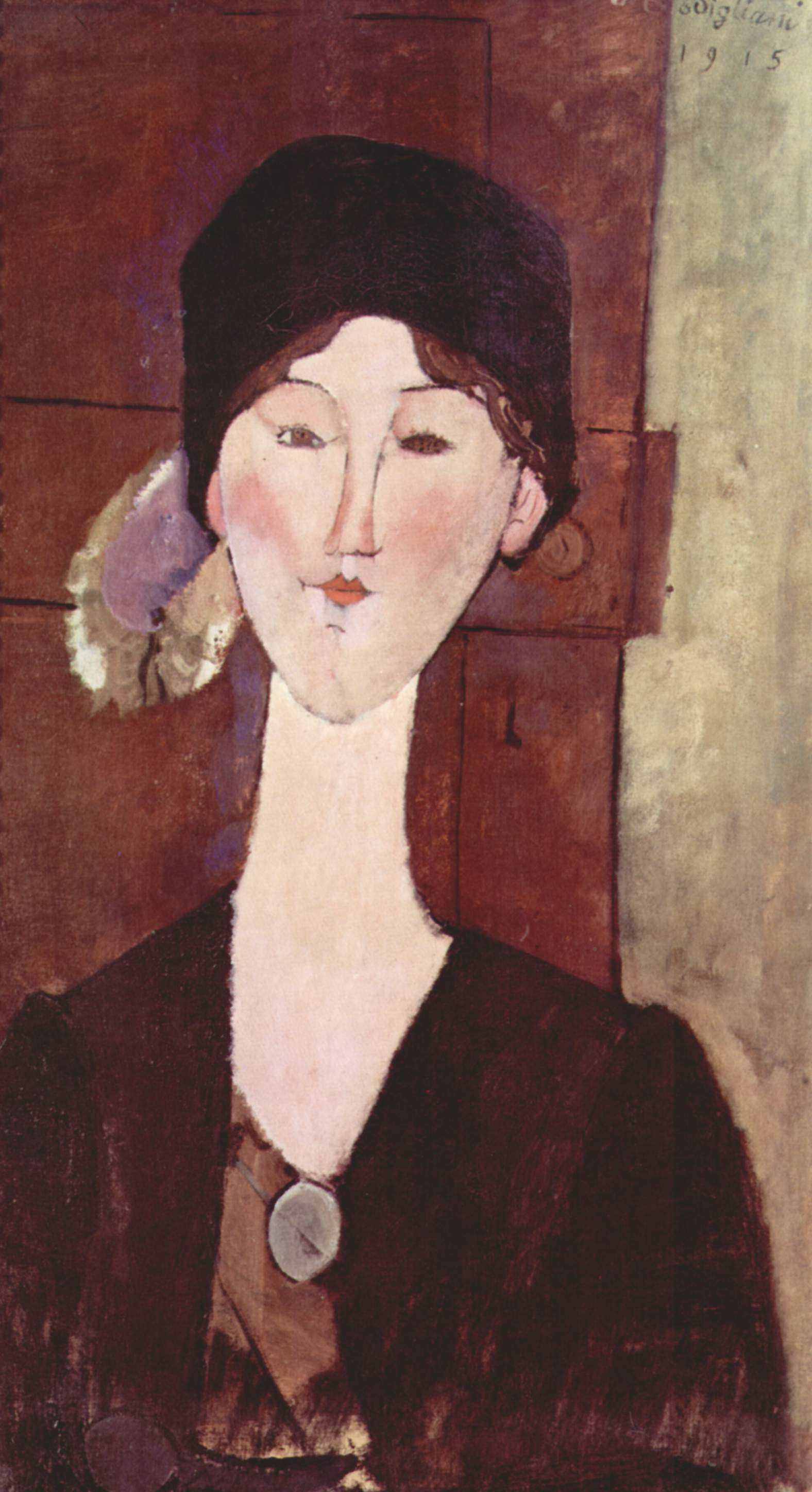
Beatrice Hastings devant une porte by Amedeo Modigliani, 1915

Beatrice Hastings was the pen name of Emily Alice Haigh (27 January 1879 – 30 October 1943), an English writer, literary critic, poet and theosophist. Her work was integral to British magazine The New Age which she helped edit along with her lover, A. R. Orage, prior to the outbreak of World War I. Hastings was also friend and lover of Katherine Mansfield, whose work was first published in The New Age. She also had love affairs with Wyndham Lewis and Amedeo Modigliani.

== Biography ==
Beatrice Hastings was born in London but grew up in Port Elizabeth, South Africa. She was educated in Pevensey, Sussex, near Hastings, which may have supplied her chosen name. From 1896 to 1899, she attended the University of Oxford to study literature.

In 1907 she met A. R. Orage, the editor of The New Age magazine, with whom she embarked on a romantic relationship. Hastings soon began contributing to the magazine and went on to become one of its most prolific contributors, although most of her work appeared under pseudonyms. These include: Pagan, Alice Morning, A.M.A., E.H., B.L.H., Beatrice Tina, Cynicus, Robert a Field, T.K.L., D. Triformis, Edward Stafford, S. Robert West, V.M., G. Whiz, J. Wilson, Annette Doorly, Hastings Lloyd, Mrs. Malaprop, and T.W.

Hastings' work for The New Age spanned many different forms and genres, including items of correspondence, parody, poetry, polemic, travel writing, prose fiction, and dramatic dialogue. She described herself in one instance as 'a minor poet of the first class.'. One of Hastings' greatest talents was parody, and she composed parodies of many her contemporaries, including Ezra Pound, Filippo Marinetti, and H. G. Wells. Hastings was also outspoken in her feminist views and The New Age correspondence section provided the space in which she developed many of the ideas which would inform her 1909 feminist tract, Woman's Worst Enemy: Woman.

In 1914 Hastings moved to Paris and became a figure in bohemian circles due to her friendship with Max Jacob. She shared an apartment in Montparnasse with Amedeo Modigliani and became a model for 14 of his paintings, including his 1916 Seated Nude. Another friend was adventure novelist Charles Beadle, with whom she had several things in common. He grew up in Hackney, spent time in South Africa (participating in the Boer War as a member of the British South African Police), and published several novels about bohemian life in Paris. When Beadle came to America, from Paris, in November 1916, he listed Hastings as his nearest friend in Paris.

Towards the end of her life Hastings felt excluded from the literary recognition she felt her due, and blamed Orage, whom she accused of conspiring to keep her out of literary circles in Britain. She published a pamphlet, The Old New Age (1936), in which she bitterly criticised Orage, calling him 'a rustic, a lout, a snob'. Hastings claimed that she 'offended Orage's masculine amour-propre, and for this, was made the victim of a social cabale [...] a literary boycott that does, or should, matter to every reading person'. While many of the contents of this pamphlet are thought to be exaggerated, it nevertheless shines a light on Orage's already well-documented misogyny, and the experience of being a female author in the 1910s.

In 1943, probably suffering from cancer, she killed herself with gas from a domestic cooker.

== Posthumous recognition ==
Although in her lifetime Hastings was regarded as a relatively minor literary figure, more recently she has been praised for her innovative use of pseudonyms and her pioneering feminist views.

Wallace Martin mentions her in his seminal study of The New Age, commenting that "Beatrice Hastings displayed amazing versatility as reviewer, poet, and satirist; she was most effective, albeit unnecessarily malicious, in the last capacity."

Literary critic Robert Scholes has noted that "Hastings, who was an important presence on the New Age editorial staff before the war, had an unhappy life that ended in suicide, never receiving the recognition as a writer that she sought."

== Theosophy ==
Hastings was a convert to Theosophy. She attempted to defend Helena Blavatsky from charges of fraud and plagiarism. In 1937, she published two volumes entitled Defence of Madame Blavatsky.

Her writings on Theosophy have been criticized by skeptics. Biographer Peter Washington suggested that Hastings "suffered from delusions of literary grandeur."

== Publications ==
- Woman's Worst Enemy – Woman, 1909
- The Maids' Comedy: A Chivalric Romance in Thirteen Chapters, 1911
- The Old "New Age"—Orage and Others, Blue Moon Press, 1935
- Defence of Madame Blavatsky (Volume 1, Volume 2), Hastings Press, 1937
