= Jeanne Hébuterne =

French painter (1898–1920)

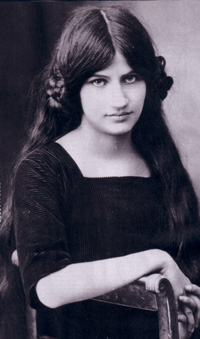
- Jeanne Hébuterne in 1916
- Born: 6 April 1898; Meaux, Seine-et-Marne, France
- Died: 26 January 1920 (aged 21); Paris, France
- Resting place: Père Lachaise Cemetery
- Occupations: Painter, model
- Partner: Amedeo Modigliani (1917–1920; his death)
- Children: Jeanne Modigliani
- Relatives: André Hébuterne (brother)

Jeanne Hébuterne (French: [ʒan ebytɛʁn]; 6 April 1898 – 26 January 1920) was a French painter and art model best known as the frequent subject and common-law wife of the artist Amedeo Modigliani. She died by suicide two days after Modigliani's death, and is now buried beside him.

== Early life, family and education ==
Jeanne Hébuterne was born in Meaux, Seine-et-Marne, the second child to Achille Casimir Hébuterne (born 1857), who worked at Le Bon Marché, a department store, and Eudoxie Anaïs Tellier Hébuterne. The family was staunchly Roman Catholic.

A beautiful girl, she was introduced to the artistic community in Montparnasse by her brother André Hébuterne, who wanted to become a painter. She met several of the then-starving artists and modeled for Tsuguharu Foujita.

Wanting to pursue a career in the arts, and with a talent for drawing, she chose to study at the Académie Colarossi, where in the spring of 1917 Hébuterne was introduced to Amedeo Modigliani by the sculptor Chana Orloff, who came with many other artists to take advantage of the academy's live models.

Jeanne began an affair with the charismatic artist, and the two fell deeply in love. She soon moved in with him, despite strong objections from her parents.

== Life with Modigliani ==
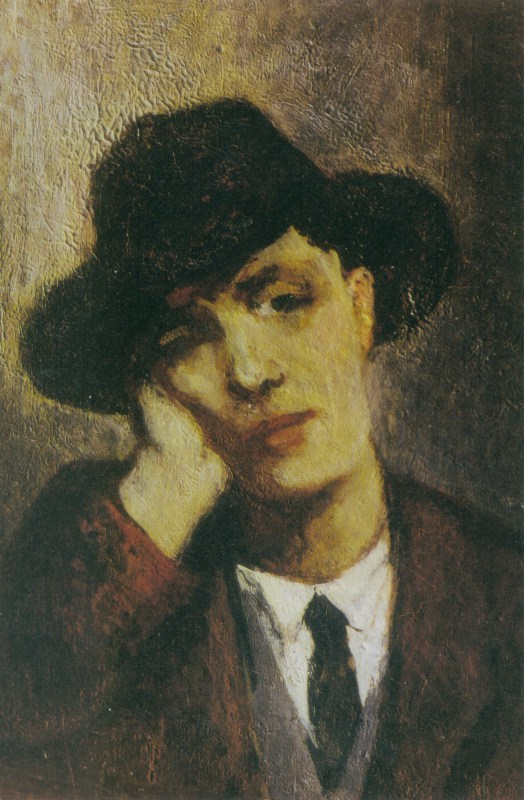
Portrait of Modigliani, 1919, by Jeanne Hébuterne

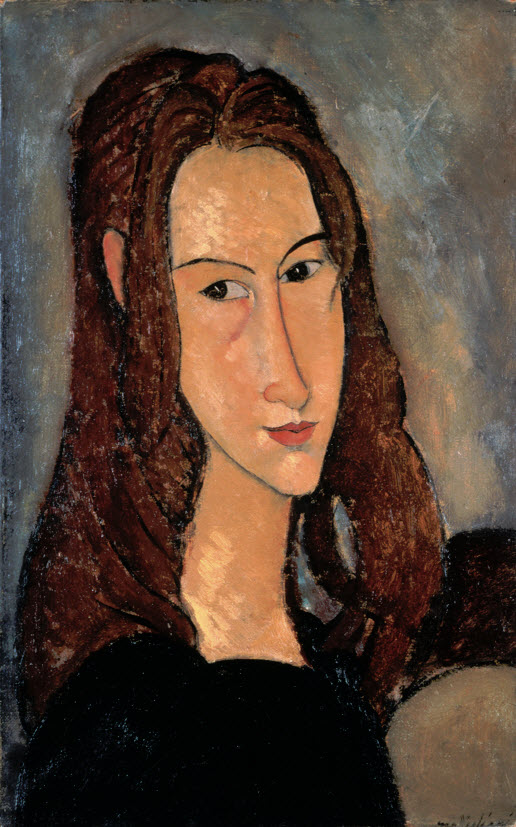
Hébuterne by Modigliani, 1918

Described by the writer Charles-Albert Cingria (1883–1954) as gentle, shy, quiet, and delicate, Jeanne Hébuterne became a principal subject for Modigliani's art.

In the spring of 1918, the couple moved to the warmer climate of Nice on the French Riviera where Modigliani's agent hoped he might raise his profile by selling some of his works to the wealthy art connoisseurs who wintered there. While they were in Nice, their daughter, Jeanne Modigliani, was born on 29 November. Hébuterne faced domestic violence from Modigliani during her relationship with him. A witness described him as behaving 'like a madman, crazy with savage hatred', throwing Jeanne against railings and dragging her along by her hair.

The following spring, they returned to Paris. While suffering from postnatal depression, Jeanne became pregnant again. By this time, Modigliani was suffering from tuberculous meningitis and his health, made worse by complications brought on by substance abuse, was deteriorating badly.

== Death ==
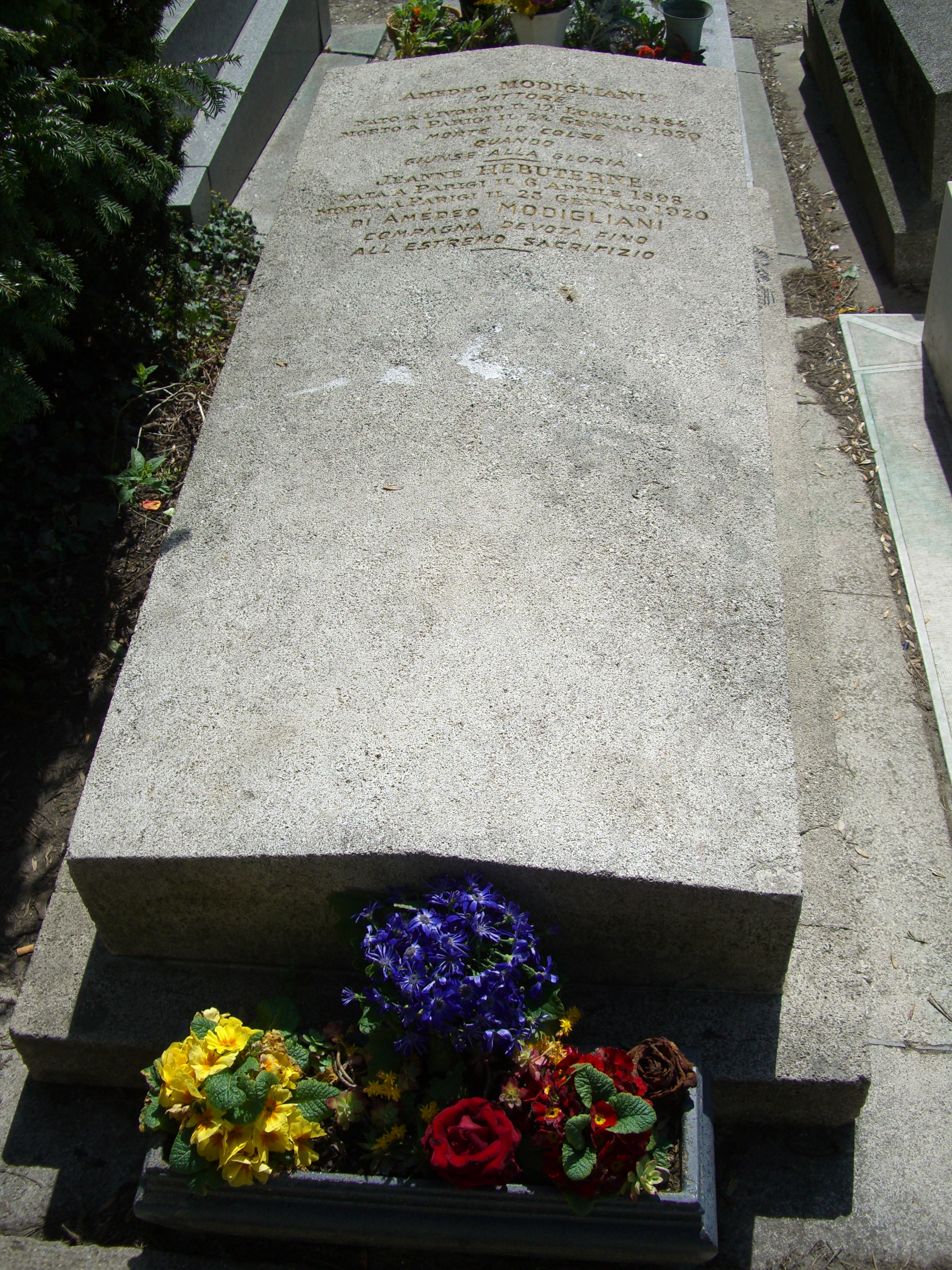
Amedeo Modigliani and Jeanne's grave

On 24 January 1920, Modigliani died, when Jeanne was eight months pregnant with their second child. Hébuterne's family brought her to their home, but she threw herself out of the fifth-floor apartment window two days after Modigliani's death, (Note: The date of death engraved on her tombstone, 25 January 1920, is erroneous.) killing herself and her unborn child, a son.

Her family, who blamed her demise on Modigliani, interred her in the Cimetière de Bagneux. Nearly ten years later, at the request of Modigliani's brother, Emanuele, the Hébuterne family had her remains transferred to Père Lachaise Cemetery to rest beside Modigliani.

Her epitaph reads: "Devoted companion to the extreme sacrifice" (in Italian "compagna devota fino all’estremo sacrifizio").

== Legacy ==
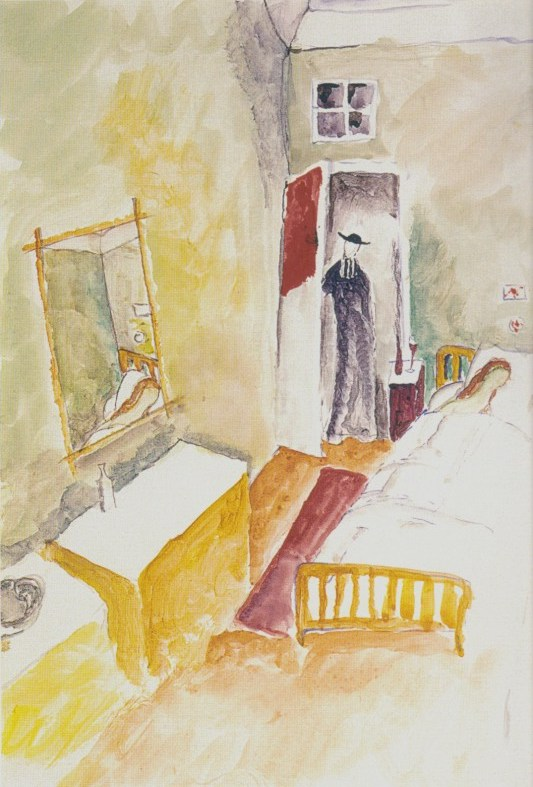
Death, 1919, by Jeanne Hébuterne

Their orphaned daughter, Jeanne Modigliani (1918–1984), was adopted by her father's sister in Florence, Italy. She knew virtually nothing of her parents until, as an adult, she researched their lives. In 1958, she wrote a biography of her father that was published in the English language in the United States as Modigliani: Man and Myth. ISBN 1-199-15698-1

After more than thirty years, an art scholar persuaded the Hébuterne heirs to allow public access to Jeanne Hébuterne's artwork. In October 2000, her works were featured at a major Modigliani exhibition in Venice, Italy, by the Fondazione Giorgio Cini. However, it was revealed in January 2010 that the works presented at the exhibition were forged. Christian Parisot, the curator of the exhibition was accused by Hébuterne's grandnephew of faking 77 drawings. Parisot was sentenced to a two-year suspended sentence and a €50,000 ($70,000) fine by a French court of appeals.

== Gallery ==
=== Works by Jeanne Hébuterne ===
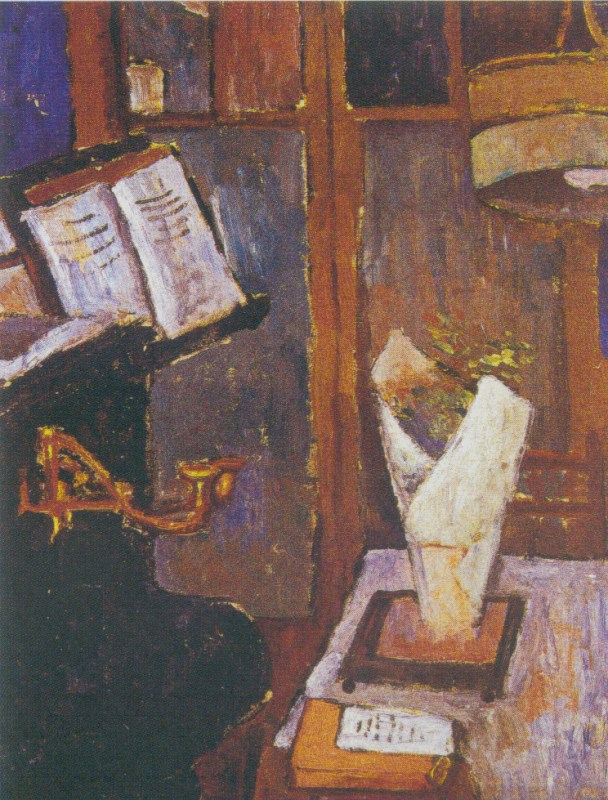
Natura morta

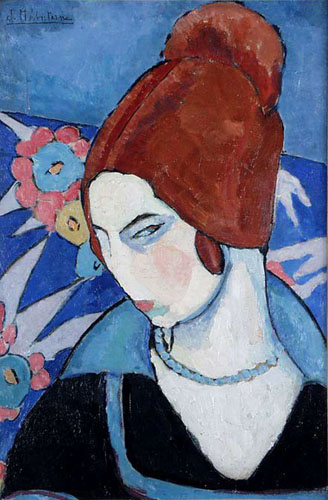
Self portrait, 1916

=== Works by Modigliani featuring Hébuterne ===
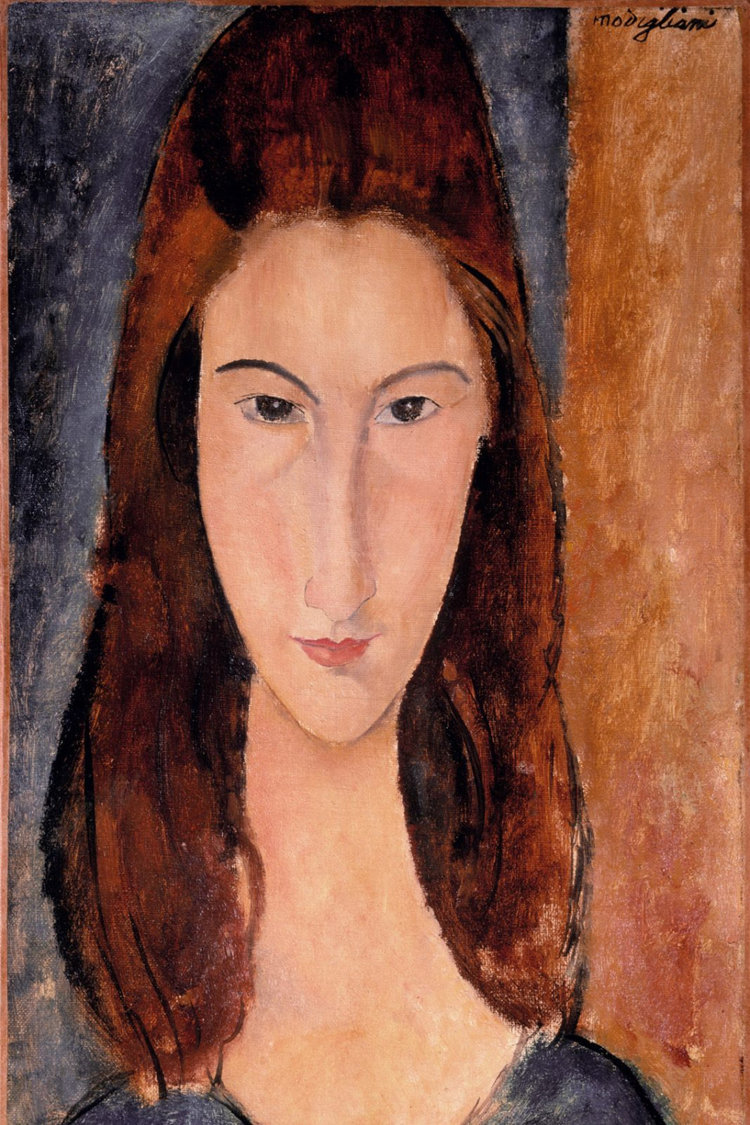
Portrait of Jeanne Hebuterne by Amedeo Modigliani

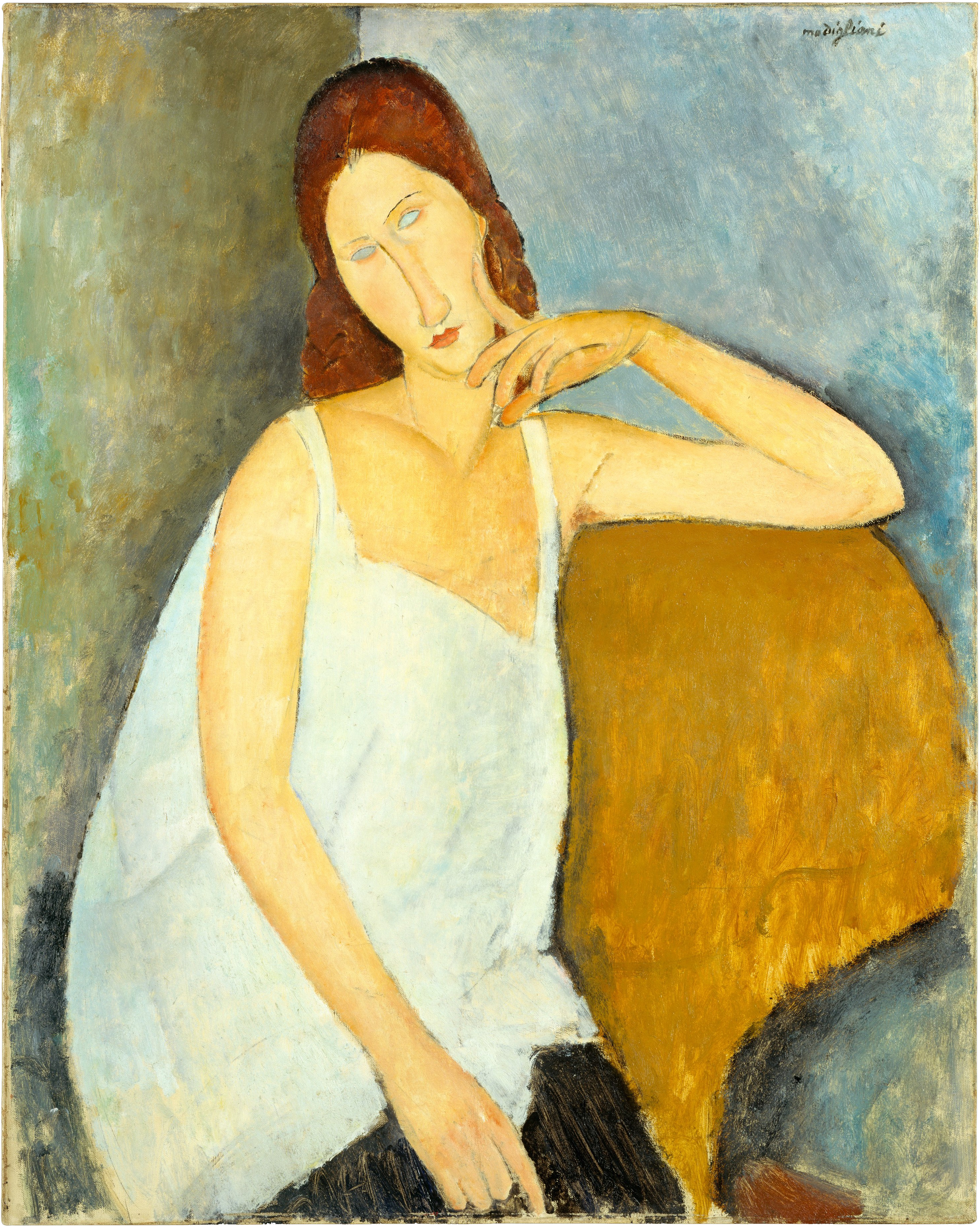
Jeanne Hébuterne by Modigliani, 1919

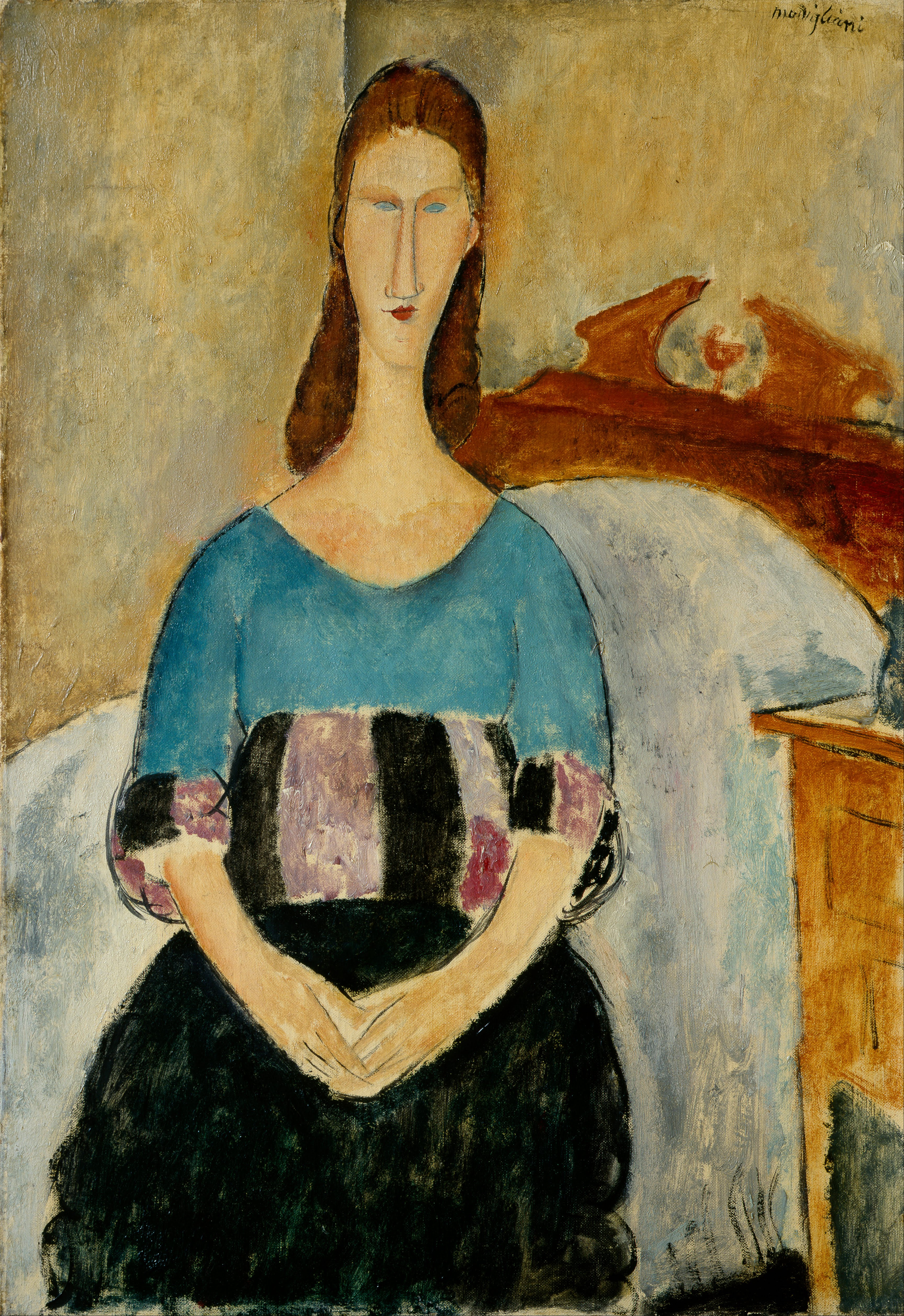
1918
