= Chaïm Soutine =

French, Jewish Belarusian painter (1893–1943)

- Soutine (with signature)
- Born: Chaim-Itzke Solomonovich Sutin (Хаим-Ицке Соломонович Сутин); 13 January 1893; Smilavichy, Minsk Governorate, Russian Empire (now Belarus)
- Died: 9 August 1943 (aged 50); Paris, France
- Education: Vilna Academy of Fine Arts; École des Beaux-Arts; Fernand Cormon
- Known for: Painting
- Movement: École de Paris, Expressionism
- Patrons: Albert C. Barnes; Léopold Zborowski

Signature
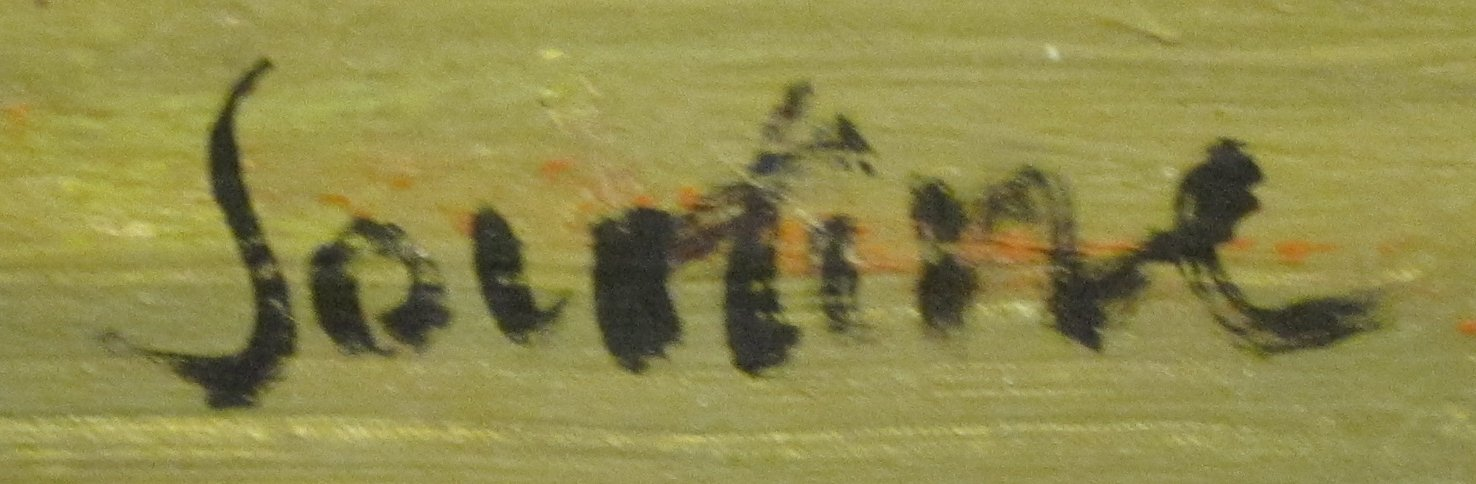

Chaïm Soutine (French: [ʃaim sutin]; Russian: Хаим Соломонович Сутин, romanized: Khaim Solomonovich Sutin; Yiddish: חײם סוטין, romanized: Chaim Sutin; 13 January 1893 – 9 August 1943) was a French painter of Belarusian-Jewish origin of the School of Paris, who made a major contribution to the Expressionist movement while living and working in Paris.

Inspired by classic painting in the European tradition, exemplified by the works of Rembrandt, Chardin and Courbet, Soutine developed an individual style more concerned with shape, color, and texture than representation, which served as a bridge between more traditional approaches and the developing form of Abstract Expressionism.

== Early life ==
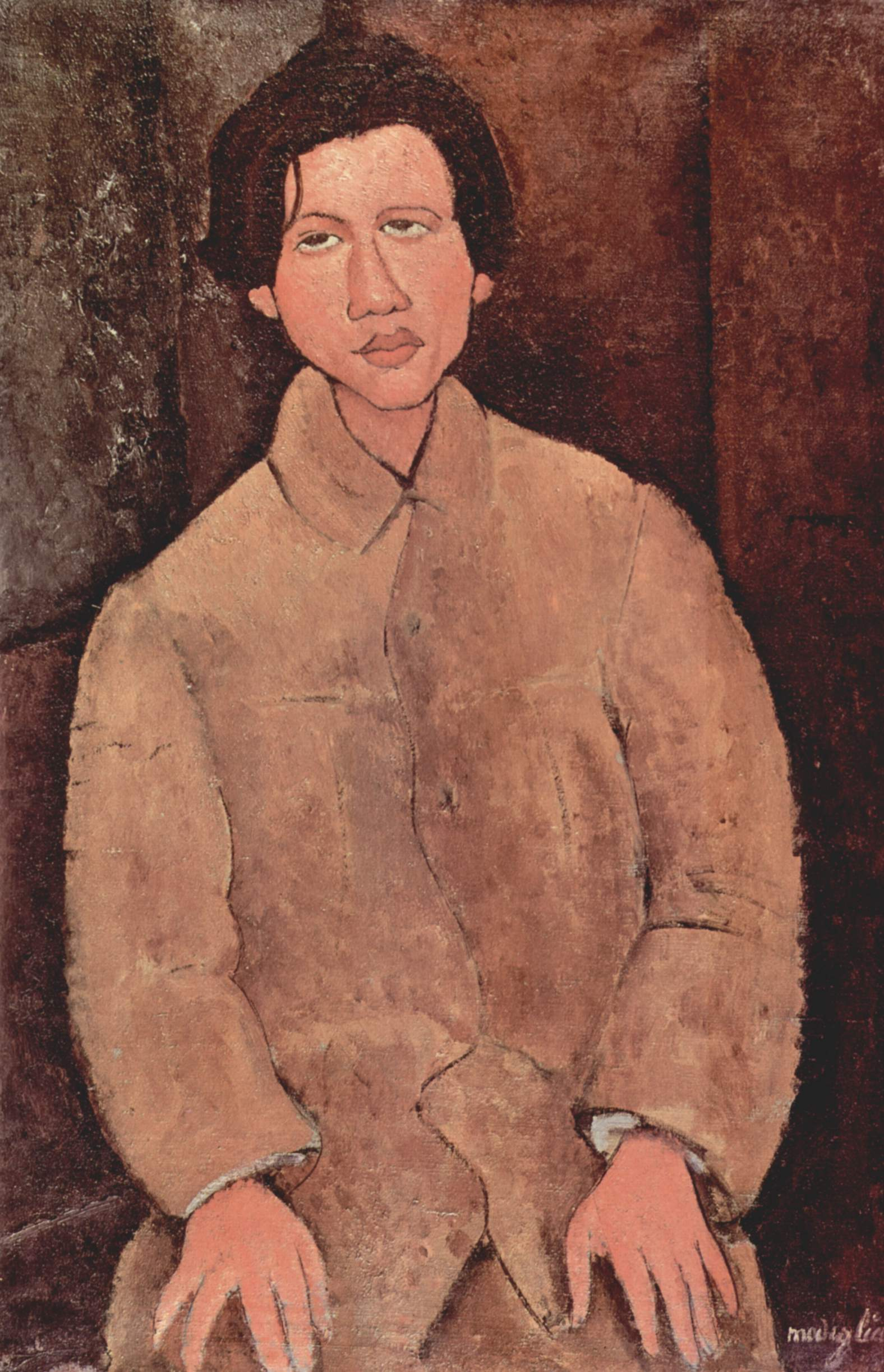
Amedeo Modigliani, Portrait of Soutine, 1916

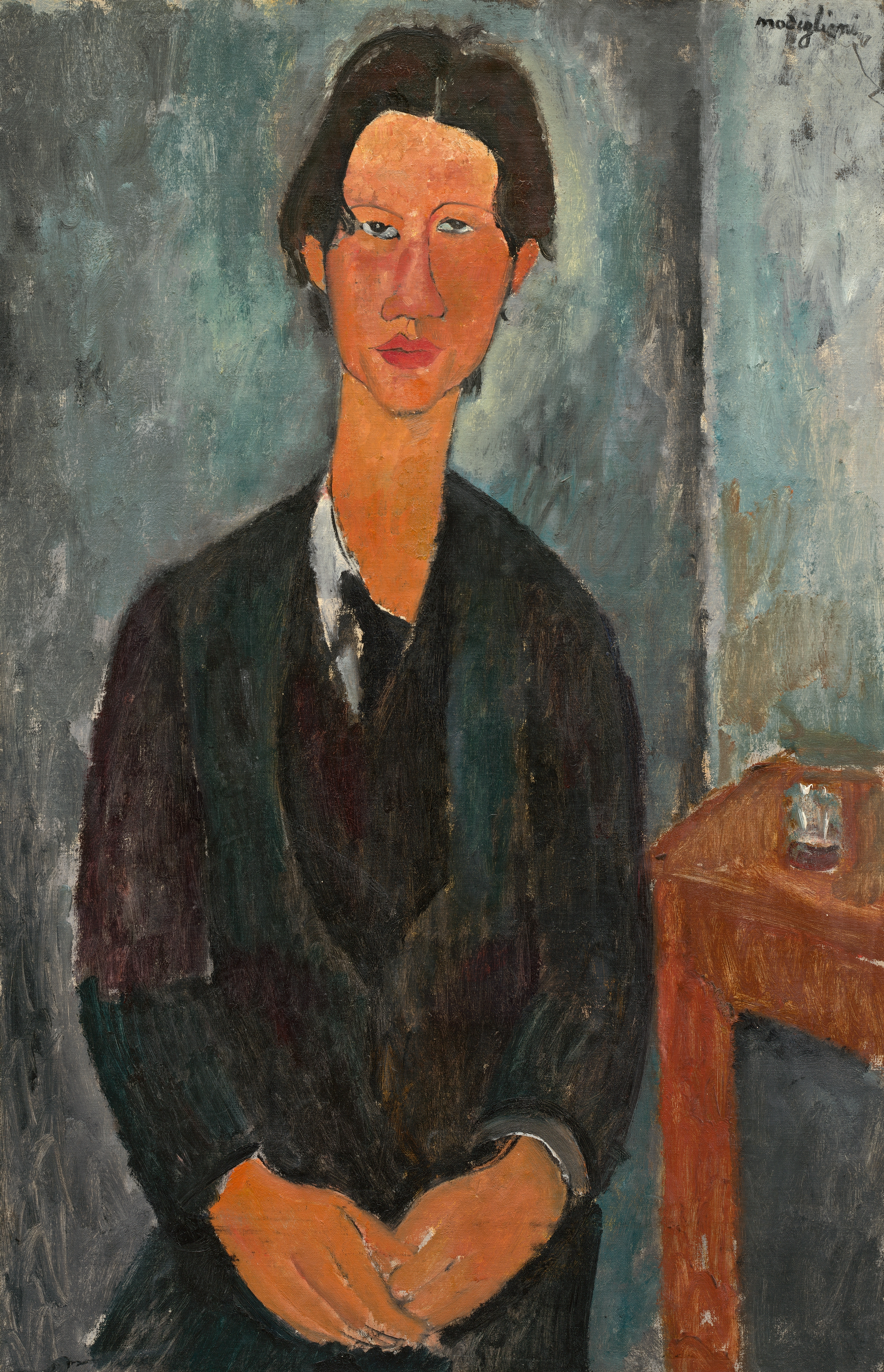
Amedeo Modigliani, Chaim Soutine, 1917, National Gallery of Art

Soutine was born Chaim-Iche Solomonovich Sutin, in Smilavichy (Yiddish: סמילאָוויץ, romanized: Smilovitz) in the Minsk Governorate of the Russian Empire (present-day Belarus). He was Jewish and the 10th of 11 children born to parents Zalman (also reported as Solomon and Salomon) Moiseevich Sutin (1858–1932) and Sarah Sutina (née Khlamovna) (died in 1938). From 1910 to 1913 he studied in Vilnius at a small art Academy. In 1913, with his friends Pinchus Krémègne and Michel Kikoine, he emigrated to Paris, where he studied at the École des Beaux-Arts under Fernand Cormon. He soon developed a highly personal vision and painting technique.

== Arrival in Paris ==
=== La Ruche and Montparnasse ===
For a time, he and his friends lived at La Ruche, a residence for struggling artists in Montparnasse in Paris. Since 1900, the Montparnasse district, popularized by Apollinaire, had supplanted Montmartre as the epicenter of an intellectual and artistic life in Paris. It was the meeting place of writers, painters, sculptors, and actors, often struggling financially, who exchanged and created art and literature whilst sitting and chatting in cafes.

La Ruche — whose rotunda stands on Dantzig Passage in the 15th arrondissement, not far from Montparnasse, a cosmopolitan commune where painters and sculptors from all over, many from Eastern Europe — rented small studios at a low cost. There, Soutine encountered, among others, Archipenko, Zadkine, Brancusi, Chapiro, Kisling, Epstein, Chagall, Nina Niss-Goldman, Chana Orloff, as well as Lipchitz who introduced Amadeo Modigliani to Soutine.

The two became friends. Modigliani painted Soutine's portrait several times, most famously in 1917, on a door of an apartment belonging to Léopold Zborowski, who was their art dealer. Until he acquired his own studio, he slept and worked at various places, including that of Krémègne and Kikoïne, fellow Jewish painters of the School of Paris. His poverty was such that he even slept in stairways and on benches.

Upon his arrival in Paris, Soutine eagerly immersed himself in his exploration of the French capital. "In a filthy hole like Smilovitchi," he claimed, where, he also said, they are unaware of the existence of a piano, "one cannot imagine that there are cities like Paris, or music like that of Bach." As soon as he has a few pennies in his pocket, he would spend them in order to "immerse himself" in music at Colonne or Lamoureux concerts, with a preference for Baroque music. He haunted the galleries of the Louvre, either hugging the walls or jumping at the slightest approach, and contemplated for hours his favorite painters: "If he loves Fouquet, Raphael, Chardin, and Ingres, it is especially in the works of Goya and Courbet, and more than any other, in those of Rembrandt, that Soutine recognizes himself." Chana Orloff recounted that, seized by a "respectful fear" in front of a Rembrandt, he could also go into ecstasy and exclaim, "It's so beautiful that it drives me mad!".

Soutine took French lessons, often in the back of La Rotonde, managed at the time by Victor Libion. Libion, who acted as a sort of artists' patron, allowed artists to warm up from the cold in La Rotonde and discuss for hours without requiring them to make additional purchases. After learning French, Soutine — an avid reader of Russian novels — also began to enthusiastically read and immerse himself in French literature, reading Balzac, Baudelaire, and Rimbaud, and later, Montaigne.

Zborowski supported Soutine through World War I, taking the struggling artist with him to Nice to escape the possible German invasion of Paris.

== The Interwar period ==
After the war Paul Guillaume, a highly influential art dealer, began to champion Soutine's work. In 1923, in a showing arranged by Guillaume, the prominent American collector Albert C. Barnes, bought 60 of Soutine's paintings on the spot. Soutine, who had been virtually penniless in his years in Paris, immediately took the money, ran into the street, hailed a Paris taxi, and ordered the driver to take him to Nice, on the French Riviera, more than 400 miles away.

Élie Faure, who was called "the greatest art critic of the 1920s and 30s ... shared a brief and almost romantically intense friendship" with Soutine". Faure said, "Soutine is one of the rare religious painters the world has known because Soutine's material is one of the most carnal that painting has expressed".

=== Céret ===
Soutine lived for several years in Le Midi, initially between Vence and Cagnes-sur-Mer; he then abandoned the French Riviera for the Pyrénées-Orientales in 1919, specifically for Céret. Regardless of his frequent trips to Paris—particularly in October 1919 to obtain his identity card, mandatory for foreigners—he changed residences and studios several times. One of his places of residence was the Maison Laverny, 5 rue de l'hôpital (rue Pierre Rameil). There Soutine was nicknamed by the locals as "el pintre brut" ("the dirty painter"), due to his miserable living conditions on allowances from Zborowski.

During a visit to Le Midi, Zborowski wrote to a friend regarding Soutine: "He gets up at three in the morning, walks twenty kilometers loaded with canvases and colors to find a site he likes, and goes back to bed forgetting to eat. But he unfastens his canvas and, having spread it on the one from the day before, he falls asleep next to it" Soutine indeed only owned one canvas. The locals took pity at times and at times sympathized with the painter. Soutine painted portraits of the locals, in his works alluding to certain famous series such as those of men in prayer or pastry chefs and café boys, whom he represented facing forward, their working hands often disproportionately depicted. Between 1920 and 1922, he painted around 200 canvases there.

Although Soutine eventually grew to dislike the place and the works he created there, this period is generally considered a key stage in the evolution of his art. Soutine's art at the period is no longer hesitant; here, he "inject[ed] his own emotions into the subjects and figures of his paintings." Especially, he imparted extreme deformations to the landscapes, carrying them away in a "rotary movement" already perceived by Waldemar-George in still lifes: under the pressure of internal forces that seem to compress them, the forms spring forth twisting, and the masses rise "as if caught in a maelstrom" as described by Jover.

==== Carcass paintings ====
Soutine once horrified his neighbors by keeping an animal carcass in his studio so that he could paint it (Carcass of Beef). The stench drove them to send for the police, whom Soutine promptly lectured on the relative importance of art over hygiene. There is a story that Marc Chagall saw the blood from the carcass leak out onto the corridor outside Soutine's room, and rushed out screaming, "Someone has killed Soutine." Soutine painted 10 works in this series, which have since become his most well-known. His carcass paintings such as The Flayed Ox were inspired by Rembrandt's still life of the same subject, Slaughtered Ox, which he discovered while studying the Old Masters in the Louvre.

Soutine produced the majority of his works from 1920 to 1929. From 1930 to 1935, the interior designer Madeleine Castaing and her husband welcomed him to their summer home, the mansion of Lèves, becoming his patrons, so that Soutine could hold his first exhibition in Chicago in 1935. He seldom showed his works, but he did take part in the important exhibition The Origins and Development of International Independent Art held at the Galerie nationale du Jeu de Paume in 1937 in Paris, where he was at last hailed as a great painter.

==== Between Paris and Le Midi ====
By 1926, five of Soutine's paintings were sold at Drouot for amounts ranging from 10,000 to 22,000 francs. However, this did not prevent him from boycotting the opening in June 1927 of the first exhibition of his works by Henri Bing in Bing's gallery on Rue La Boétie. On the other hand, he reportedly eagerly accepted the opportunity to create set designs for a ballet by Diaghilev—a project that never materialized due to the sudden death of the impresario in 1929.

== German invasion ==
Soon afterwards France was invaded by German troops. As a Jew, Soutine had to escape from the French capital and hide to avoid arrest by the Gestapo. From the beginning of 1941, he moved from one place to another and was sometimes forced to seek shelter in forests, sleeping outdoors. Leaving his companion Marie-Berthe Aurenche's home on Littré Street, he sought refuge on Rue des Plants, where she had friends, the painter Marcel Laloë and his wife. Fearing denunciation by their caretaker, they later assisted in the couple's escape, with fake documents, to a village in Indre-et-Loire, Champigny-sur-Veude. Expelled from several inns where their untidiness or Marie-Berthe's outbursts were criticized, the couple eventually found a house for rent on the way to Chinon, where friends discreetly visited them.

There, despite intense stomach pains that soon forced him to subsist solely on porridge, the painter resumed his work, supplied with canvases and colors by the painter Marcel Laloë. The landscapes from the years 1941–1942 seem to have abandoned warm tones, such as the Landscape of Champigny. The Big Tree, painted in Richelieu, strained Soutine's relationship with the Castaings as he reduced the canvas size before delivering it to them. However, he also tackled new and lighter subjects like The Pigs or The Return from School after the Storm. He also created portraits of children and more serene maternity scenes.

== Illness and death ==
Suffering from a stomach ulcer and bleeding badly, Soutine left a safe hiding place for Paris for emergency surgery, which failed to save his life. On 9 August 1943, he died of a perforated ulcer. He was interred in Cimetière du Montparnasse, Paris.

== Art market ==
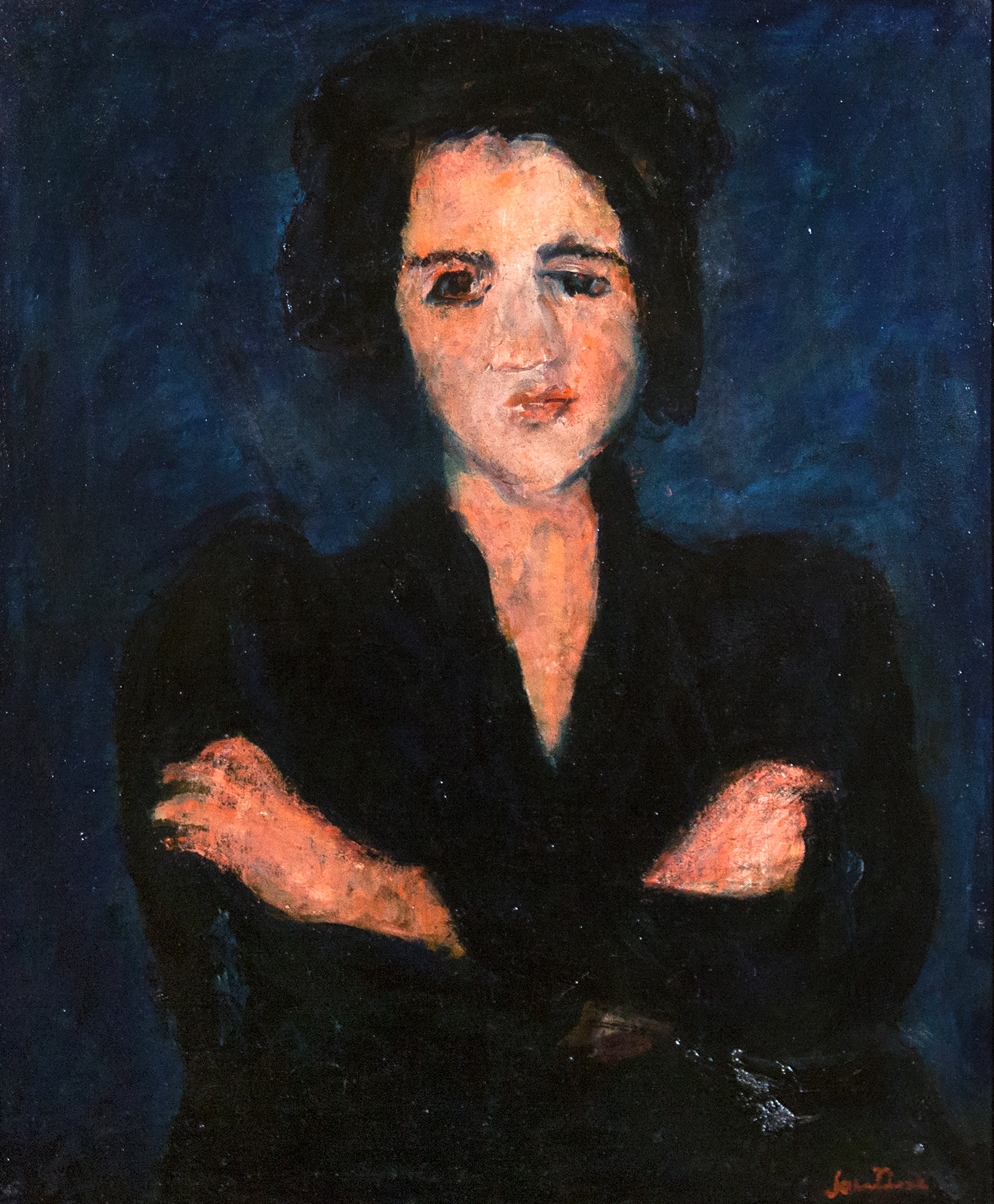
Eva

In February 2006, an oil painting of his controversial and iconic series Le Bœuf Écorché (1924) sold for a record £7.8 million ($13.8 million) to an anonymous buyer at a Christie's auction held in London—after it was estimated to fetch £4.8 million. In February 2007, a 1921 portrait of an unidentified man with a red scarf (L'Homme au Foulard Rouge) sold for $17.2 million—a new record—at Sotheby's London auction house.

One of the beef paintings, known as Le bœuf, circa 1923, was sold for $1 million in 2004 and resold six months later for twice that price to the National Gallery of Art in Washington, D.C. Heirs of the first seller sued to have the painting returned, claiming the price was unfairly low, and a complex settlement in 2009 required the painting to be transferred to them. In May 2015, Le Bœuf achieved a record price for the artist of $28,165,000 at the Christie's curated auction Looking forward to the past.

== Legacy ==
Roald Dahl placed him as a character in his 1952 short story "Skin".

The Jewish Museum in New York has presented major exhibitions of Soutine's work in An Expressionist in Paris: The Paintings of Chaim Soutine (1998) and Chaim Soutine: Flesh (2018).

In 2019, the Mishkan Museum of Art in Israel held a show called "Naked Soul: Chaim Soutine and Israeli Art," that included 18 original Soutine paintings.

In 2020, Soutine's painting Eva became a symbol of pro-democracy protests in Belarus.

In 2023 Louisiana Channel og Louisiana Museum of Modern Art asked the seven contemporary artist Dana Schutz, Amy Sillman, Emma Talbot, Leidy Churchman, Thomas Hirschhorn, Chantal Joffe, and Imran Qureshi, to give their views on Chaïm Soutine and his work in the film A World in Flux - Seven Artists on Chaïm Soutine

== Artistic style ==
"Expression is in the touch" declared Soutine, meaning expression is found in the movement in the rhythm and the passion applied by the pencil against the surface of the canvas. It is said Soutine rapidly moved from linear and rigid drawing of his still life in order to discover "his true element, the touch of color and its sinuous bending".

== Gallery ==
Portraits and figures

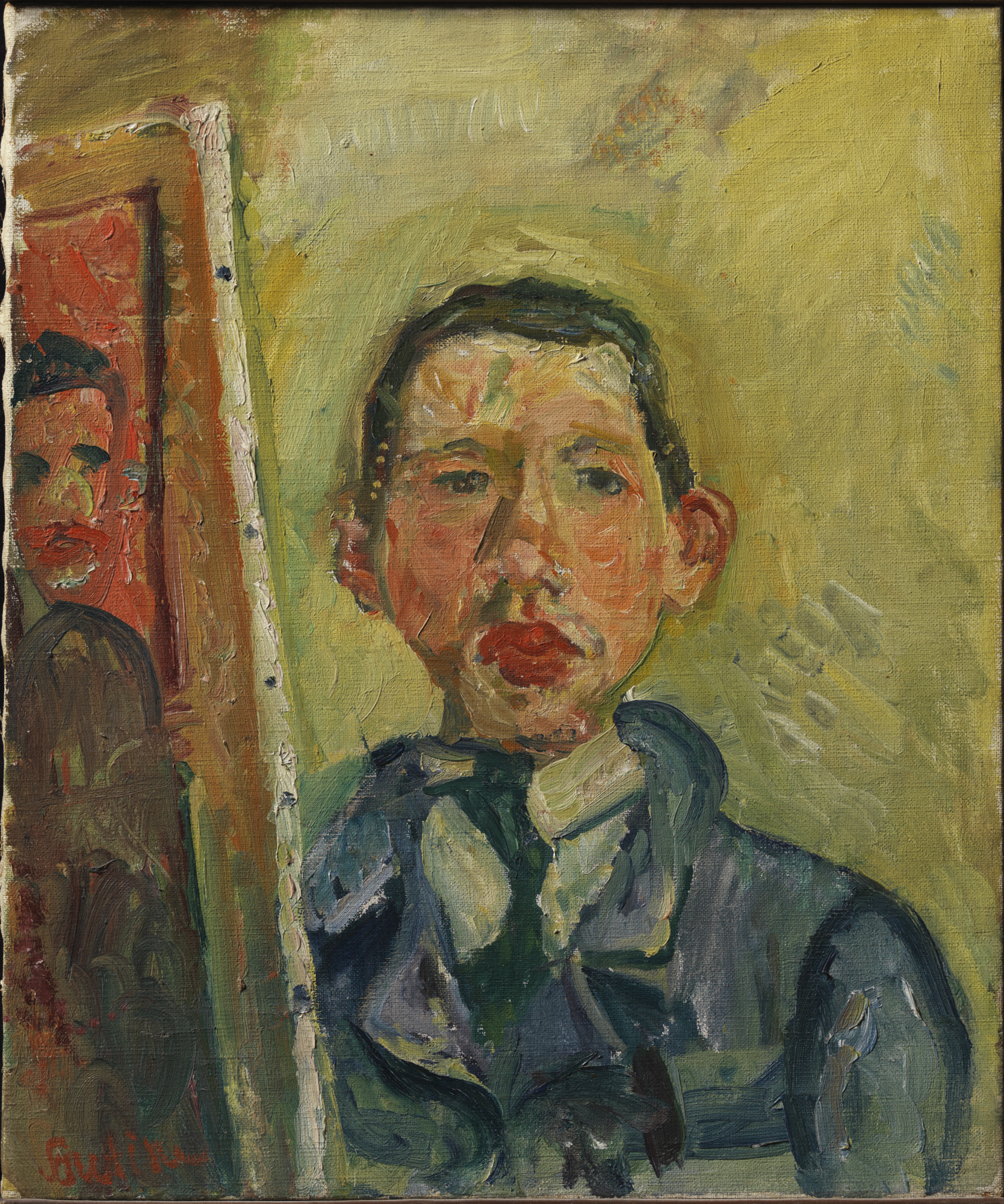
Self Portrait (1918) oil on canvas, 21.5 × 18 in., Henry and Rose Pearlman Collection, on long-term loan to the Princeton University Art Museum

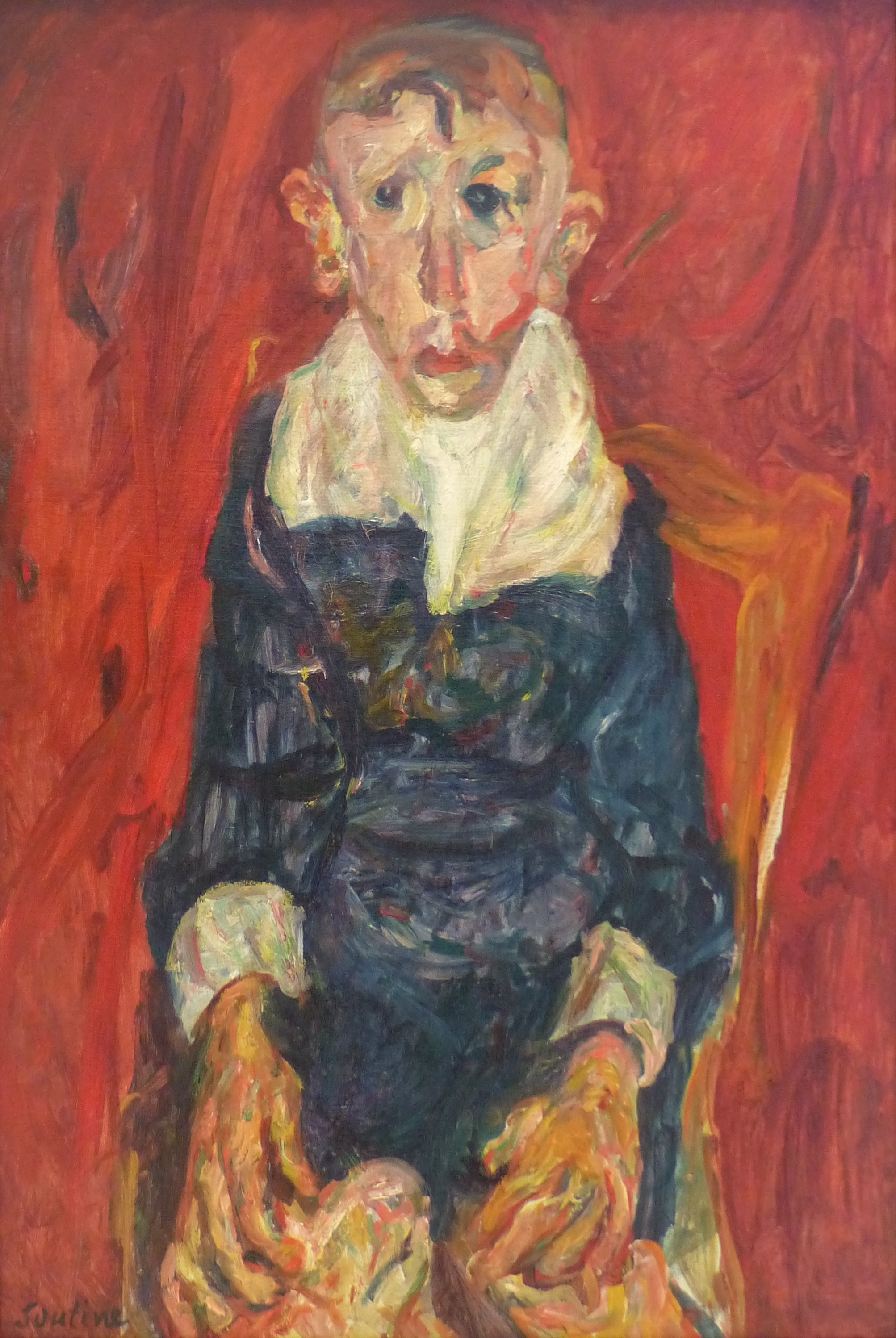
The Idiot (c. 1920) oil on canvas, 36.2 × 25.5 in., Calvet Museum, Avignon

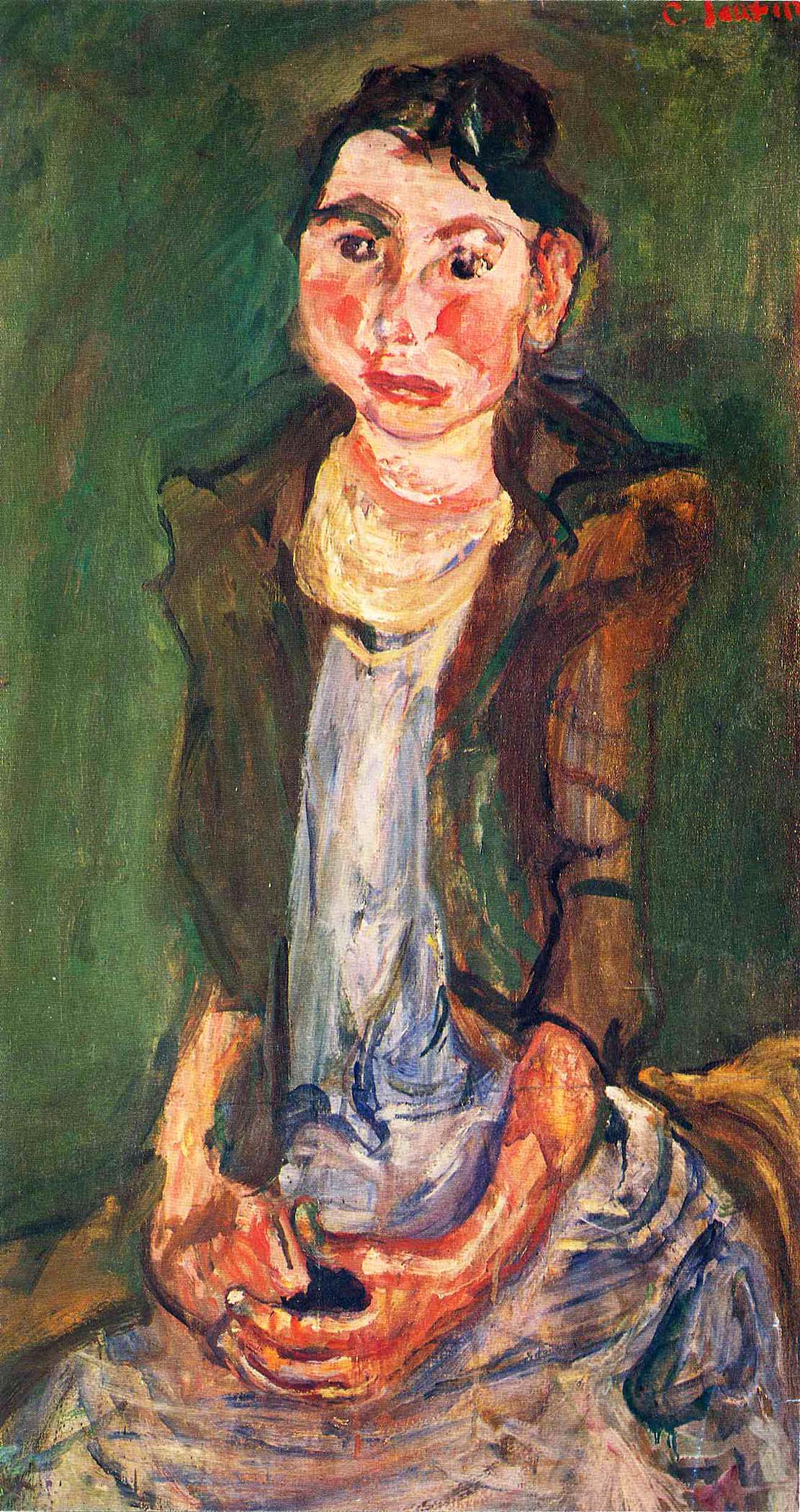
Farm Girl (1922) oil on canvas, 31.5 × 17.5 in., Nagoya City Art Museum, Nagoya

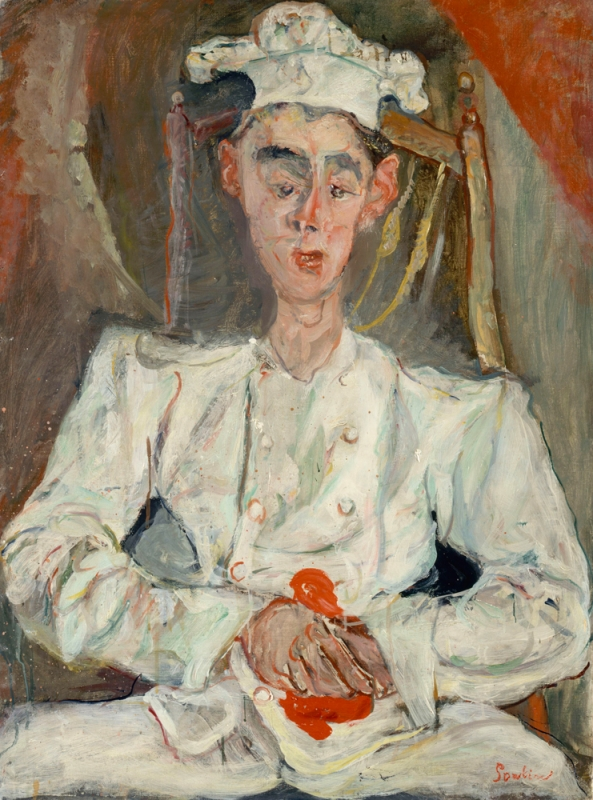
The Little Pastry Chef (1922–23) oil on canvas, 73 × 54 cm, Musée de l'Orangerie, Paris

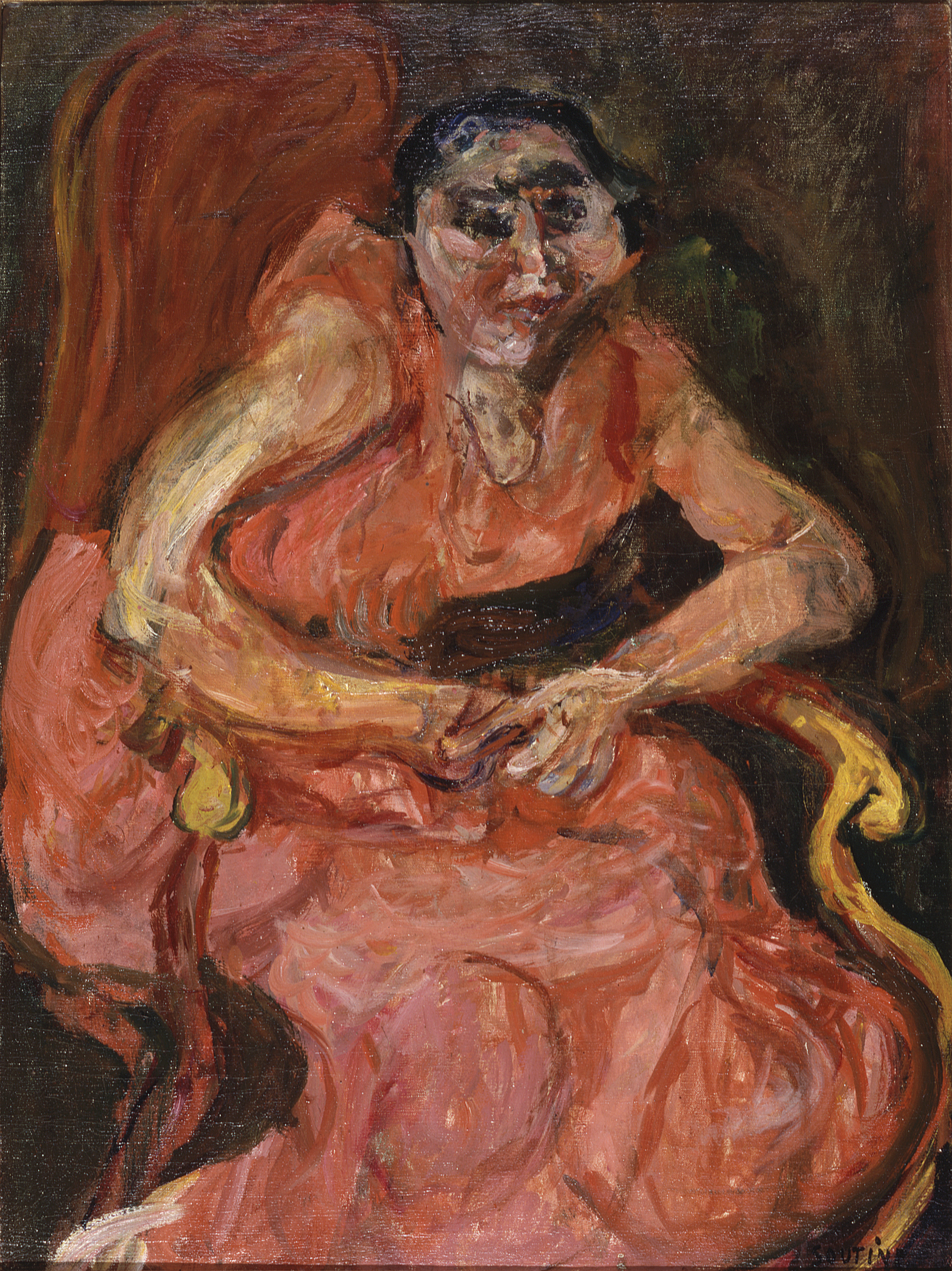
Woman in Pink (c. 1924) oil on canvas, 73 × 54.3 cm., Saint Louis Art Museum

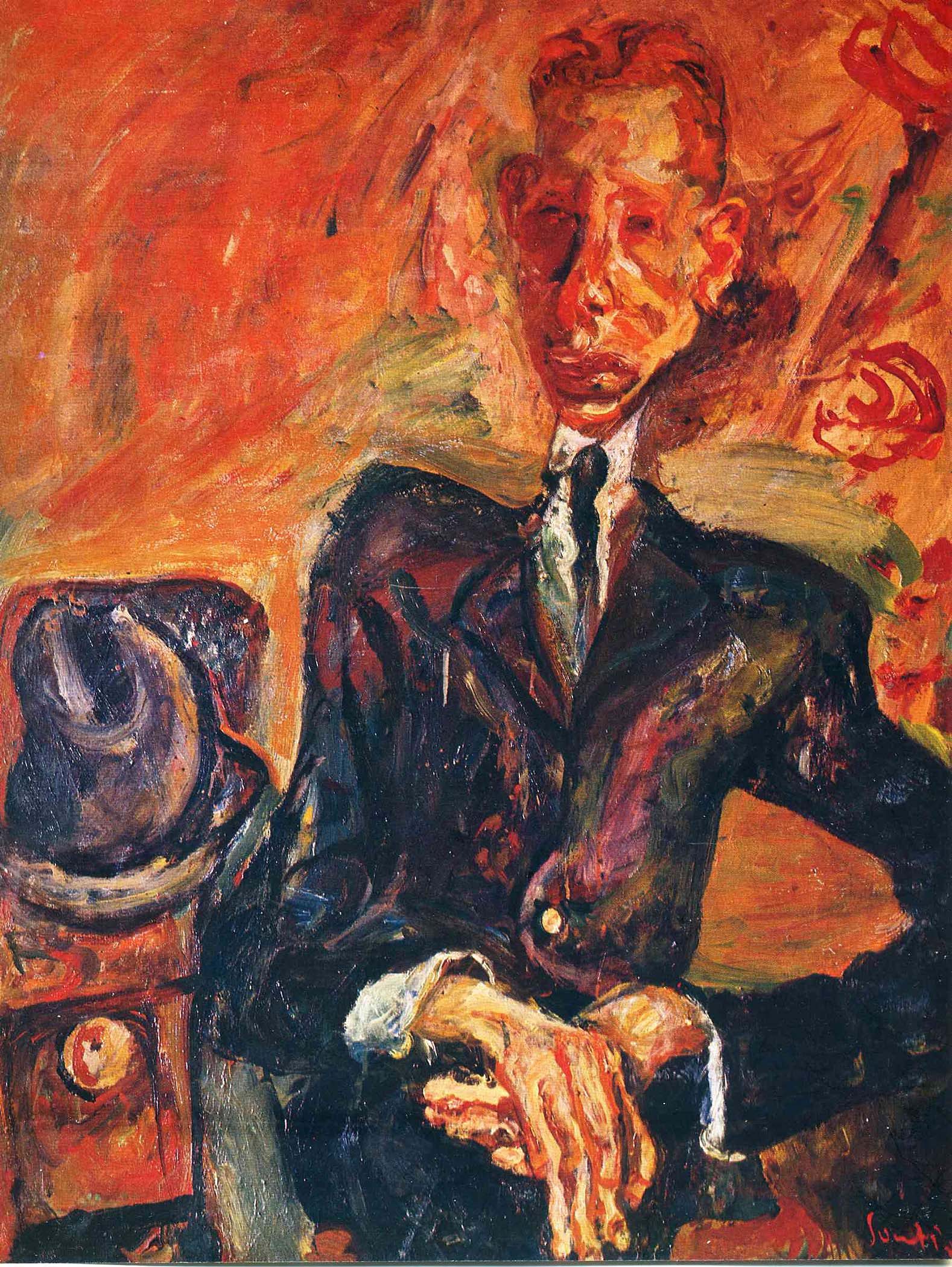
Portrait Of A Man With A Felt Hat (1924) oil on canvas, 36 × 28 in., collection unknown

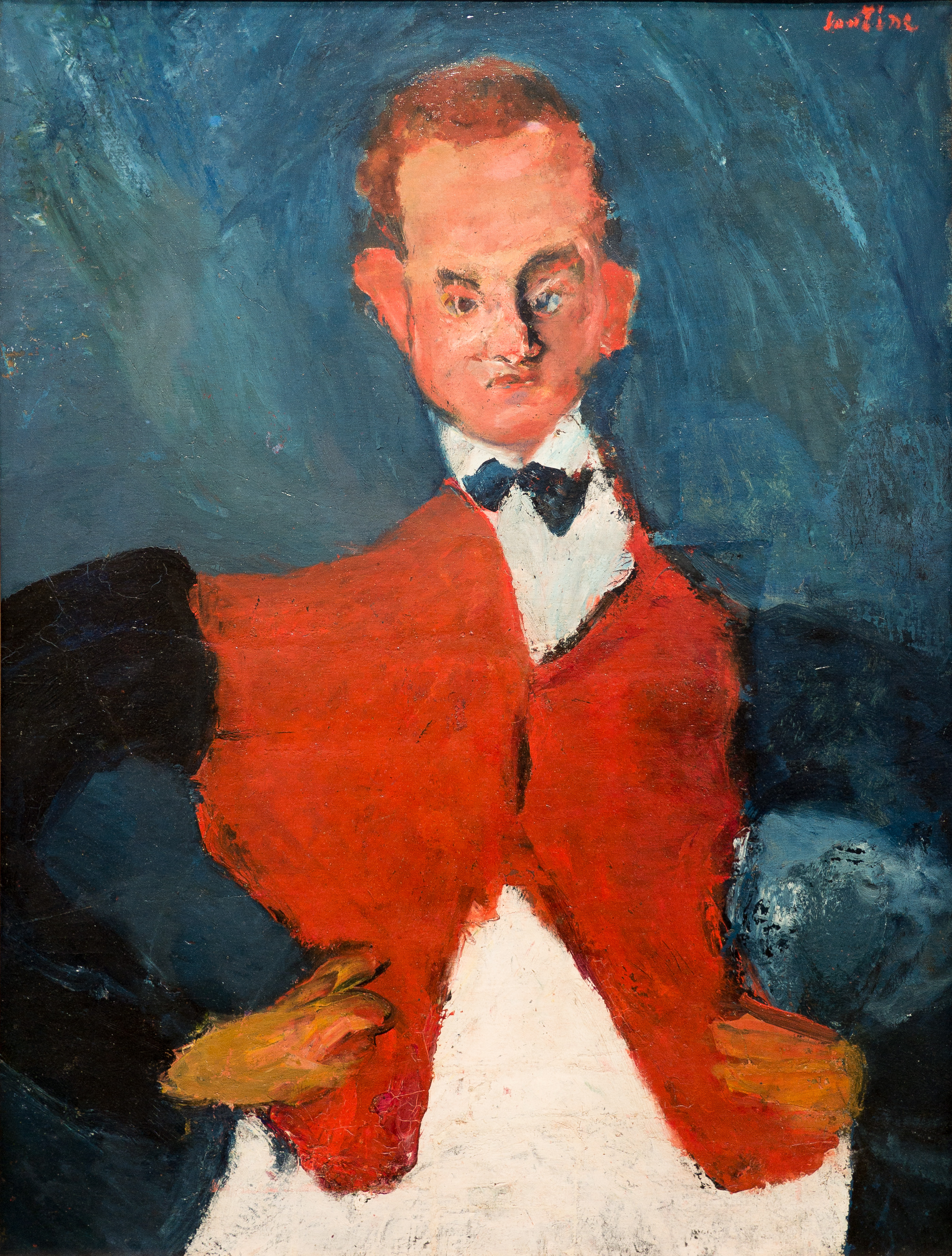
The Floor Waiter (Le Garçon d'étage) (1927) Collection Musée de l'Orangerie, Paris

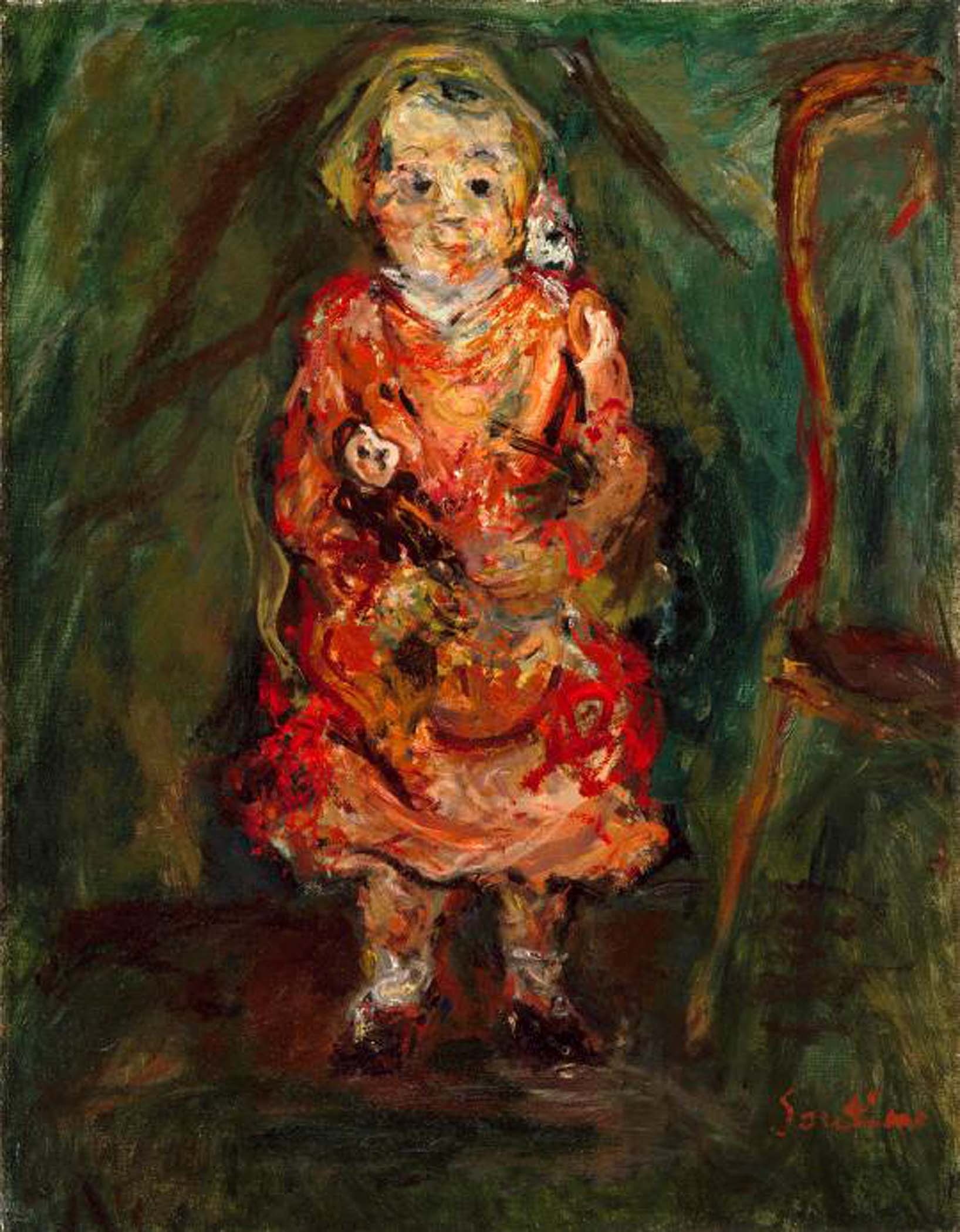
Young Girl with a Doll (1926–1927) oil on canvas, 25.5 × 19.5 in., Museum of Fine Arts, Houston

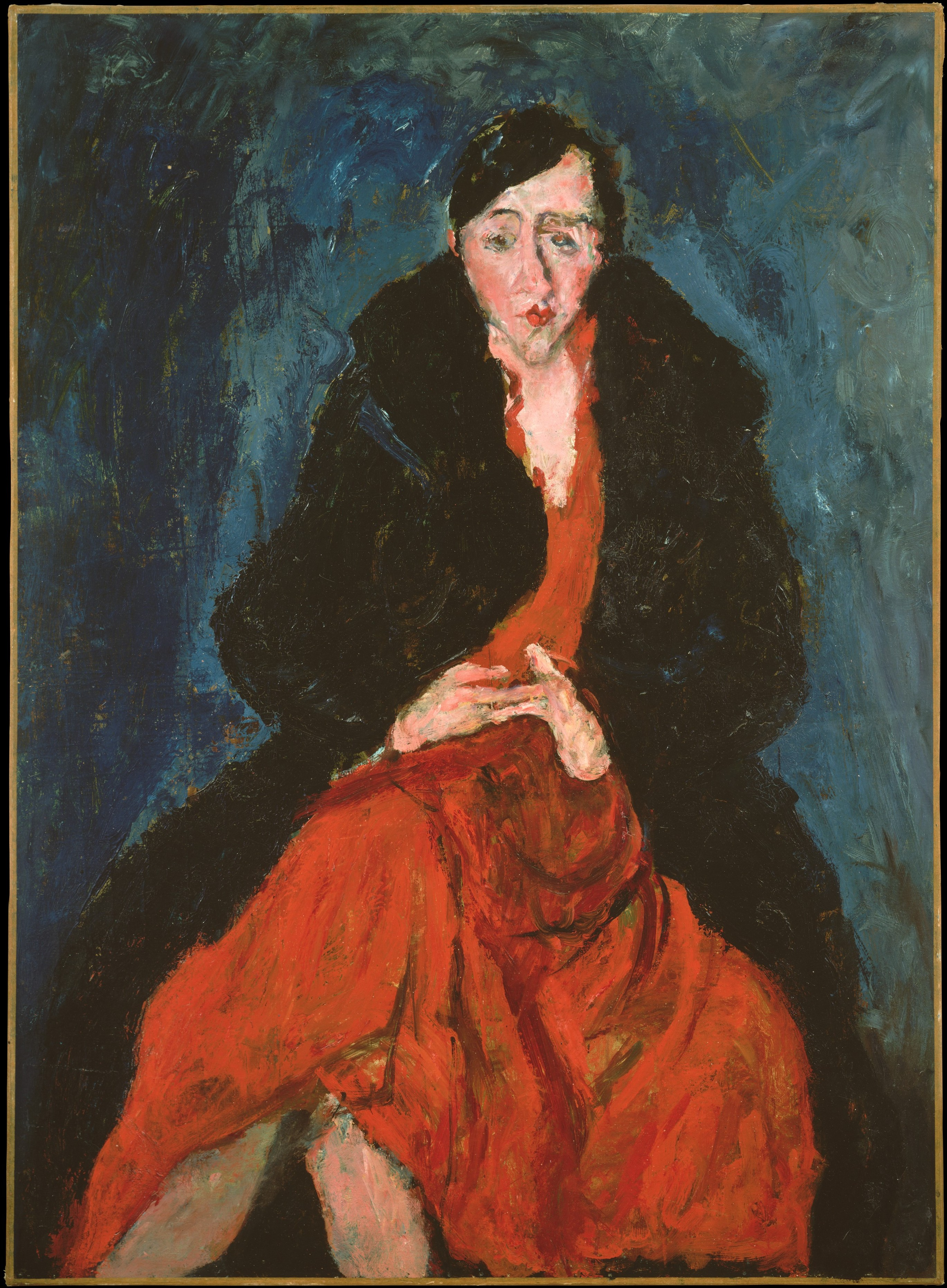
Portrait of Madeleine Castaing (c. 1929) oil on canvas, 100 × 73 cm., Metropolitan Museum of Art, New York

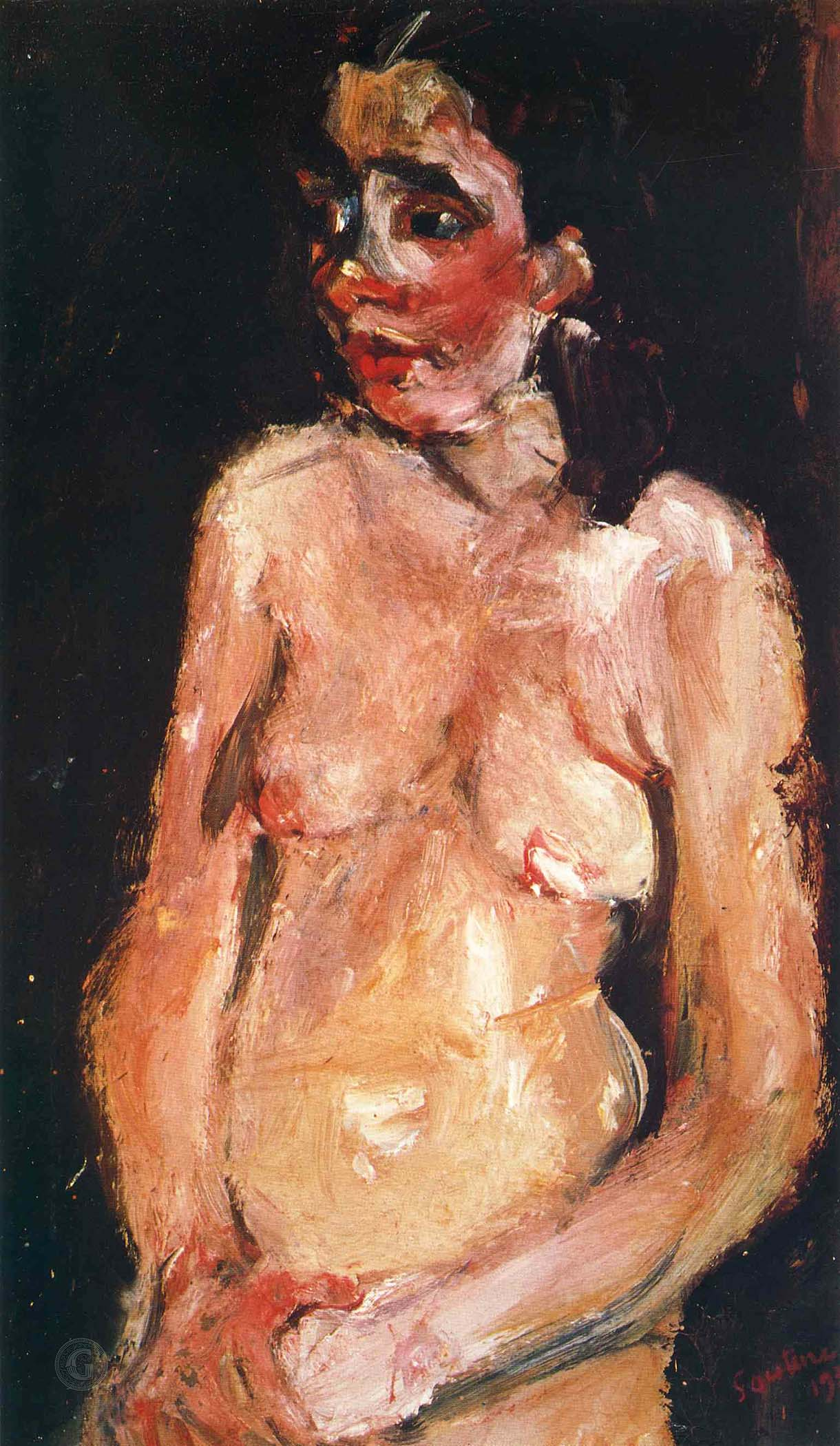
Female Nude (1933) oil on canvas, 18 × 10.5 in., collection unknown

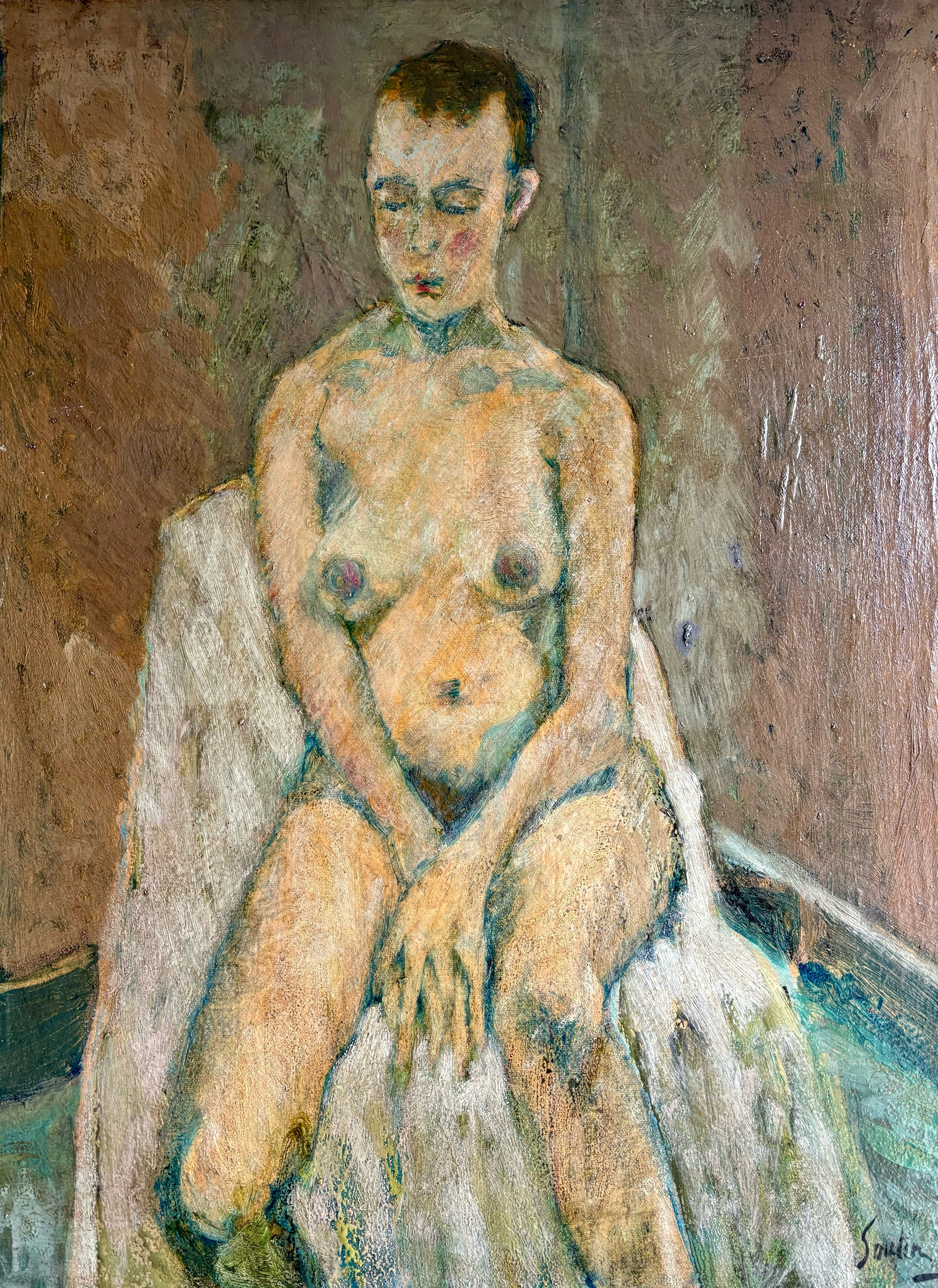
Female Nude (1936) oil on canvas, 65 × 55 cm., collection unknown

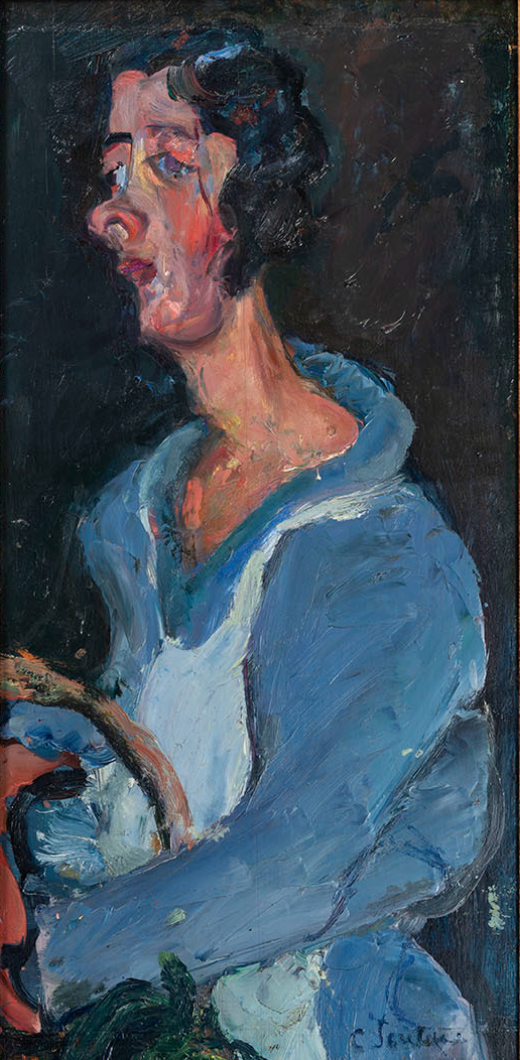
The Cook (Women in Blue) (c. 1935) oil on canvas, Museo Botero

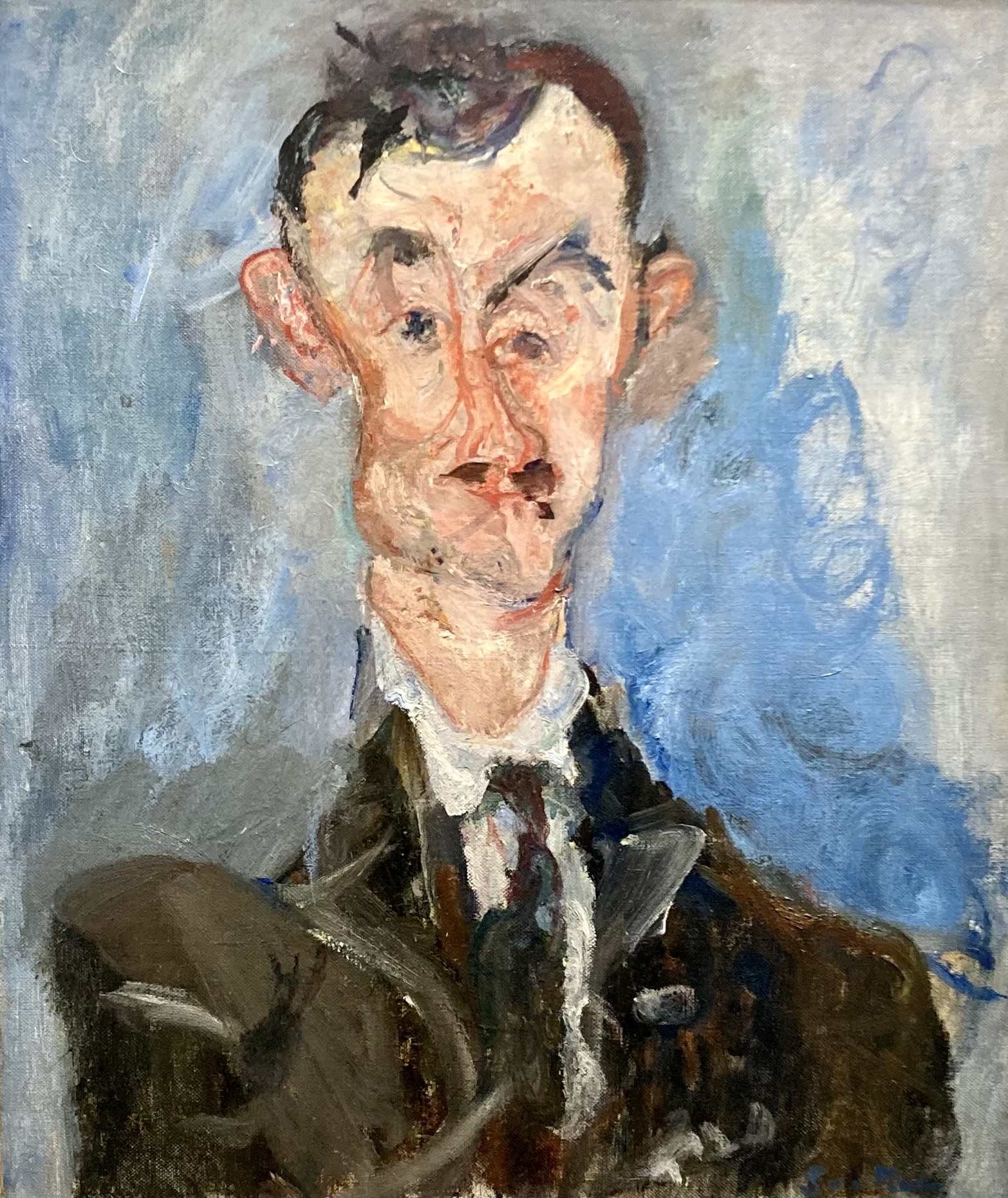
Portrait d'homme (Èmile Lejeune) (1922–1923), Musée de l'Orangerie

Still Lifes

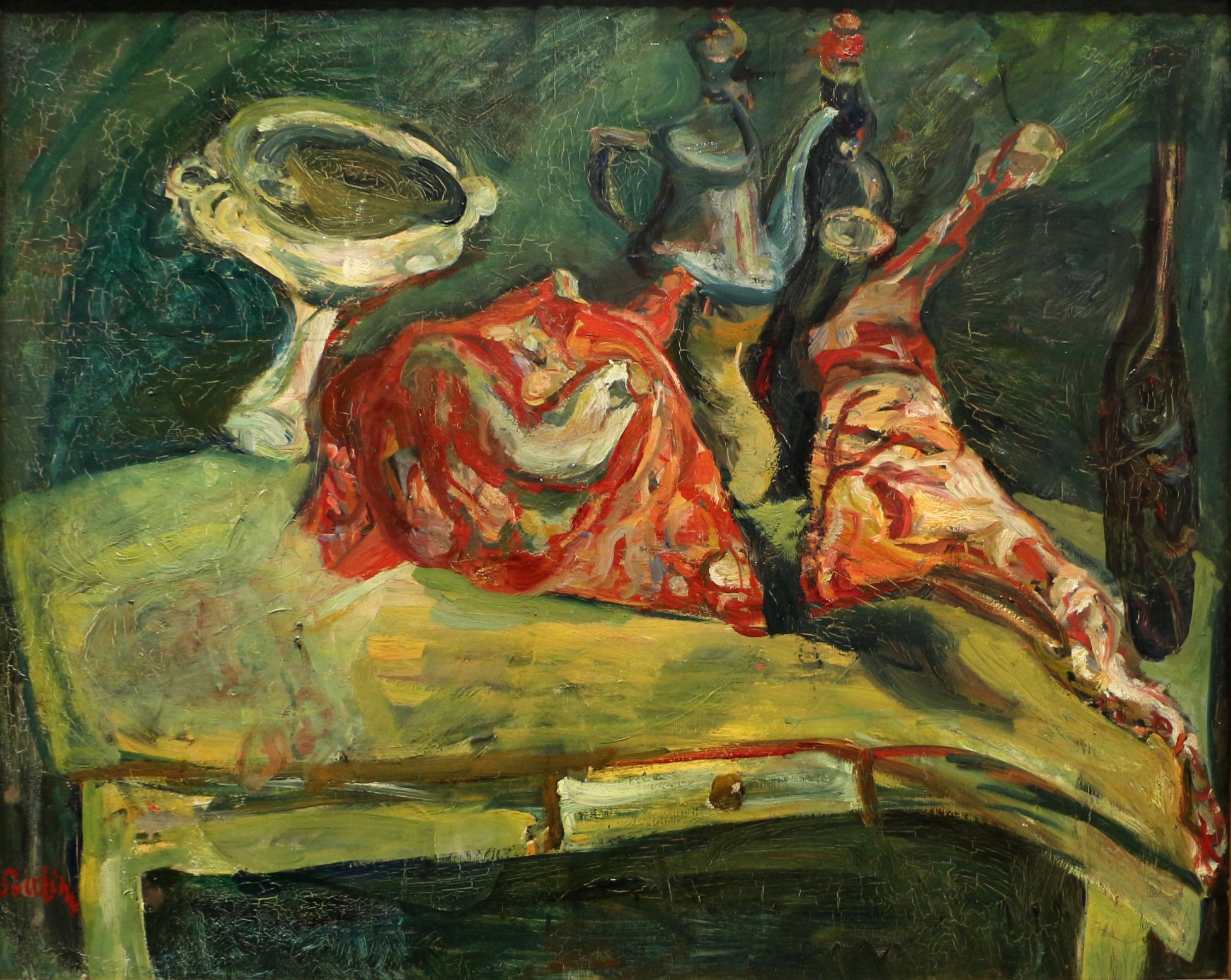
The Table (c. 1923) oil on canvas, 35.8 x 39.3 in., Musée de l'Orangerie, Paris

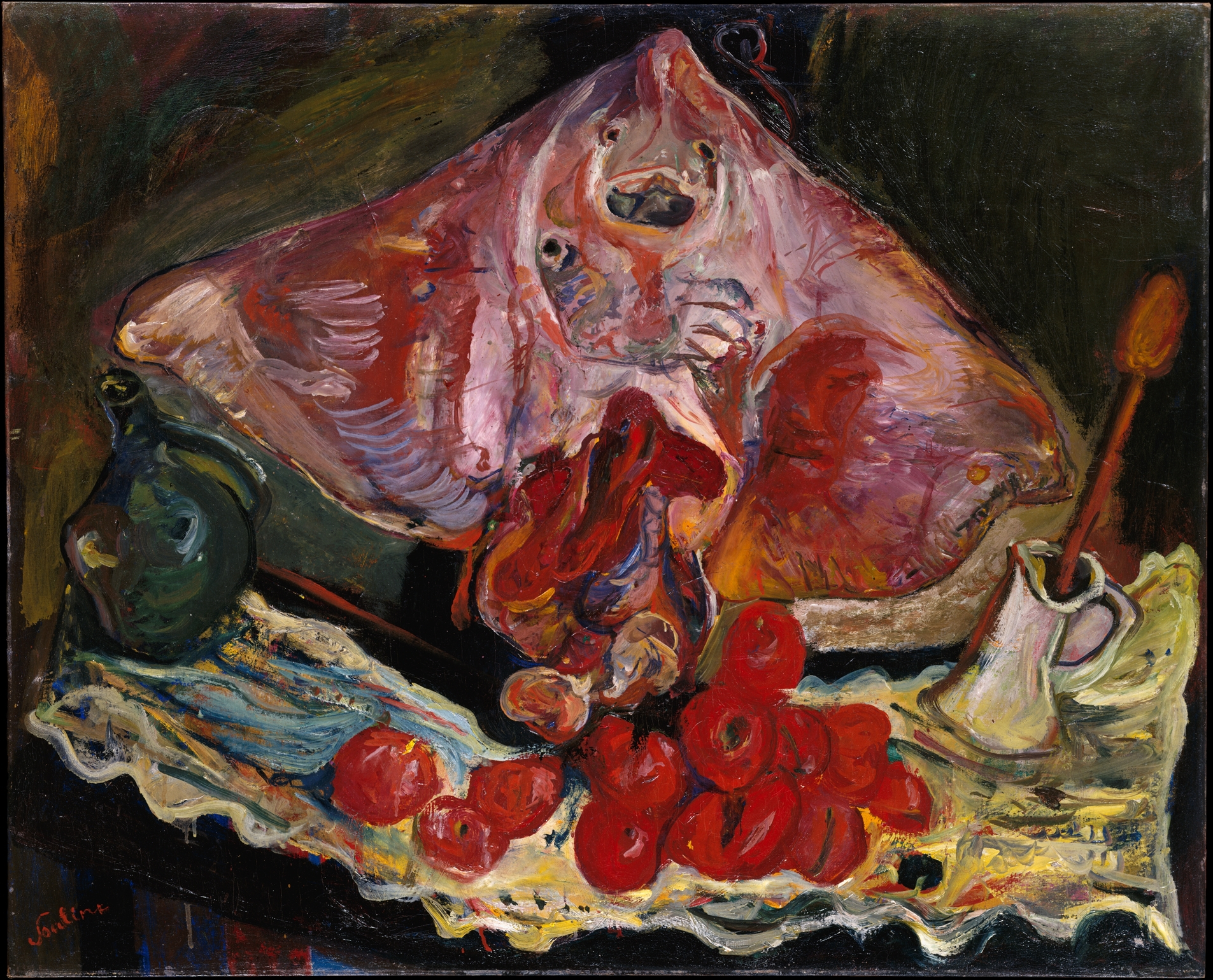
Still Life with Rayfish (c. 1924) oil on canvas, 32 × 39.5 in., Metropolitan Museum of Art, New York

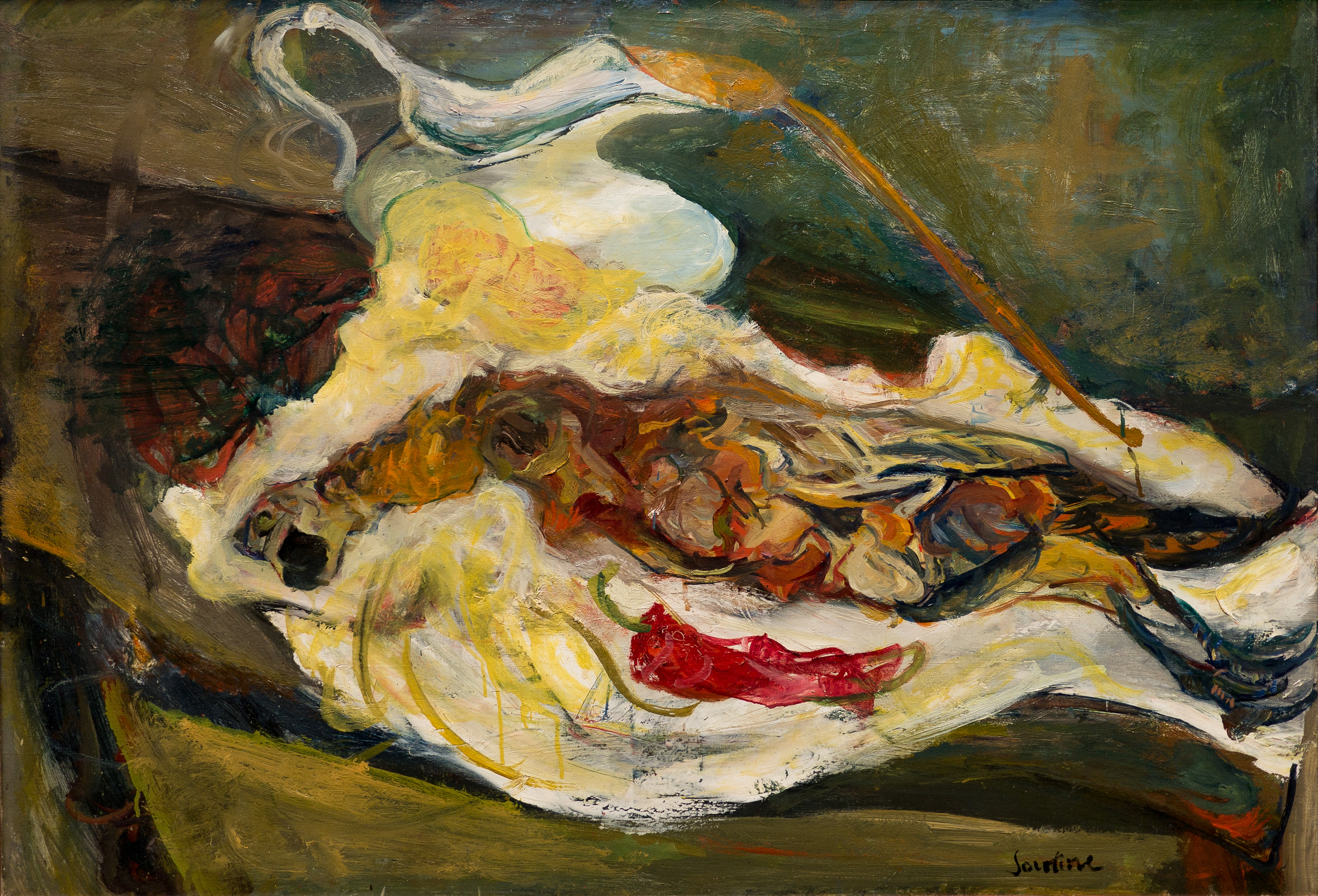
Still life with Pheasant (c. 1924) oil on canvas, dimensions unknown, Musée de l'Orangerie, Paris

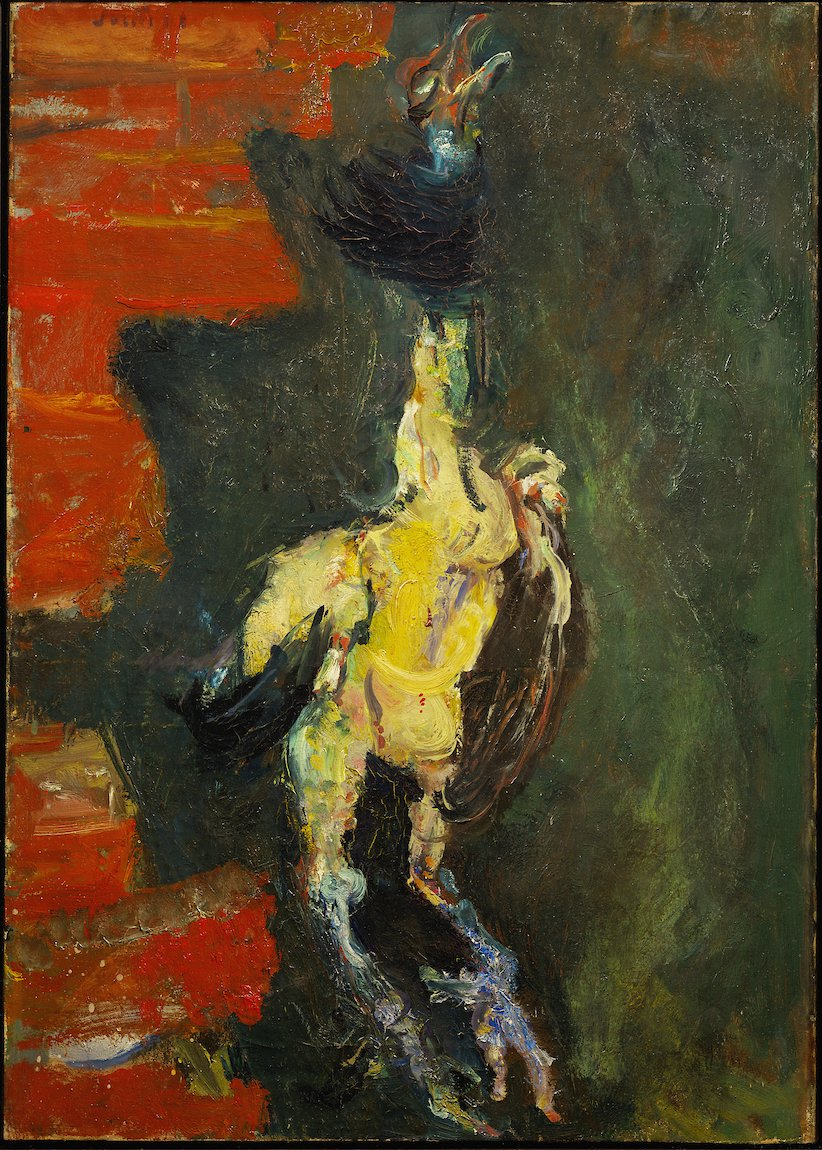
Chicken Hung Before a Brick Wall (1925) oil on canvas, dimensions unknown, Kunstmuseum Bern, Switzerland

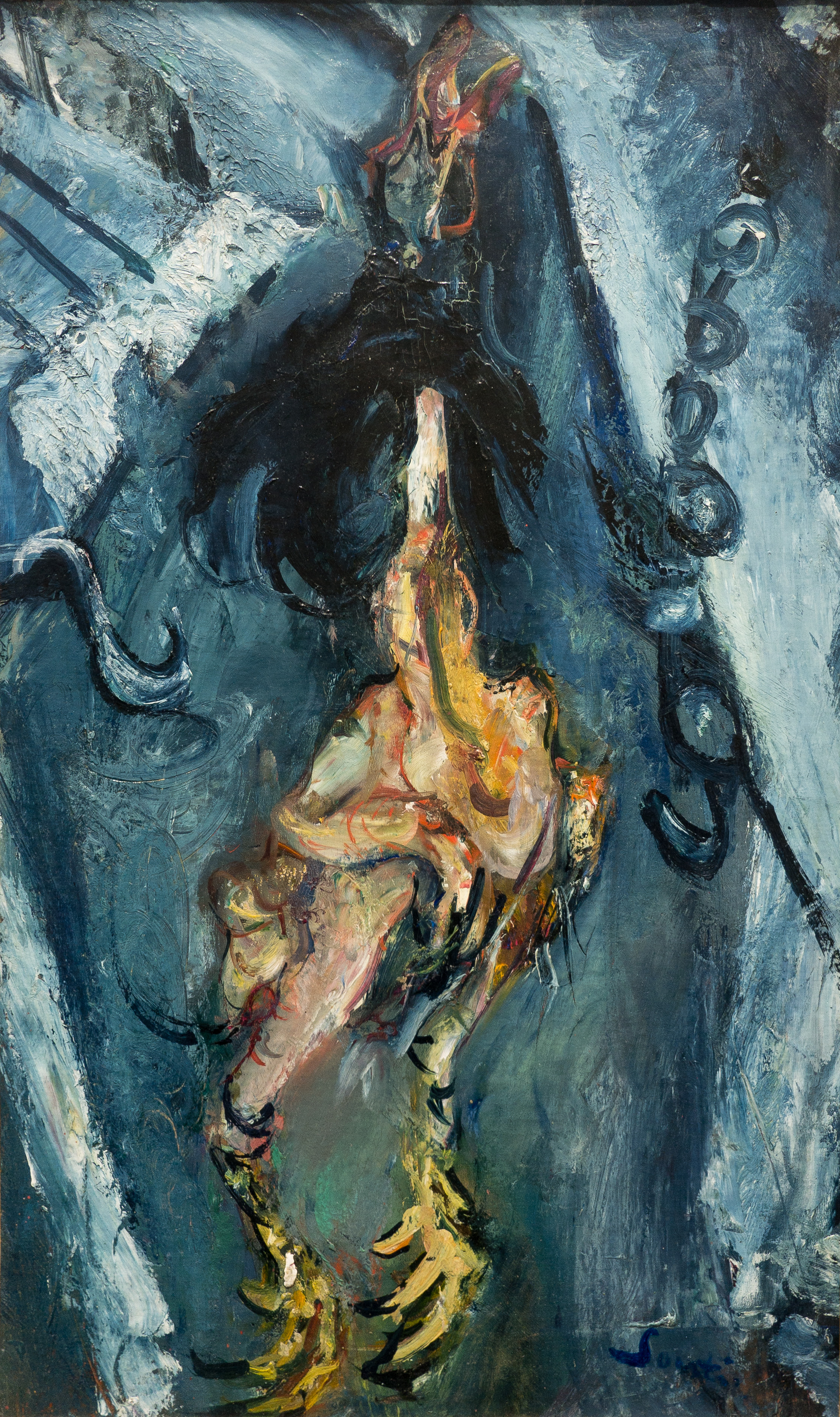
The Plucked Chicken (c. 1925), oil on canvas, dimensions unknown, Musée de l'Orangerie, Paris

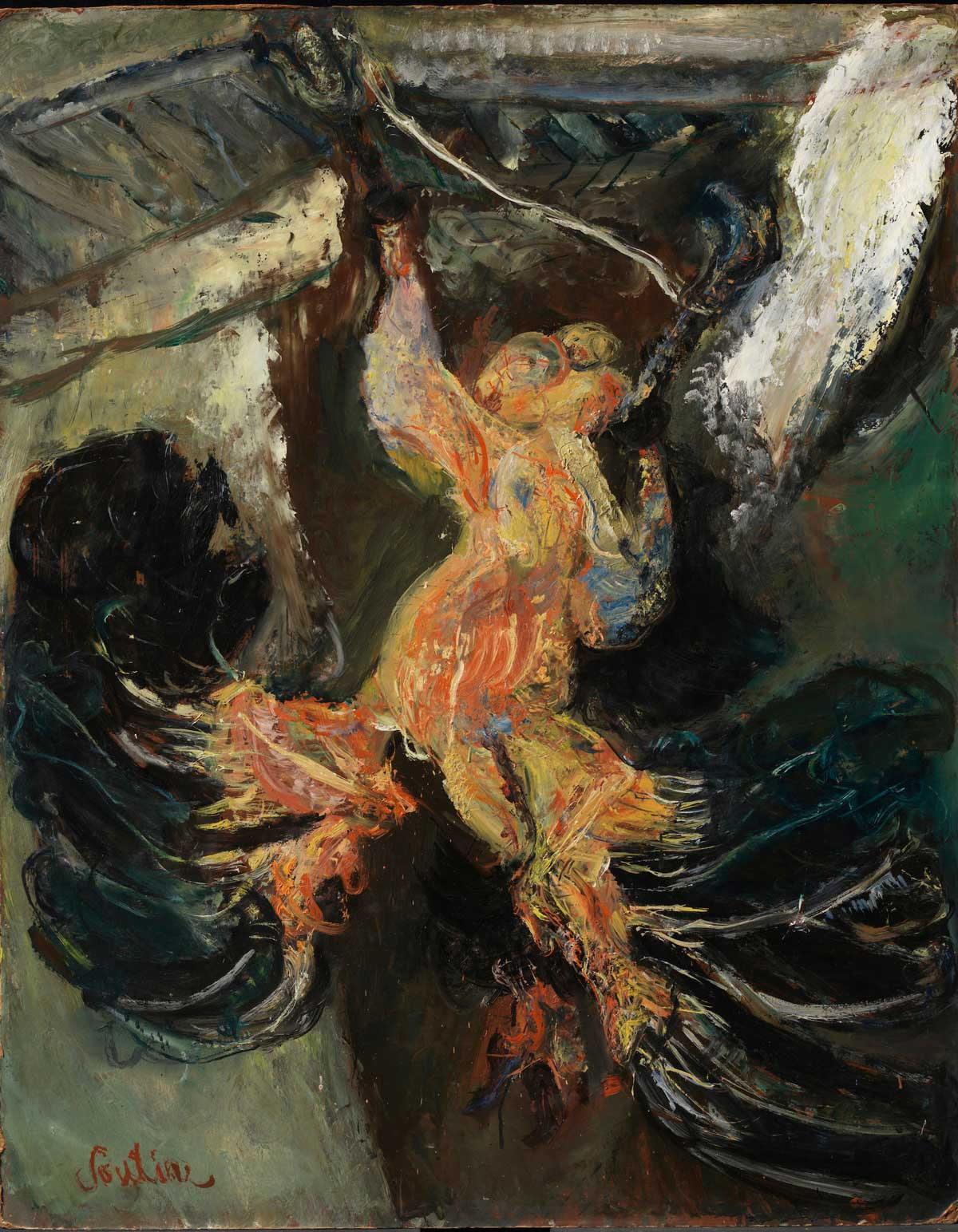
Hanging Turkey (c. 1925) oil on millboard, dimensions unknown,

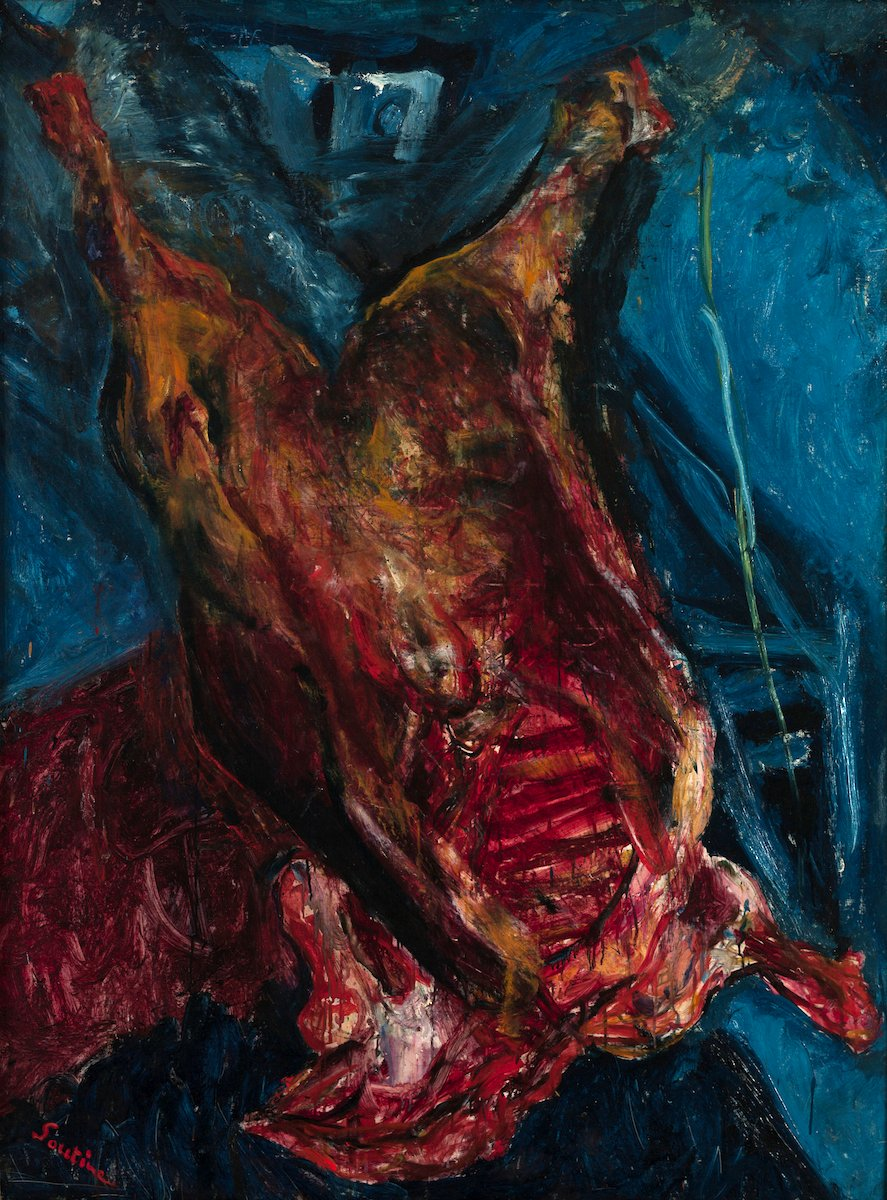
Carcass of Beef (c. 1925), oil on canvas, 53 × 32 in., Albright-Knox Art Gallery, Buffalo, New York

Landscapes

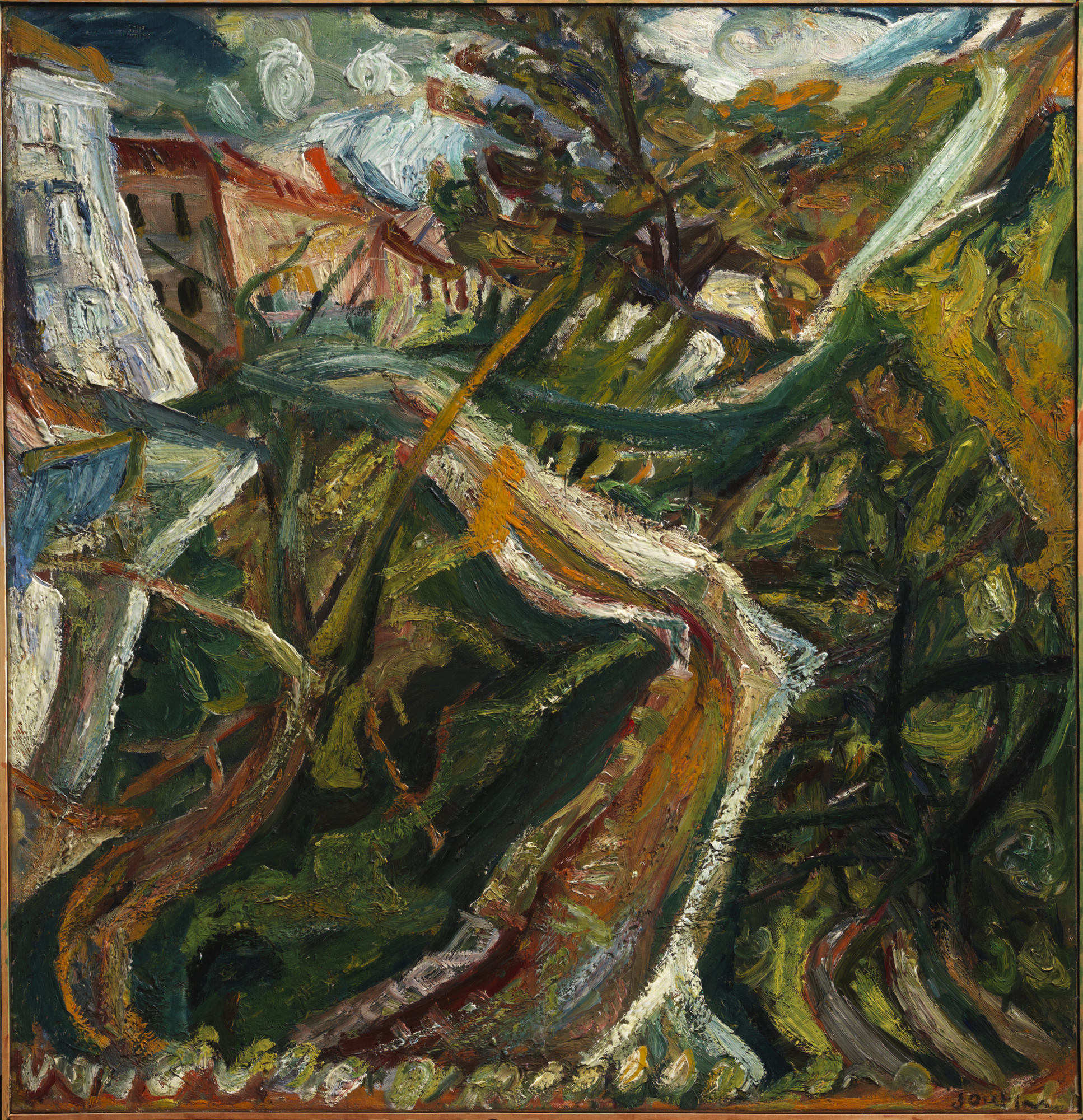
Chemin de la Fontaine des Tins at Céret, c. 1920, Henry and Rose Pearlman Collection on long-term loan to the Princeton University Art Museum

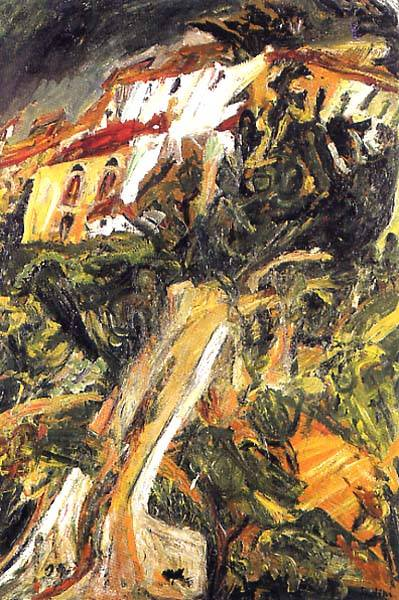
Chemin de la Fontaine Fils à Céret (1920) details unknown

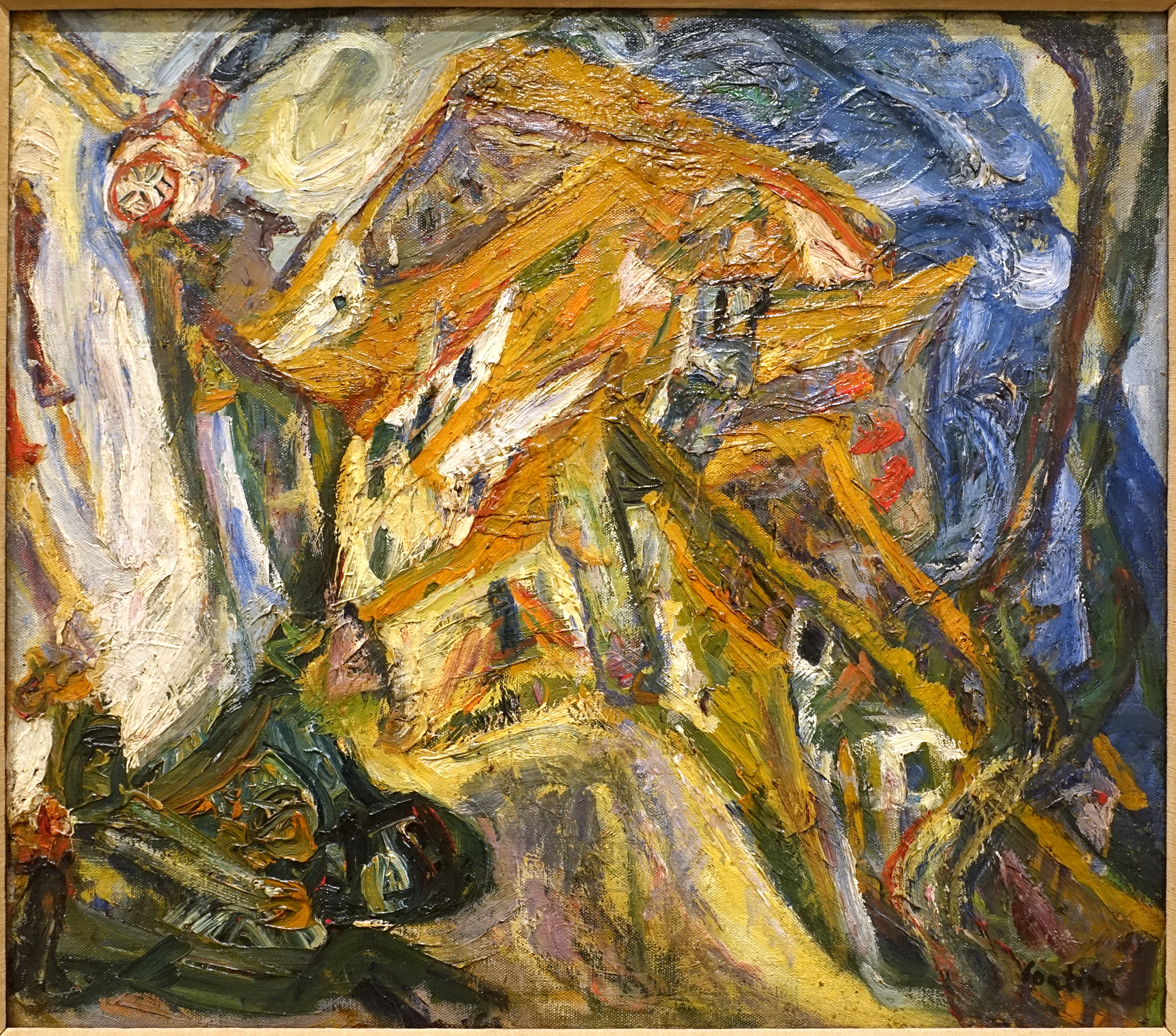
View of Céret (c. 1921–22) oil on canvas, Henry and Rose Pearlman Foundation on long-term loan to the Princeton University Art Museum

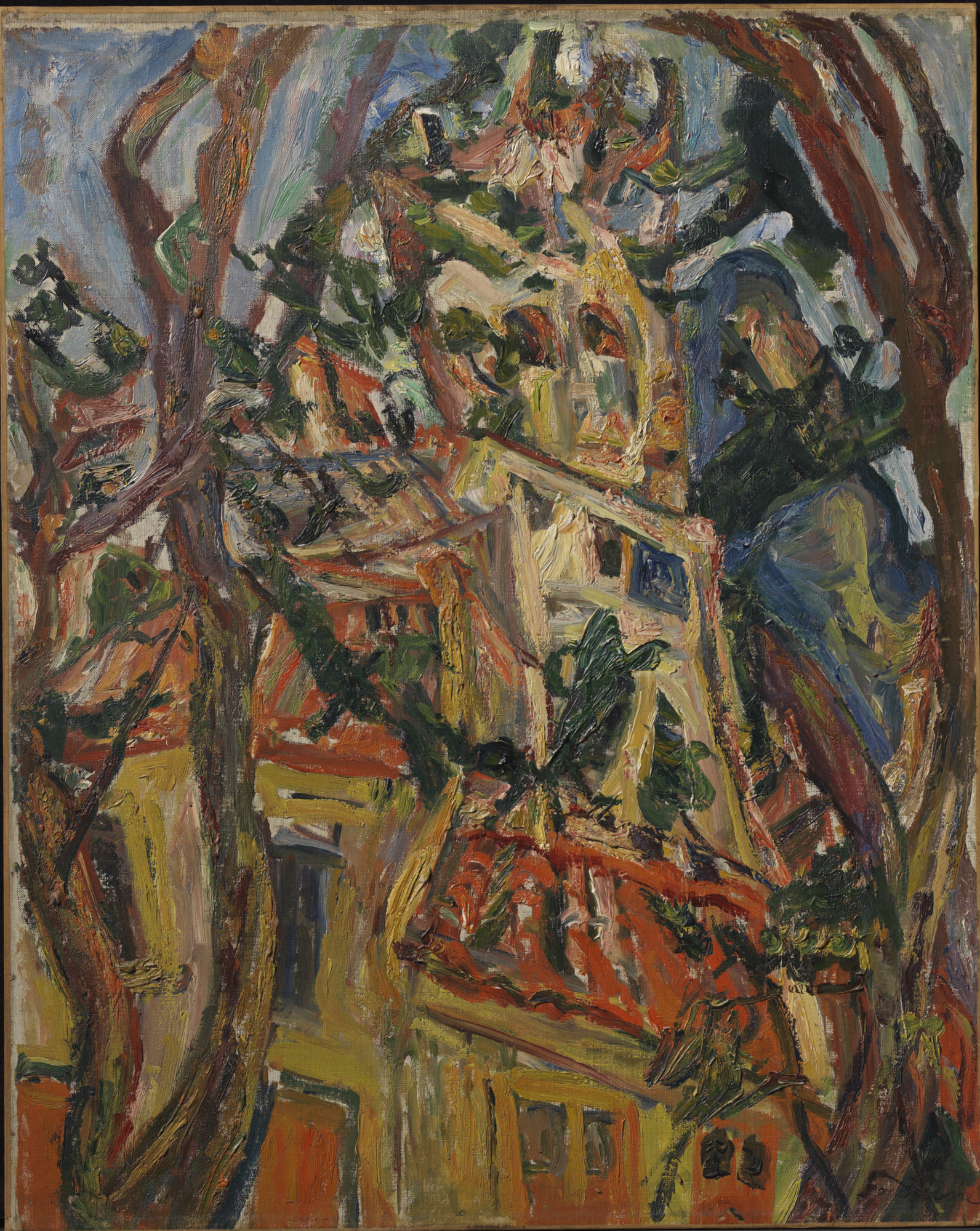
Steeple of Saint-Pierre at Céret, c. 1922, Henry and Rose Pearlman Foundation on long-term loan to the Princeton University Art Museum

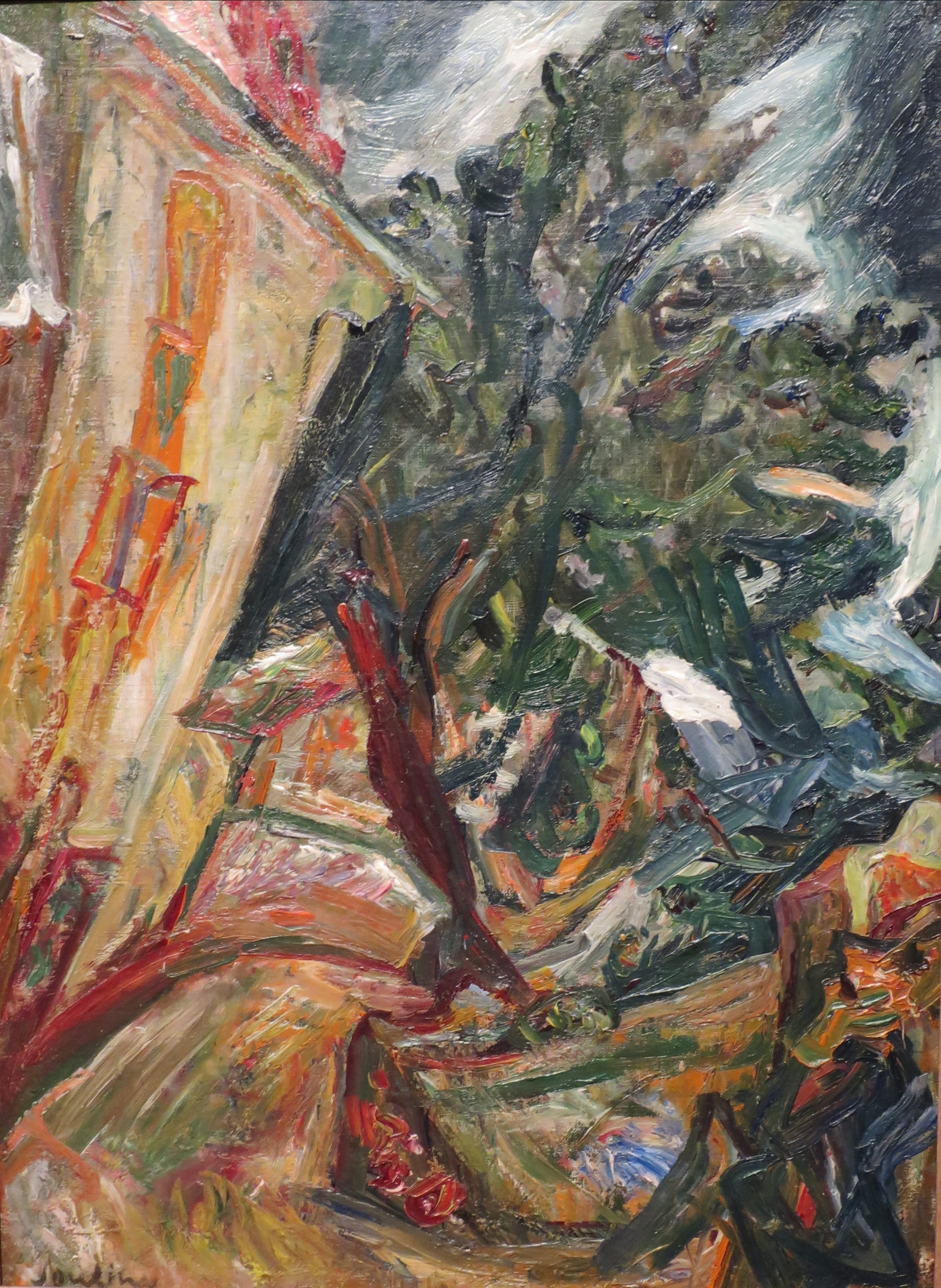
Landscape with Figures-Céret (1922) oil on canvas, dimensions unknown, High Museum of Art, Atlanta

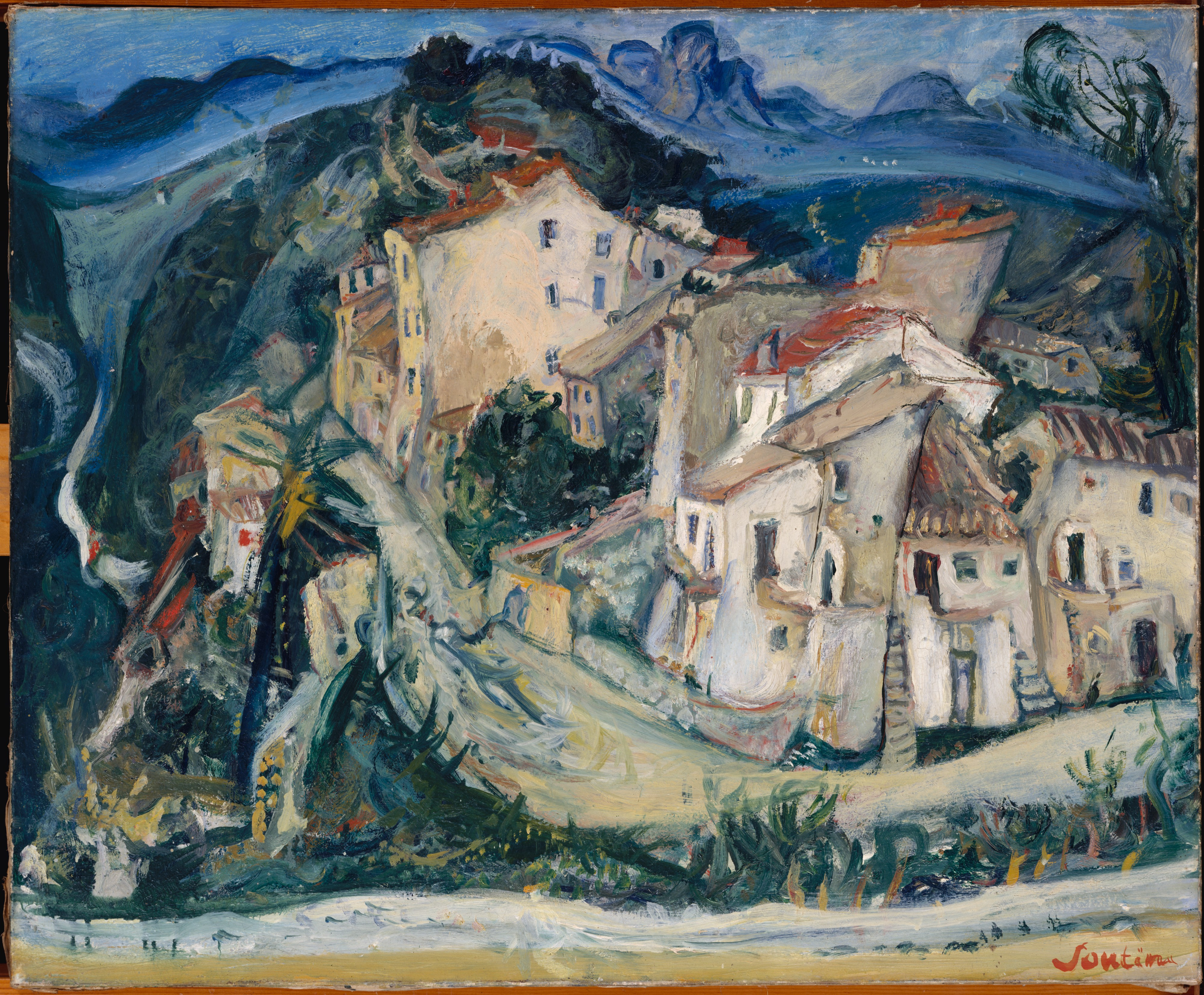
View of Cagnes (c. 1924 –25) oil on canvas, 23.7 × 28.8 in., Metropolitan Museum of Art, New York

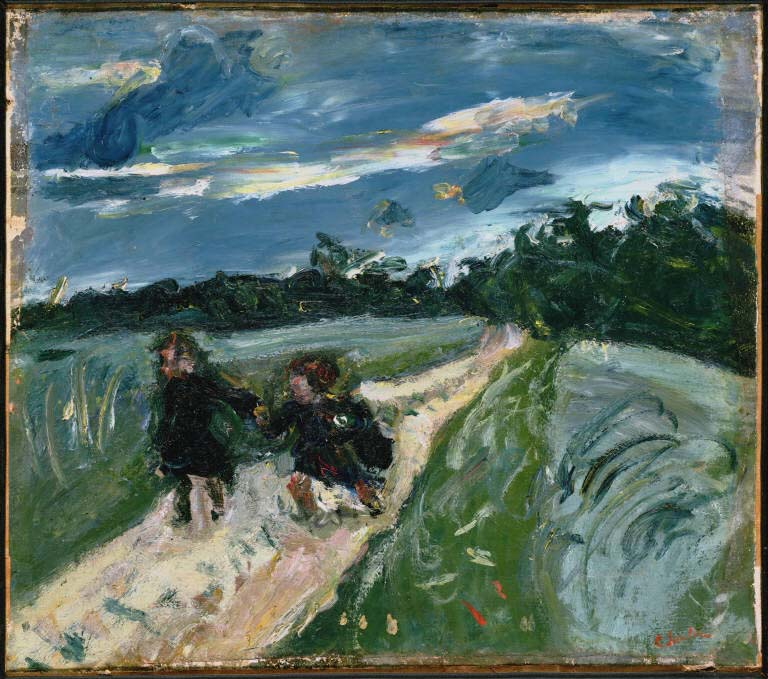
Return From School After the Storm (c. 1939) oil on canvas, 18 × 19.75 in., The Phillips Collection, Washington, D. C.

== See also ==
- School of Paris
- Amedeo Modigliani
- Marc Chagall
- Isaac Frenkel Frenel
- Jules Pascin
- Michel Kikoine
