= The Flayed Ox =

1925 oil on canvas painting by Chaïm Soutine

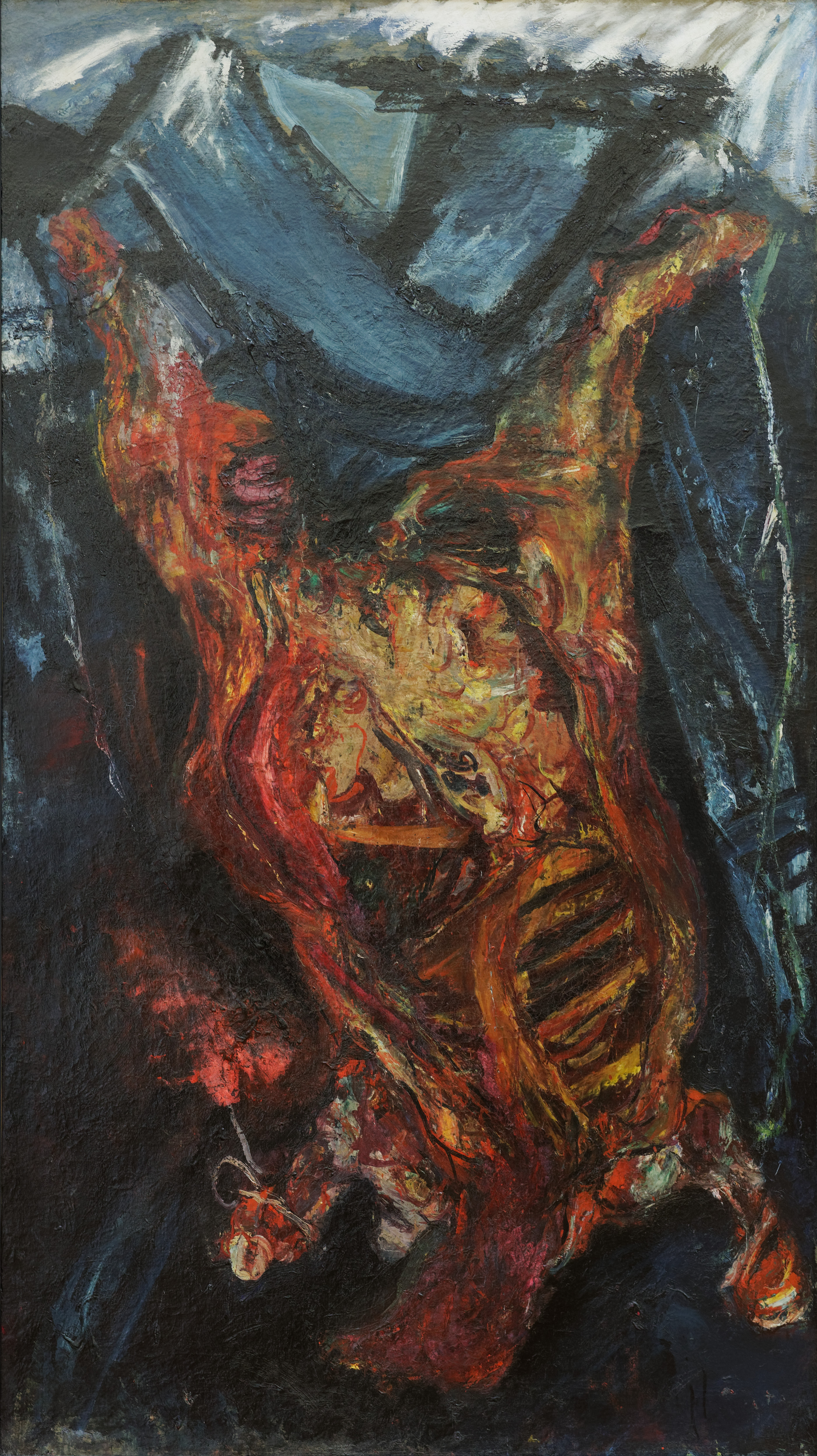
The Flayed Ox (1925) by Chaim Soutine

The Flayed Ox (Le Bœuf écorché) or The Slaughtered Ox is an oil on canvas painting by Chaïm Soutine, from 1925. It is inspired by the painting of the same name by Rembrandt. Measuring 2.02 m by 1.14 m, it is now in the Museum of Grenoble, which bought it in 1932 from the galerie Pierre-Loeb.

It is part of a series of paintings produced on the same subject at the time with the same title by Soutine, now split between different museums and private collections across the world, notably in Minneapolis and Amsterdam. Jean-Marc Rochette reproduced it several times in his autobiographical 2018 comic Ailefroide, altitude 3954.
