= Jacques Chapiro =

Latvian-born French Jewish painter (1887–1972)

Jacques (Ya'akov) Chapiro (1887–1972) was a painter of the School of Paris. Chapiro was born in Dinaburg, Russian Empire (now Daugavpils, Latvia) and died in Paris in 1972.

== Biography ==
The son of a wood sculptor, he began his artistic education at the early age of ten. In 1915, at the age of 18 he moved to Poland to attend the Kraków academy of fine art and in 1918 he moved to Ukraine to study at the Academy of Fine Arts of Kiev. Chapiro was Jewish.

During the Russian Civil War, while pursuing his studies, he contributed to the revolution efforts by painting posters. In 1921, he studied art in Petrograd, and during this period he worked as a decorator in the Meyerhold Theater. He worked for Stanislavski and Vakhtangov, both notorious in the field of theater.

In 1925, he left Russia in favor of Paris, and settled down in Montparnasse. As of 1926, he exhibited his works at the Salon des Indépendants, the Salon des Tuileries among other places. In 1939, he became a refugee, escaping to Carpentras and later on to Hautes-Alpes. When the war ended he traveled to Italy, before returning to Paris. When he did return to Paris he set down to write his book of anecdotal stories taken from the life of the artists from La Ruche. In the thirties, he painted several portraits, whose expressiveness and iconography preceded those of the portraits of Francis Bacon. Some art historians have repeatedly talked about a strong link between the painting of Van Gogh, Soutine, Chapiro and Bacon. He opposed the demolition of La Ruche in 1967 and founded, along with Marc Chagall and Raymond Cogniat, a committee that fought against this move. The committee succeeded in its cause. Chapiro's works can be found in museums in the United States (Chicago), Russia (Moscow) and France (Jeu de Paume, Paris). As to his artistic style, it seems that Chapiro was fond of experiments. His many paintings are much different from one another; some are classified as Cubistic in style, some as Impressionist and others as Fauvist. Throughout his artistic career, Chapiro kept sketching in his unique signature, with a light and talented hand. It is in his realistic sketching, which are somewhat casual, that one can be truly impressed by his talent.
