= JRP-Ringier =

Swiss book publisher

JRP | Editions
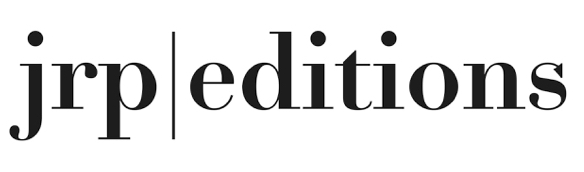
- Founded: 2004
- Founder: Lionel Bovier, Christophe Cherix, Michael Ringier
- Country of origin: Switzerland
- Headquarters location: Geneva
- Distribution: AVA Verlagsauslieferung (Switzerland); Cornerhouse Publications (UK); Distributed Art Publishers (US)
- Key people: Arnaud Hubert, Clément Dirié, Gilles Gavillet
- Publication types: Books, Prints
- Nonfiction topics: art
- Owner(s): Fondation suisse pour l’édition d’art (FSEA)
- Official website: jrp-editions.com

JRP Editions (formerly JRP|Ringier, 2004–2018), is a Swiss publisher of high-quality books on contemporary art.

Founded by Lionel Bovier in Zurich, Switzerland, the company has more than 400 titles in active distribution worldwide, including artists’ books, monographs, exhibition's catalogues, anthologies and books dedicated to writings by art critics and curators. It also publishes series from external associate editors, e.g., Christoph Keller Editions.

At the core of JRP Editions's program lie the books by contemporary artists themselves: the artists’ books. JRP Editions has already published influential artists such as Fischli & Weiss, John Armleder, Isa Genzken, Richard Prince, John Baldessari, Mike Kelley, Wolfgang Tillmans, Elaine Sturtevant or Rodney Graham. However the publisher continues to support younger or still overlooked Swiss and international artists, including Urs Fischer, Valentin Carron, Sterling Ruby, Troy Brauntuch, Tony Oursler, Kelley Walker, Mai-Thu Perret or Cyprien Gaillard.

JRP|Ringier's publications have won numerous design awards, including The Most Beautiful Swiss Book and Best Book Design from all over the World. While the Geneva-based studio Gavillet & Rust is responsible for the art direction, other renowned graphic designers such as Norm, M/M Paris, Cornel Windlin, Marie Lusa or Peter Saville have also contributed titles from JRP|Ringier's catalogue.

== Company history ==
JRP Editions (Just Ready to be Published) was founded in 1997 in Geneva, Switzerland, by art curators Lionel Bovier and Christophe Cherix, from their admiration for the small press scene of the 1970s. Between 1997 and 2003, around 30 artists’ books and prints emerged from this non-profit activity based on the founders’ network of friends in the art and academic world, design and printing industry.

In 2004, Lionel Bovier created JRP|Ringier, a new company in partnership with Michael Ringier, the owner of the Zurich-based Swiss media group Ringier AG. Christophe Cherix carried on his activities at the Cabinet des Estampes in Geneva and later at the Museum of Modern Art in New York, of which he became Chief Curator of prints and illustrated books. Since its creation, JRP|Ringier has produced books at an ever-increasing pace and currently releases about one book a week.

After 15 years of dynamic editorial activities as a commercial publishing company, JRP Ringier became JRP Editions on January 1, 2019. Placed under the responsibility of the Fondation suisse pour l’édition d’art (FSEA), a nonprofit entity presided over by Swiss artist John M. Armleder, this new imprint is committed to pursuing the distribution of titles published since 2004, as well as to publishing new books.

== Publishing philosophy ==
“Editing a book can be very similar to curating a show.” As an independent curator, Lionel Bovier, JRP|Ringier's founder, always considered the exhibition as a medium which can take very different forms, even that of a book. The artists’ books of the 1960s, with their autonomous and democratic qualities, seemed to him the ideal vehicles for art projects. But the production modes typically used by Fluxus artists in the 1970s, the book's materialization through collaborative processes, cheap reproduction techniques and circulation, were as much influential to his understanding of book making.

Another aspect of Lionel Bovier's publishing activities was born of a general dissatisfaction with group exhibition's catalogues (the pseudo-documentation of a project, produced before the show, with the two-pages-by-artist-rule, and the inadequate biographies). He replaced them in his own curatorial activity by another form: the anthology. It allowed him to devise and organize the return of textual material that was used to prepare the show, as well as to open the exhibition to its research. It was important for him to state the unfinished status of an exhibition and the anthology seemed to offer an interesting way out, presenting the show as a mere step in a longer journey.

== Awarded books since 2004 ==
The most beautiful Swiss books 2004

- Mark Leckey, 7 Windmill Street W1, JRP|Ringier, 2004. ISBN 978-2-940271-34-4

The most beautiful Swiss books 2005

- Cory Arcangel, Beige, JRP|Ringier, 2005. ISBN 978-3-905701-15-9
- Shahrzad, History, JRP|Ringier, 2005. ISBN 978-3-905701-50-0

The 2005 Jan-Tschichold Award was attributed to Gavillet & Rust, JRP|Ringier's art direction.

The most beautiful Swiss books 2006

- Peter Fischli/David Weiss, Fragen & Blumen, JRP|Ringier, 2006. ISBN 978-3-905770-08-7
- Late Shift, JRP|Ringier, 2006. ISBN 978-3-905701-78-4
- Tom Burr, Extrospective, JRP|Ringier, 2006. ISBN 978-3-905701-82-1
- ECAL Typography, We make fonts, JRP|Ringier, 2006. ISBN 978-2-940271-76-4
- HGKZ, Announcements, JRP|Ringier, 2006. ISBN 978-3-905701-84-5

The most beautiful Swiss books 2007

- Dieter Roth, Drawings, JRP|Ringier, 2007. ISBN 978-3-905770-66-7
- Hanspeter Hofmann, Bonheur automatique, JRP|Ringier, 2007. ISBN 978-3-905770-67-4
- Jim Shaw, Distorted Faces & Portraits 1978–2007, JRP|Ringier, 2007. ISBN 978-3-905701-13-5
- Johannes Wohnseifer, Werkverzeichnis 1992–2007, JRP|Ringier, 2007. ISBN 978-3-905770-62-9
- Lyon Biennal, 00s—The History of a Decade that Has not Yet Been Named, JRP|Ringier, 2007. ISBN 978-3-905829-02-0
- Marc Camille Chaimowicz, The World of Interiors, JRP|Ringier, 2007. ISBN 978-3-905701-67-8
- Rirkrit Tiravanija, A Retrospective, JRP|Ringier, 2007. ISBN 978-3-905770-32-2
- It's Time for Action, JRP|Ringier, 2007. ISBN 978-3-905770-53-7
- Wouldn't it be nice..., JRP|Ringier, 2007. ISBN 978-3-905829-24-2
- Carsten Nicolai, Static Fades, JRP|Ringier, 2007. ISBN 978-3-905770-63-6

Carsten Nicolai's Static Fades also received the Ehren Diplom 2007 (honorary degree) from the Leipzig book design competition (Best Book Design from all over the World).

The most beautiful Swiss books 2008

- Minotaure, Chants exploratoires, JRP|Ringier, 2008. ISBN 978-3-905829-94-5
- François-Gédéon Reverdin, Gravures néoclassiques, JRP|Ringier, 2008. ISBN 978-3-905829-35-8
- Henrik Olesen, Some Faggy Gestures, JRP|Ringier, 2008. ISBN 978-3-905829-46-4
- Shifting Identities, (Swiss) Art Now, JRP|Ringier, 2008. ISBN 978-3-905829-70-9
- Bob Nickas, Theft Is Vision, JRP|Ringier, 2008. ISBN 978-3-905770-36-0

The most beautiful Swiss books 2009

- Francis Baudevin, Miscellaneous Abstract, JRP|Ringier, 2009. ISBN 978-3-03764-067-8
- Valentin Carron, Learning from Martigny, JRP|Ringier, 2009. ISBN 978-3-03764-095-1
- Forde 1994–2009, JRP|Ringier, 2009. ISBN 978-3-03764-082-1
- Yann Sérandour, Inside the White Cube, JRP|Ringier, 2009. ISBN 978-3-03764-042-5
- Kiosk, Modes of Multiplication, JRP|Ringier, 2009. ISBN 978-3-03764-075-3
- Ari Marcopoulos, Within Arm's Reach, JRP|Ringier, 2009. ISBN 978-3-03764-074-6
- Boris Groys/Andro Wekua, Wait to Wait, JRP|Ringier, 2009. ISBN 978-3-03764-021-0
- Voids, A Retrospective, JRP|Ringier, 2009. ISBN 978-3-03764-017-3

Void, A Retrospective also received the Bronze Medal 2009 from the Leipzig book design competition (Best Book Design from all over the World).

The most beautiful Swiss books 2010

- Atlas of Transformation, JRP|Ringier, 2010. ISBN 978-3-03764-147-7
- Voici un dessin suisse 1990–2010, JRP|Ringier, 2010. ISBN 978-3-03764-100-2

The most beautiful Swiss books 2011

- John Kelsey, Wade Guyton. Black Paintings, JRP|Ringier, 2011. ISBN 978-3-03764-166-8
