= Glenn D. Lowry =

American art historian and museum director

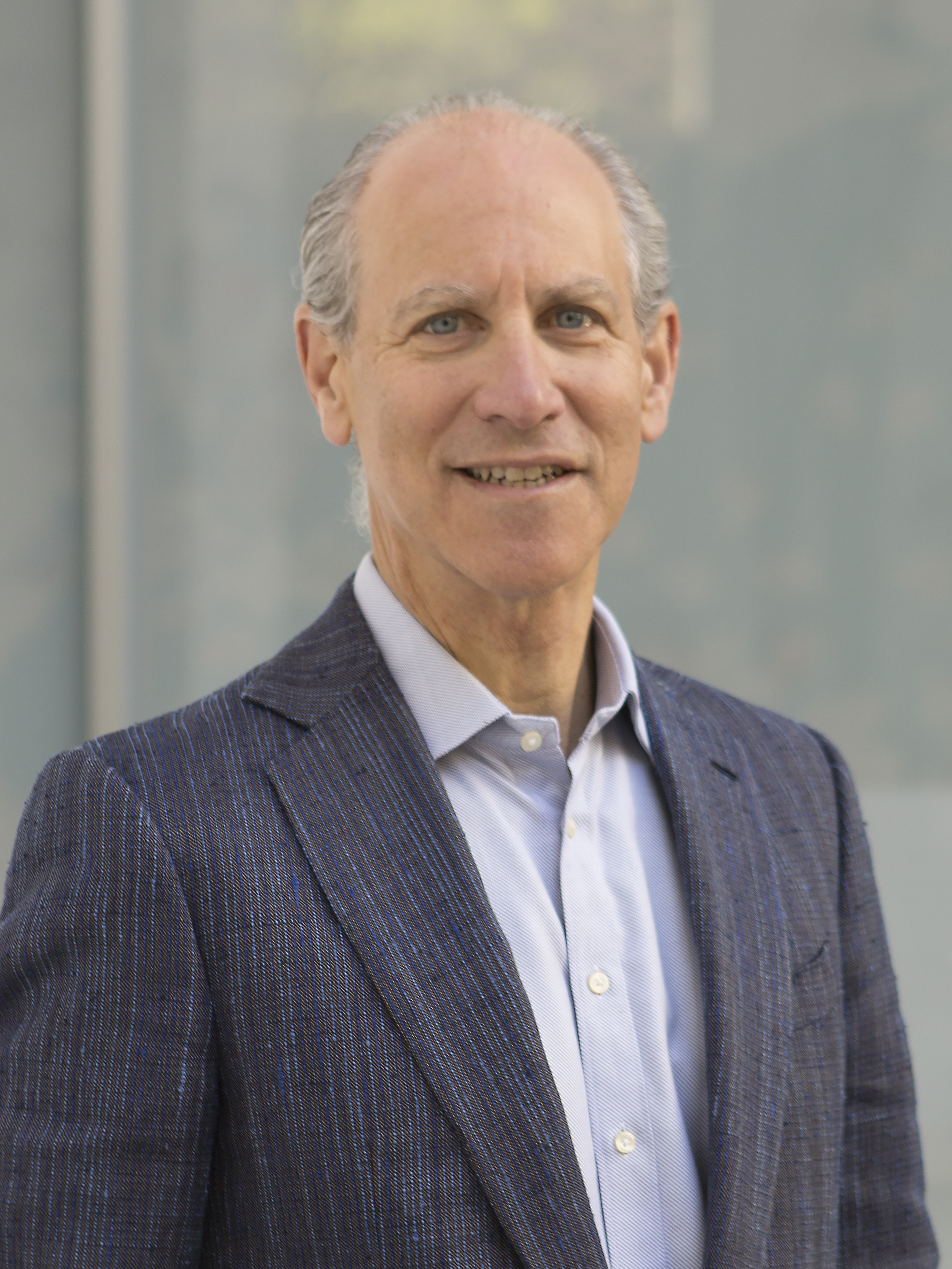
- Lowry in 2015
- Born: Glenn David Lowry; September 28, 1954 (age 71); New York City, New York, U.S.
- Education: Williams College (BA); Harvard University (MA, PhD)

Glenn David Lowry (born September 28, 1954) is an American art historian and director of the Museum of Modern Art (MoMA) in New York City from 1995 to 2025. His initiatives there include strengthening MoMA's contemporary art program, significantly developing the collection holdings in all media, and guiding two major campaigns for the renovation, expansion, and endowment of the museum. He has lectured and written extensively in support of contemporary art and artists and the role of museums in society, among other topics.

== Early life and education ==
Lowry was born in 1954 in New York City and raised in Williamstown, Massachusetts. He graduated from the Holderness School in 1972 and received a B.A. degree (1976), magna cum laude, from Williams College. He also obtained M.A. (1978) and Ph.D. (1982) degrees in the history of art from Harvard University, as well as honorary degrees from the Pennsylvania Academy of the Fine Arts (2000), the College of William and Mary (2009), and Florida Southern College (2017).

== Career ==
Lowry began his career as curator of Oriental art at the Rhode Island School of Design Museum in 1981. Lowry was appointed in 1983 as the first director of the Muscarelle Museum of Art at the College of William and Mary; he later became curator of Near Eastern Art at the Smithsonian Institution's Arthur M. Sackler Gallery and Freer Gallery of Art (1984–1990). He was director of the Art Gallery of Ontario from 1990 to 1995.

=== Director of the Museum of Modern Art ===
He was appointed director of the Museum of Modern Art in 1995.

In February 1999, Lowry and Alanna Heiss, former director of the P.S.1 Contemporary Art Center, initiated the merger of their two organizations.

Lowry guided MoMA's 2004 expansion and accompanying capital campaign—raising $450 million for the new building and over $450 million for the endowment and other related expenses. He and architect Yoshio Taniguchi unveiled the new museum on November 20, 2004.

In 2018, Lowry and the MoMA board agreed to an extension of his role as the David Rockefeller Director of the Museum of Modern Art through 2025, which will make him the longest-serving director since the museum opened in 1929.

Lowry led MoMA's 2019 renovation and expansion, developed with architects Diller Scofidio + Renfro in collaboration with Gensler, to add more than 40,000 square feet of new gallery space and offer a deep rethinking of MoMA's collection, and, by extension, of the history of art for the past century and a half. In September 2024, Lowry announced that he would retire in September 2025.

In November and December 2025, he is delivering a series of lectures at the Louvre.

== Other roles ==
Lowry is a board member of the Clark Art Institute, New Art Trust, the Creative Arts Council at Brown University, the Andrew W. Mellon Foundation, the Association of Art Museum Directors (AAMD), and the Robert Rauschenberg Foundation and is a former board member of Judd Foundation and Williams College. He is a fellow of the American Academy of Arts and Sciences, a member of the American Philosophical Society, and serves on the advisory council of the Department of Art History and Archaeology at Columbia University. In 2005, the French government honored Lowry with the title of Chevalier (Knight) dans l'Ordre national du Merité. In December 2025, the J. Paul Getty Trust announced that he would join the Trust's Board of Trustees.

== Personal life ==
Lowry is married to the former Susan Chambers, with whom he has three children. His daughter, Alexis Lowry, is a curator for the Dia Art Foundation. His son, Willy Lowry, is a correspondent at The National News.

He is fluent in French.

Between 1995 and 2003, the New York Fine Arts Support Trust paid Lowry $5.35 million in addition to compensation supplied by the museum, which in 2005 consisted of salary, bonus and benefits of $1.28 million; the trust had been created by MoMA as part of the effort to recruit Lowry to take over the museum in 1995. The trust fund was created by David Rockefeller and Agnes Gund, who made the payments "at the request of and for the benefit of the museum"; Lowry and his wife Susan, a Montréal-born landscape architect, live rent-free in a $6-million apartment located in MoMA's residential tower and purchased by the New York Fine Arts Support Trust in 2004.

== Publications ==
- With Quentin Bajac, Christophe Cherix, Stuart Comer, Rajendra Roy, Martino Stierli and Ann Temkin, MoMA Now: 375 Works from The Museum of Modern Art, New York. 2019.
- How contemporary art can change the world, CNN. September 8, 2017.
- With Jan Postma. The Museum of Modern Art in This Century. New York: The Museum of Modern Art. 2009.
- Oil and Sugar: Contemporary Art and Islamic Culture. The Royal Ontario Museum, 2009.
- Designing the New Museum of Modern Art. New York: The Museum of Modern Art. 2004.
- MoMA Highlights: 325 Works from The Museum of Modern Art. New York: The Museum of Modern Art. 2002.
- "Hello World". Time. November 1989, Pg. 36.
- With Thomas W. Lentz. Timur and the Princely Vision: Persian Art and Culture in the Fifteenth Century. Smithsonian Institution Press, 1989.
- Glenn D. Lowry, et al. Jeweler's Eye: Islamic Arts of the Book from the Vever Collection. University of Washington Press, 1988.
- Glenn D. Lowry, et al. Asian Art in the Arthur M. Sackler Gallery: The Inaugural Gift. Smithsonian Institution Press, 1987.
- Glenn D. Lowry, et al. From Concept to Context: Approaches to Asian and Islamic Calligraphy. Smithsonian Institution Press, 1986.
- With Michael Brand, eds., Fatehpur-Sikri: A Sourcebook. Cambridge, MA: The Aga Khan Program for Islamic Architecture at Harvard University and the Massachusetts Institute of Technology. 1985.

== Footnotes ==
Cultural offices
Preceded by Richard Oldenburg	Directors of the Museum of Modern Art; 1995-present	Succeeded by Incumbent
