= Richard Salomon =

Richard Salomon may refer to:

- Richard E. Salomon, vice-chairman of the Council on Foreign Relations
- Richard G. Salomon (1884–1966), historian of eastern European medieval history
- Richard G. Salomon (professor of Asian studies), University of Washington professor

== See also ==
- Rick Salomon, American poker player
