= A Convergence of Birds =

- Editor: Jonathan Safran Foer
- Language: English
- Subject: The Works of Joseph Cornell
- Published: 2001 D.A.P/Distributed Art Publishers, Inc.
- Publication place: United States
- ISBN: 1-891024-22-1

A Convergence of Birds is a collection of experimental fiction and poetry inspired by the artwork of Joseph Cornell.

== Table of Contents ==
"Emory Bird Hands' Birds" by Barry Lopez
"Rowing In Eden"by Erik Anderson Reece
"It Generally Leads a Solitary Life or Lives in Pairs" by Rick Moody
"The Box Artist" by Joyce Carol Oates
"Showing An Episode" by Diane Williams
"The Cursive Example" by Howard Norman
"Construction" by John Burghardt
"Boxed In" by Paul West
"Nine Boxes" by Siri Hustvedt
"The Grand Hotels" by Robert Coover
"For Brother Robert" by Bradford Morrow
"Magic Musée" by Martine Bellen
"The Appearance of Things" by Dale Peck
"Slide Show" by Joanna Scott
"Of A Feather" by Diana Ackerman
"Bookmark, Horizon (Emily Dickinson)" by Ann Lauterbach
"Because I Could Not Stop For Death" by Mary Caponegro
"Grid Box" by Rosmarie Waldrop
"Song" by Robert Pinsky
"The Impetus Was Delight" by Lydia Davis
"Poem In Which a Bird Does Some of the Talking" by John Yau
"If the Aging Magician Should Start to Believe" by Jonathan Safran Foer

== Summary and reception ==
Lynda Roscoe of The New York Times said: "Best known for his glass-covered box creations, many of them made in tribute to people he idealized, Cornell has elicited just as many tributes himself [...] Many of the books about (Cornell) — from Dore Ashton’s “Joseph Cornell Album” to Charles Simic’s improbably beautiful “Dime-Store Alchemy” to Jonathan Safran Foer’s anthology “A Convergence of Birds” — could themselves be described in Cornellian terms: collage-like, experimental, quixotic."
