= Keyla Orozco =

Cuban composer (born 1969)

- Born: 22 September 1969 (age 56); Santiago de Cuba, Cuba
- Education: Conservatorio Esteban Salas de Santiago de Cuba; National Art Schools; Instituto Superior de Arte; Royal Conservatory of The Hague; Sweelinck Conservatorium
- Occupation: Composer
- Awards: Guggenheim Fellowship (2000)
- Musical career
- Genres: Classical music; Cuban music

Keyla María Orozco Alemán (born 22 September 1969) is a Cuban composer based in the Netherlands and the United States. A 2000 Guggenheim Fellow, her music has drawn inspiration from Cuban music.

== Biography ==
Keyla María Orozco Alemán was born on 22 September 1969 in Santiago de Cuba. She studied at the Conservatorio Esteban Salas de Santiago de Cuba and National Art Schools, before studying composition at Instituto Superior de Arte with Harold Gramatges. She later studied at the Royal Conservatory of The Hague and the Sweelinck Conservatorium, the former under Theo Loevendie, who encouraged incorporation of Cuban elements towards her work.

In May 1999, Greg Sandow of the Wall Street Journal said that her piece Perpetuum, recently performed at the American Composers Orchestra's Sonidos de las Americas festival, "exemplified something striking about Cuban classical music, that it often uses Cuban dance rhythms". In July 1999, her piece Perpetuum was performed at the Uncommon Voices: A New Presence in Music event at Abby Aldrich Rockefeller Sculpture Garden. In 2007, her piece Para Ti Nengon, inspired by the Cuban genre nengón, appeared at a Merkin Hall concert on Cuban music. In May 2018, she appeared at the Kennedy Center. In November 2021, her piece Viajeros was the finale at Zofo's Zofomama show in Saint Paul, Minnesota; Sheila Regan said that Orozco "offered a richly theatrical piece of music" with a transition from Russian to Cuban music, noting that the backdrop represents Russian influence on the country.

In 2000, she was awarded a Guggenheim Fellowship. One of her compositions appeared on Yleana Bautista's album Impresiones. She was awarded a MacDowell Colony Fellowship in 2011. She was one of the five composers profiled in Iván César Morales Flores' 2018 book Identidades en proceso: Cinco compositores cubanos de la diáspora (1990–2013). In 2022, Marysol Quevedo of The Washington Post cited Orozco as an example of Cuban composers who settled abroad outside the United States after the end of the Cold War.

Originally based in the Netherlands, she now lives in Washington, D.C. She works in both the Netherlands and the United States.
