= Distributed Art Publishers =

American publishing company

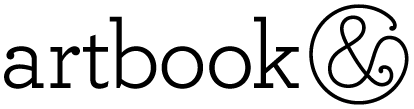
- Founded: 1990
- Founder: Sharon Helgason Gallagher
- Country of origin: United States
- Headquarters location: New York City
- Distribution: Ingram Publisher Services
- Publication types: Books and Limited Editions
- Nonfiction topics: Art
- Imprints: Metropolis Books
- Official website: www.artbook.com

D.A.P./Distributed Art Publishers, Inc. is an American company that distributes and publishes books on art, photography, design, and visual culture.

== Founding ==
D.A.P./Distributed Art Publishers was founded in New York in 1990 (and incorporated in 1992) by Sharon Helgason Gallagher (B.A., Yale University; M.A. Columbia University), who had previously worked as rights director and managing editor at Abbeville Press. It started out as a partnership between Gallagher and Daniel Power, with an office supplied by Parkett, but Power left fairly soon afterwards and Gallagher moved the company to new quarters. Gallagher remains the president and publisher of the firm she created with the goal of bringing international art books to North American readers. In 2011, Gallagher was one of 30 women leaders and artists honored at a gala at the Museum of Modern Art, New York, by ArtTable, an American association of professional women in the arts.

== Areas of activity ==
D.A.P. is primarily an exclusive distributor of art books and special editions from publishers, museums, and cultural institutions including the Museum of Modern Art (New York), the Museum of Contemporary Art, Los Angeles, the Walker Art Center, the Guggenheim Museum, Aperture, Hatje Cantz, JRP-Ringier, and Walther Koenig Publishers. Since its founding, D.A.P. has offered over 12,000 titles in the areas of visual arts, architecture, design, art theory and criticism, and visual culture. Gallagher has also inaugurated a publishing program under which D.A.P. publishes or co-publishes art books and illustrated works of fiction. One of the firm's publishing imprints is Metropolis Books, which focuses on urban design and architecture.

In the mid-1990s, D.A.P. launched a website to sell books directly to consumers. In 2008, the web operation was named ARTBOOK (artbook.com). ARTBOOK/D.A.P. also sells directly to the public through a bookstore located in MoMA P.S.1 and a showroom in Los Angeles, and at book fairs such as Frieze New York, Art Basel Miami, Los Angeles Art Book Fair, and Hong Kong International Art Fair. The firm usually issues a catalog twice a year and keeps an active backlist available through the website.

Recent publications and co-publications include Doug Aitken’s Idea of the West, a reprint of Otto Neurath's The Language of the Global Polis, and Robert Rauschenberg's Photographs.
