= Morris Hirshfield =

American painter (1872-1946)

- Born: 1872; Poland
- Died: 1946 (aged 73–74); New York City, New York, USA
- Known for: Painting
- Movement: Contemporary Art

Morris Hirshfield (1872–1946) was a Polish-American painter.

== Life ==
Hirshfield was born in Poland, but emigrated to the United States at the age of eighteen. He found employment at a women's coat factory; later, he founded a business with his brother, first manufacturing women's coats, then women's slippers. He retired in 1935 due to failing health.

Hirshfield began to paint in 1937. He was soon championed by gallerist Sidney Janis, who had a great interest in self-taught artists. Janis included some of Hirshfield's works in a 1939 exhibition, Contemporary Unknown American Painters, and a 1942 book, They Taught Themselves: American Primitive Painters of the 20th Century. His painting found favor in surrealist circles; he was lauded by André Breton, and was a participant in the first American surrealist exhibition, First Papers of Surrealism, in 1942.

He received a one-man show at the Museum of Modern Art in 1943. The show occasioned some negative criticism; Art Digest referred to Hirshfield as "The Master of Two Left Feet", and the bad press the show received figured into the demotion of MoMA's director, Alfred H. Barr Jr.

Hirshfield died in New York City in 1946.

His works were appreciated by Marcel Duchamp and Piet Mondrian. Peggy Guggenheim was one of his most important collectors. Following his death, she organized a commemorative exhibition in her gallery Art of This Century.

== Work ==
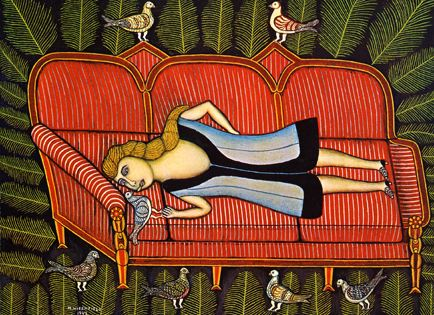
Morris Hirshfield, ''Girl with Pigeons'', 1942

Only 77 works were created by Hirshfield during his career. His heavily patterned work, featuring women or animals, is often reminiscent of textiles, perhaps as a legacy of his first career.

His work is part of major collections, including the Museum of Modern Art, New York, the Musée National d'Art Moderne, Paris, the Peggy Guggenheim Collection in Venice and the Zander Collection in Cologne.

== Exhibitions ==
- Morris Hirshfield Rediscovered, American Folk Art Museum, New York (23.9.2022–29.1.2023)
- 27 Artists. 209 Works, Zander Collection, Bönnigheim (20.3.2016–29.1.2017)
- Der Schatten der Avantgarde. Rousseau und die vergessenen Meister, Museum Folkwang, Essen (2.10.2015–10.1.2016)
- Alberto Giacometti e Max Ernst: Surrealismo e oltre nella Collezione, Peggy Guggenheim Collection, Venice (8.12.2002–23.2.2003)
- Self-Taught Artists of the 20th Century: An American Anthology, Philadelphia Museum of Art, Philadelphia (10.3.–17.5.1998)
- Internationale Naive Kunst, Charlotte Galerie für Naive Kunst, Munich (18.10.1974–31.1.1975)
- 44 paintings by Morris Hirshfield, Sidney Janis Gallery, New York (2.3.- 3.3.1965)
- Morris Hirshfield, Galerie Maeght, Paris (1.1951)
- Last Paintings of Morris Hirshfield, Art of This Century, New York (11.2.–1.3.1947)
- The Paintings of Morris Hirshfield, The Museum of Modern Art, New York (23.6.–1.8.1943)
- First Papers of Surrealism, Coordinating Council of French Relief Society, New York (14.10.–7.11.1942)
- Modern Primitives. Artists of the People, The Museum of Modern Art, New York (21.10.1941–30.4.1944)
- Sidney Janis Collection, Albright Art Gallery, Buffalo (1940)
- Contemporary Unknown American Paintings, The Museum of Modern Art, New York (18.10.–18.11.1939)
