= Broadway Boogie Woogie =

Painting by Piet Mondrian

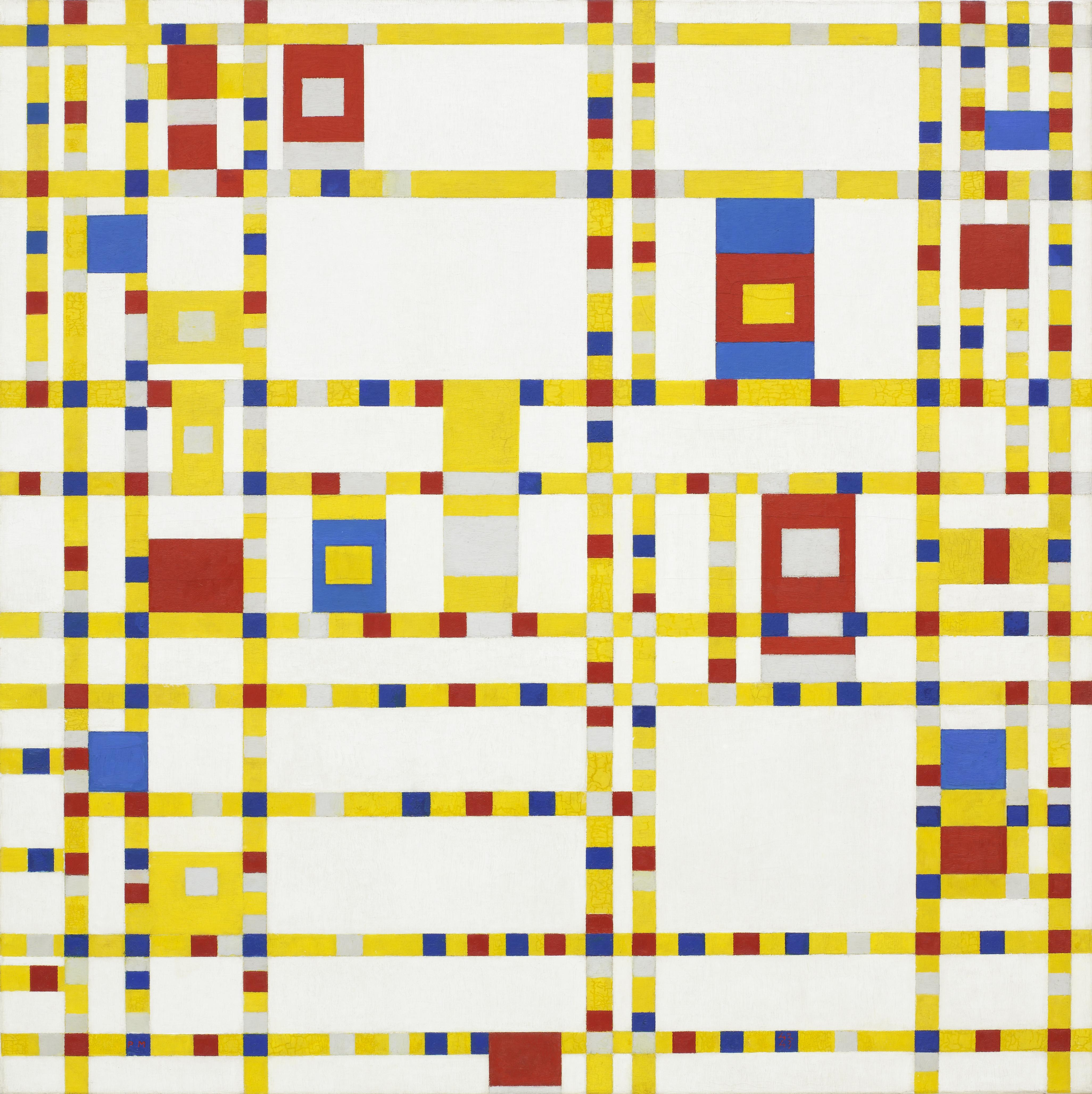
- Artist: Piet Mondrian
- Year: 1942–43
- Catalogue: 78682
- Medium: Oil on canvas
- Dimensions: 127 cm × 127 cm (50 in × 50 in)
- Location: Museum of Modern Art; New York
- Accession: 73.1943

Broadway Boogie Woogie is an oil on canvas painting by Piet Mondrian, completed in 1943, after he had moved to New York in 1940.

== Description ==
Compared to his earlier work, the canvas is divided into many more squares. Although he spent most of his career creating abstract work, this painting is inspired by clear real-world examples: the city grid of Manhattan, and boogie-woogie, an African-American blues style of music Mondrian loved. The painting was bought by the Brazilian sculptor Maria Martins for $800 at the Valentine Gallery in New York City, after Martins and Mondrian both exhibited there in 1943. Martins later donated the painting to the Museum of Modern Art in New York City.

== Analysis ==
When Piet Mondrian arrived in New York, he became fond of the neat, rigid architecture. He integrated the mood and tone of jazz into this work. Mondrian called it the “destruction of natural appearance; and construction through continuous opposition of pure means - dynamic rhythm.”
