= Margareta Akermark =

Film curator and library

Margareta Akermark (1913–1983) was a Swedish-born film curator and librarian at the Museum of Modern Art in New York. For over 37 years with the Museum, she assembled a library of 1,000 films, which were the basis of the Museum's circulating collection, one most important international collections outside of government-owned archives, and was instrumental in the development of university film programs throughout the United States.

== Early life and education ==
Akermark was born in 1913 in Gothenburg, Sweden. Akermark studied art at the Teckniska Skolan in Stockholm and at the Slttjdfbreningen in Gothenburg, with further studies in art and languages in France, Belgium, and England. She moved to the United States in the early 1940s.

== Career ==
Akermark joined the museum in 1941. In 1965, she was promoted to Associate Director of the Museum of Modern Art Film Library, under Willard Van Dyke, from formerly being in charge of the Library's circulating film program and Executive Secretary of the department. The circulating film program that was established by Akermark served more than 2,300 schools, film groups, and other organizations with in the mid-1960s, according to Akermark quoted in The New York Times.

She originated the weekly "Films at Noon" series and directed film programs coordinated with major museum exhibits such "The Family of Man".

She contributed articles on films to a number of American as well as Swedish publications. She served on the founding executive committee of the American Federation of Film Societies in 1954.

In 1978, she was awarded the Mayor's Award of Honor for contributions to arts and culture.

Akermark died in 1983.
