= Abby Aldrich Rockefeller Sculpture Garden =

Garden in Manhattan, New York

Coordinates: 40.761445°N 73.976784°W

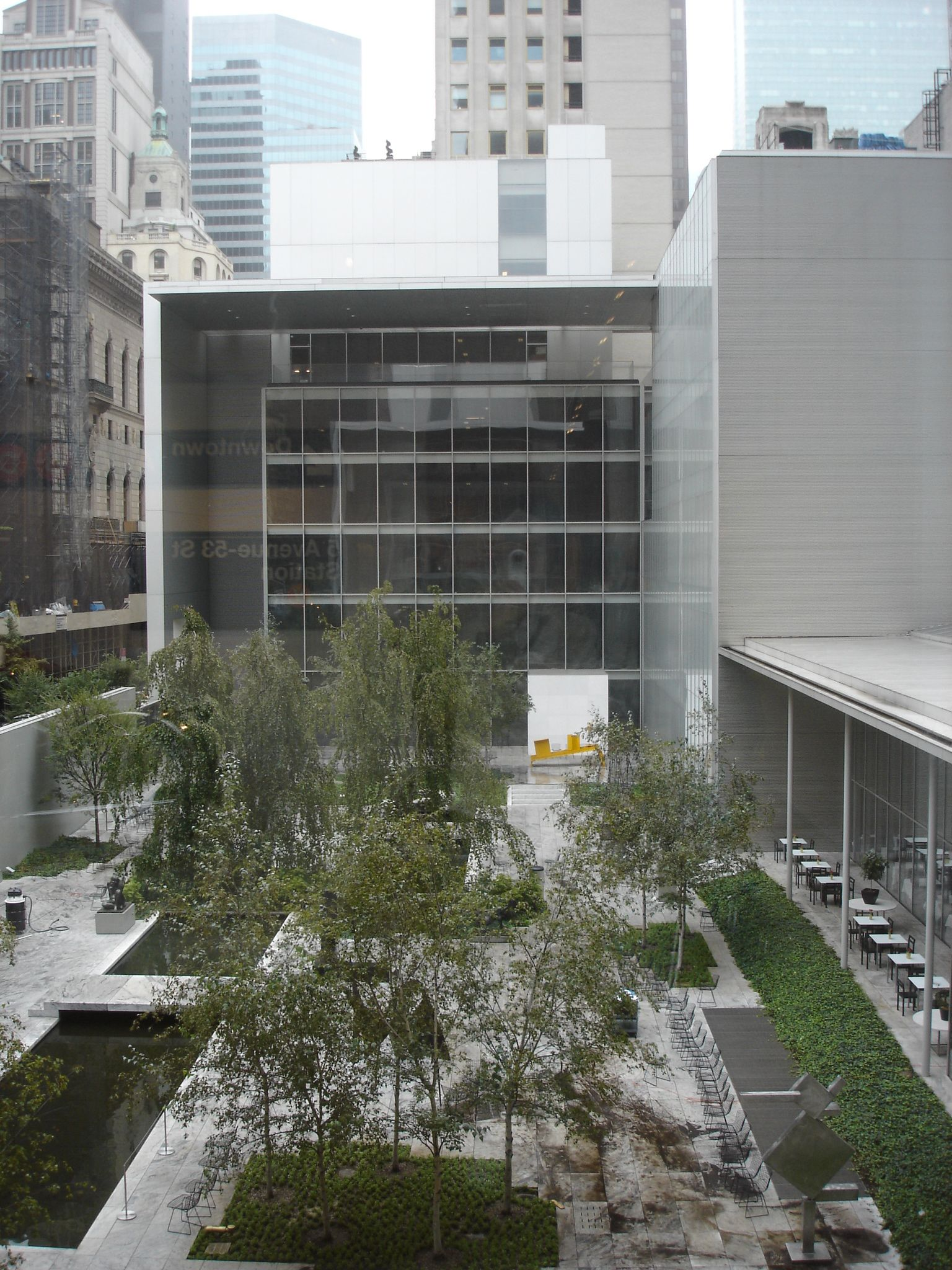
Abby Aldrich Rockefeller Sculpture Garden

The Abby Aldrich Rockefeller Sculpture Garden is an outdoor courtyard at the Museum of Modern Art in Manhattan, New York City. Designed by notable architect Philip Johnson, the courtyard was conceived at the same time as Johnson's West Wing annex for the museum. Construction began in spring 1952 and was completed in April 1953.

Throughout its history, the garden has served as the temporary setting for notable artworks including Alexander Calder's Black Widow (1959), Anthony Caro's Midday (1960), Pablo Picasso's She-Goat (1950), as well as providing a space for innovative exhibitions like 8 AUTOMOBILES (1951) and Italy: The New Domestic Landscape (1972).
