= Ann Temkin =

American art curator (born 1959)

- Born: Ann T. Temkin; December 26, 1959; Torrington, Connecticut U.S.
- Education: Harvard University; Yale University
- Occupation: Museum curator

Ann Temkin (born December 26, 1959) is the Marie-Josée and Henry Kravis Chief Curator of Painting and Sculpture at The Museum of Modern Art (MoMA) in New York.

== Early life and education ==
Born in Torrington, Connecticut, Temkin is the daughter of Abraham Temkin and Joann Temkin (née Bernstein). She earned her bachelor's degree magna cum laude from Harvard University in 1981 and a Ph.D. in art history from Yale University in 1991.

== Career ==
Temkin began her career as a Curatorial Assistant in MoMA's Department of Painting and Sculpture. She then joined the Philadelphia Museum of Art, first as Assistant Curator and then the Muriel and Philip Berman Curator of Twentieth Century Art. Her exhibitions included, among others, "Thinking Is Form: The Drawings of Joseph Beuys" (1994), "Constantin Brancusi" (1995), "Alice Neel" (2001), and "Barnett Newman" (2002). Temkin commissioned new works by artists such as Sherrie Levine, Richard Hamilton, and Gabriel Orozco for the "Museum Studies" series.

In 2003, she returned to MoMA and was named the Blanchette Hooker Rockefeller Curator in the Department of Painting and Sculpture. In 2008, Temkin became the Marie-Josée and Henry Kravis Chief Curator of Painting and Sculpture. Upon assuming the leadership of the department, Ms. Temkin initiated the reimagining of the Museum’s collection galleries, transforming them from medium-specific spaces into integrated presentations that are fluid rather than fixed, and offer multiple points of view rather than one canonical narrative. Temkin has also focused on reshaping the acquisitions program of the Painting and Sculpture Department, dramatically expanding the breadth of the collection.

In September 2026, MoMA announced that Tempkin would step down from her position as the Marie-Josée and Henry Kravis Chief Curator of Painting and Sculpture in January 2027. Tempkin will assume a new role as a Strategic Advisor focusing on MoMA’s 2029 centennial initiatives.

== Exhibitions ==
Exhibitions that she has curated include: Color Chart: Reinventing Color, 1950 to Today (2008), Gabriel Orozco (2009), Abstract Expressionist New York (2010), Claes Oldenburg: The Street and The Store and Mouse Museum/Ray Gun Wing (2013), Ellsworth Kelly: Chatham Series (2013), Ileana Sonnabend: Ambassador for the New (2013), Jasper Johns: Regrets (2014), Robert Gober: The Heart Is Not a Metaphor (2014), Picasso Sculpture (2015), Studio Visit: Selected Gifts from Agnes Gund (2018), Judd (2020), and Matisse: The Red Studio (2022). She is currently preparing a multi-authored anthology of essays about the first generation of women at MoMA.

== Personal life ==
Temkin is married to Wayne Hendrickson, a biophysicist at Columbia University. She has a daughter, Rachel, and two stepdaughters, Helen and Inga.

== Works and publications ==
Temkin is the author or co-author of several books, including:

- Temkin, Ann. Thinking is Form: The Drawings of Joseph Beuys. Philadelphia: Philadelphia Museum of Art, 1993.
- Garrels, Gary, Ann Temkin, Richard Flood, and Robert Gober. Robert Gober: Sculpture and Drawing. Minneapolis: Walker Art Center, 1999.
- Temkin, Ann, ed. Alice Neel. Philadelphia: Philadelphia Museum of Art, 2000.
- Temkin, Ann. Twentieth Century Painting and Sculpture in the Philadelphia Museum of Art. 2nd ed. Philadelphia: Philadelphia Museum of Art, 2001.
- Temkin, Ann, ed. Barnett Newman. Philadelphia: Philadelphia Museum of Art, 2002.
- Brennan, Marcia, Alfred Pacquement, and Ann Temkin. A Modern Patronage: De Menil Gifts to American and European Museums. New Haven: The Menil Collection - Yale University Press, 2007.
- Temkin, Ann, Anne Byrd, Benjamin H. D. Buchloh, Briony Fer, and Paulina Pobocha. Gabriel Orozco. New York: The Museum of Modern Art, New York, 2009.
- Temkin, Ann. Claude Monet: Water Lilies (MoMA Artist Series). New York: The Museum of Modern Art, New York, 2009.
- Temkin, Ann. MoMA Masterpieces: Painting and Sculpture. New York: Thames & Hudson Ltd, 2009.
- Temkin, Ann. The Scream: Edvard Munch. New York: The Museum of Modern Art, New York, 2012.
- Temkin, Ann and Christophe Cherix. Jasper Johns: Regrets. New York: The Museum of Modern Art, New York, 2014.
- Temkin, Ann and Anne Umland, eds. Picasso Sculpture. New York: The Museum of Modern Art, New York, 2015.
- Tempkin, Ann, ed. Painting and Sculpture at The Museum of Modern Art. New York: The Museum of Modern Art, New York, 2015.

== Awards ==
- 2010: Moore College of Art and Design, Visionary Woman Awards
- 2012: New York University Institute of Fine Arts, Honorary Fellowship
