= Richard E. Salomon =

American investment banker and philanthropist

- Education: Columbia Business School (MBA, 1967)
- Occupation: Investment banker
- Years active: 1967–2017
- Organization: Council on Foreign Relations (2003–2017)

Richard E. "Rick" Salomon is an American investment banker and philanthropist. He served as a member of the board of directors of the Council on Foreign Relations from 2003 to 2013 and again from 2014 to 2017.

== Education ==
Salomon graduated with a BA from Yale University in 1964 and an MBA from Columbia University Graduate School of Business in 1967.

== Career ==
From 1982 to 2000, Salomonwas a managing director to the investment firm Spears, Benzak, Salomon & Farrell. He was then the director of Mecox Ventures, another investment firm. In 1984, he was elected to the Common Cause National Governing Board.

He is a managing partner of East End Advisors, LLC, chairman of the advisory board of Blackstone Alternative Asset Management Group, and a director of Boston Properties. He has advised the Rockefeller family.

He is a trustee of the Museum of Modern Art, the Alfred P. Sloan Foundation, and The New York Public Library. He is the vice-chairman of the board of trustees of Rockefeller University and a board member of the Peterson Institute for International Economics.

== Personal life ==
He has written a memoir, privately published in 2020.
