= Museum of Modern Art =

Art museum in New York City, US

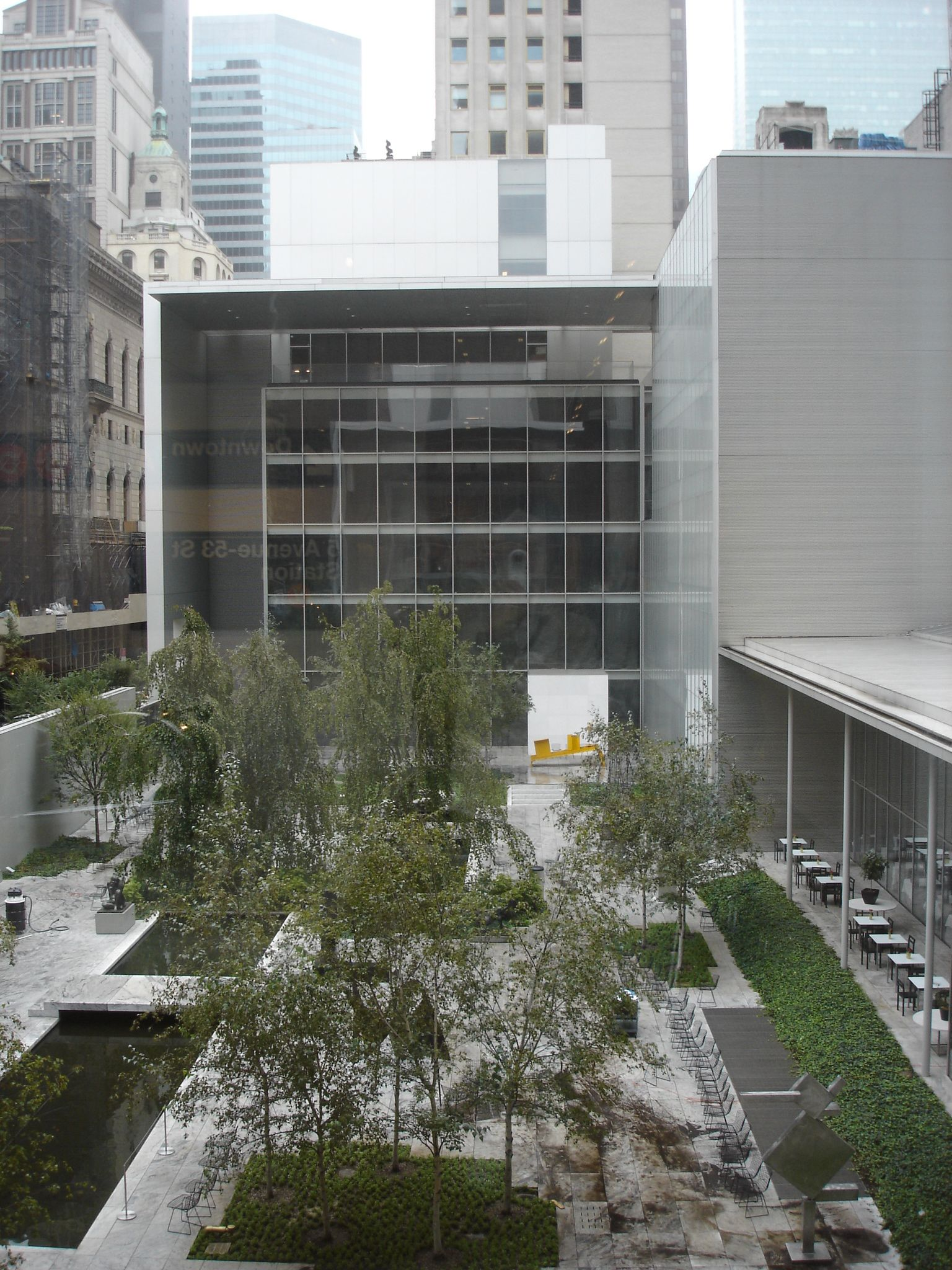
- The Museum of Modern Art in New York City
- Interactive fullscreen map
- Established: November 7, 1929; 97 years ago
- Location: 11 West 53rd Street; Manhattan, New York City, U.S.
- Coordinates: 40°45′42″N 73°58′39″W
- Type: Art museum
- Visitors: 2,839,509 (2023)
- Director: Christophe Cherix
- Public transit access: Subway: Fifth Avenue/53rd Street ( trains); Bus: M1, M2, M3, M4, M5, M7, M31, M50, M57, Q32
- Website: www.moma.org

The Museum of Modern Art (MoMA) is an art museum located in Midtown Manhattan, New York City, on 53rd Street between Fifth and Sixth Avenues. MoMA's collection spans the late 19th century to the present, and includes over 200,000 works of architecture and design, drawing, painting, sculpture, photography, prints, illustrated and artist's books, film, as well as electronic media. The museum has been instrumental in shaping the history of modern art, particularly modern art from Europe.

The institution was conceived in 1929 by Abby Aldrich Rockefeller, Lillie P. Bliss, and Mary Quinn Sullivan. Initially located in the Heckscher Building on Fifth Avenue, it opened just days after the Wall Street Crash. The museum was led by A. Conger Goodyear as president and Abby Rockefeller as treasurer, with Alfred H. Barr Jr. as its first director. Under Barr's leadership, the museum's collection rapidly expanded, beginning with an inaugural exhibition of works by European modernists. Despite financial challenges, including initial opposition from John D. Rockefeller Jr., the museum moved to several temporary locations in its early years, and Rockefeller eventually donated the land for its permanent site. In 1939, the museum moved to its current location on West 53rd Street designed by architects Philip L. Goodwin and Edward Durell Stone. A new sculpture garden, designed by Barr and curator John McAndrew, also opened that year.

From the 1930s through the 1950s, MoMA became a host to several landmark exhibitions, including Barr's influential "Cubism and Abstract Art" in 1936. Nelson Rockefeller became the museum's president in 1939, playing a key role in its expansion and publicity. David Rockefeller joined the board in 1948 and continued the family's close association with the museum until his death in 2017. In 1953, Philip Johnson redesigned the garden, which subsequently became the Abby Aldrich Rockefeller Sculpture Garden. In 1958, a fire at MoMA destroyed a painting by Claude Monet and led to the evacuation of other artworks. In later decades, the museum was among several institutions to aid the CIA in its efforts to engage in cultural propaganda during the Cold War. Major expansions in the 1980s and the early 21st century, including the selection of Japanese architect Yoshio Taniguchi for a significant renovation, nearly doubled MoMA's space for exhibitions and programs. The 2000s saw the formal merger with the P.S. 1 Contemporary Art Center, and in 2019, another major renovation added significant gallery space.

In recent decades, MoMA has expanded its collection and programming to include works by traditionally underrepresented groups. The museum has been involved in controversies regarding its labor practices, and the institution's labor union, founded in 1971, has been described as the first of its kind in the U.S. The MoMA Library includes about 300,000 books and exhibition catalogs, more than 1,000 periodical titles and more than 40,000 files of ephemera about individual artists and groups. The archives hold primary source material related to the history of modern and contemporary art.

== Attendance ==
The museum attracted 2,190,440 visitors in 2022, making it the 4th most-visited museum in the United States, and the third most-visited U.S. art museum. This attendance was 89 percent higher than in 2021, but still well below the pre-COVID attendance in 2019. In 2024, MoMA was visited by over 2.6 million people, making it the 13th most-visited art museum in the world and the 6th most-visited museum in the United States.

== History ==
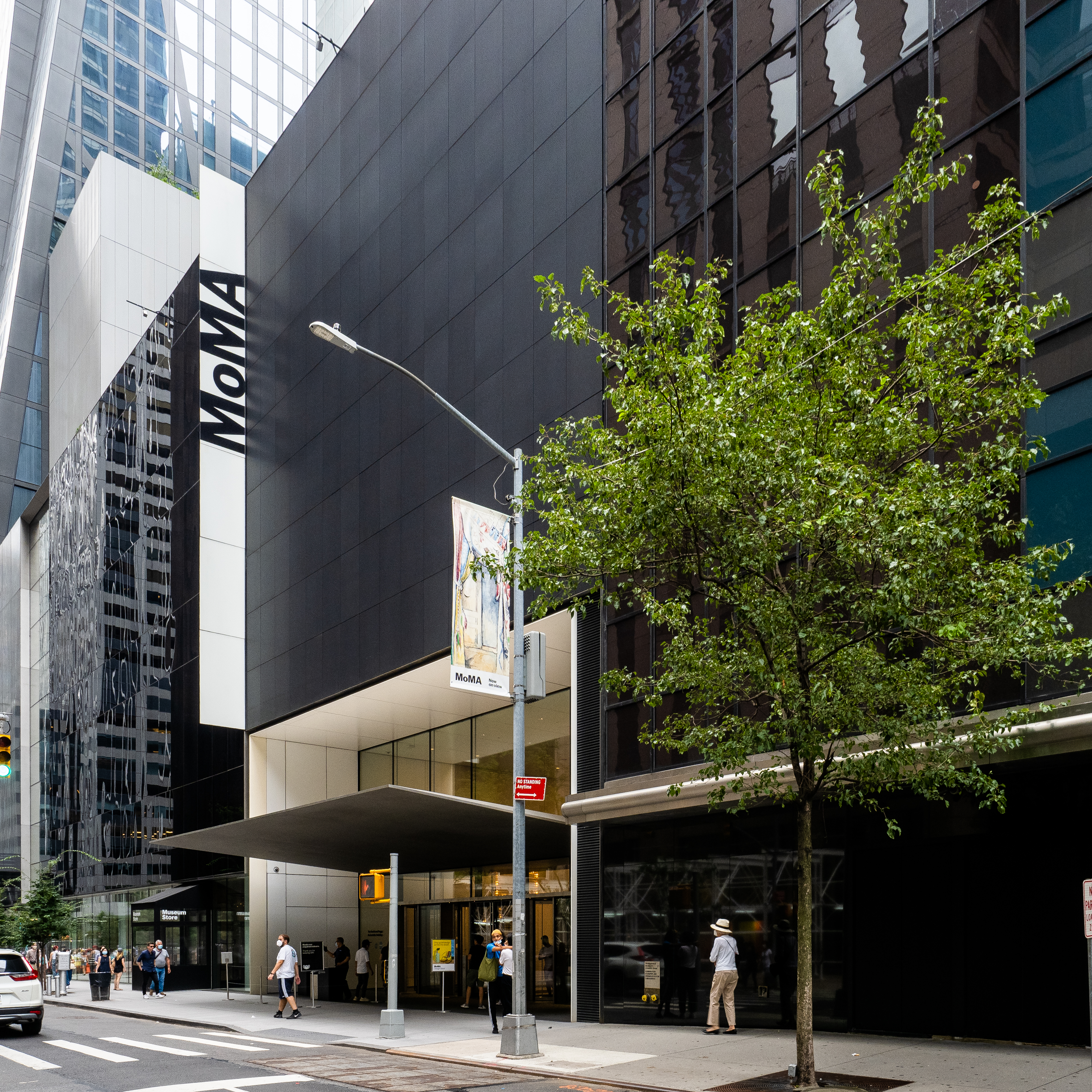
The museum's main entrance

=== Early years (1929–1939) ===
The idea for the Museum of Modern Art was developed in 1929 primarily by Abby Aldrich Rockefeller, wife of John D. Rockefeller Jr., and two of her friends, Lillie P. Bliss and Mary Quinn Sullivan. They became known variously as "the Ladies" or "the adamantine ladies". They rented modest quarters for the new museum in the Heckscher Building at 730 Fifth Avenue in Manhattan, and it opened to the public on November 7, 1929, nine days after the Wall Street Crash.

Abby Rockefeller had invited A. Conger Goodyear, the former president of the board of trustees of the Albright Art Gallery in Buffalo, New York, to become president of the new museum. Abby became treasurer. At the time, it was America's premier museum devoted exclusively to modern art, and the first of its kind in Manhattan to exhibit European modernism. One of Rockefeller's early recruits for the museum staff was the noted Japanese-American photographer Soichi Sunami (at that time best known for his portraits of modern dance pioneer Martha Graham), who served the museum as its official documentary photographer from 1930 until 1968.

Goodyear enlisted Paul J. Sachs and Frank Crowninshield to join him as founding trustees. Sachs, the associate director and curator of prints and drawings at the Fogg Museum at Harvard University, was referred to in those days as a "collector of curators". Goodyear asked him to recommend a director, and Sachs suggested Alfred H. Barr Jr., a promising young protégé. Under Barr's guidance, the museum's holdings quickly expanded from an initial gift of eight prints and one drawing. Its first successful loan exhibition was in November 1929, displaying paintings by Van Gogh, Gauguin, Cézanne, and Seurat.

First housed in six rooms of galleries and offices on the 12th floor of Manhattan's Heckscher Building, on the corner of Fifth Avenue and 57th Street, the museum moved into three more temporary locations within the next 10 years. Abby Rockefeller's husband, John D. Rockefeller Jr., was adamantly opposed to the museum (as well as to modern art itself) and refused to release funds for the venture, which had to be obtained from other sources and resulted in the frequent shifts of location. Nevertheless, he eventually donated the land for the current site of the museum, plus other gifts over time, and thus became in effect one of its greatest benefactors. Under Alfred H. Barr Jr.'s direction, MoMA embraced a multidisciplinary approach to modern art by being the first museum to establish departments dedicated to photography and film.

During that time, the museum initiated many more exhibitions of noted artists, such as the lone Vincent van Gogh exhibition on November 4, 1935. Containing an unprecedented 66 oils and 50 drawings from the Netherlands, as well as poignant excerpts from the artist's letters, it was a major public success due to Barr's arrangement of the exhibit, and became "a precursor to the hold van Gogh has to this day on the contemporary imagination".

=== 1930s to 1950s ===
The museum also gained international prominence with the hugely successful and now famous Picasso retrospective of 1939–1940, held in conjunction with the Art Institute of Chicago. In its range of presented works, it represented a significant reinterpretation of Picasso for future art scholars and historians. This was wholly masterminded by Barr, a Picasso enthusiast, and the exhibition lionized Picasso as the greatest artist of the time, setting the model for all the museum's retrospectives that were to follow. Boy Leading a Horse was briefly contested over ownership by the Solomon R. Guggenheim Museum.

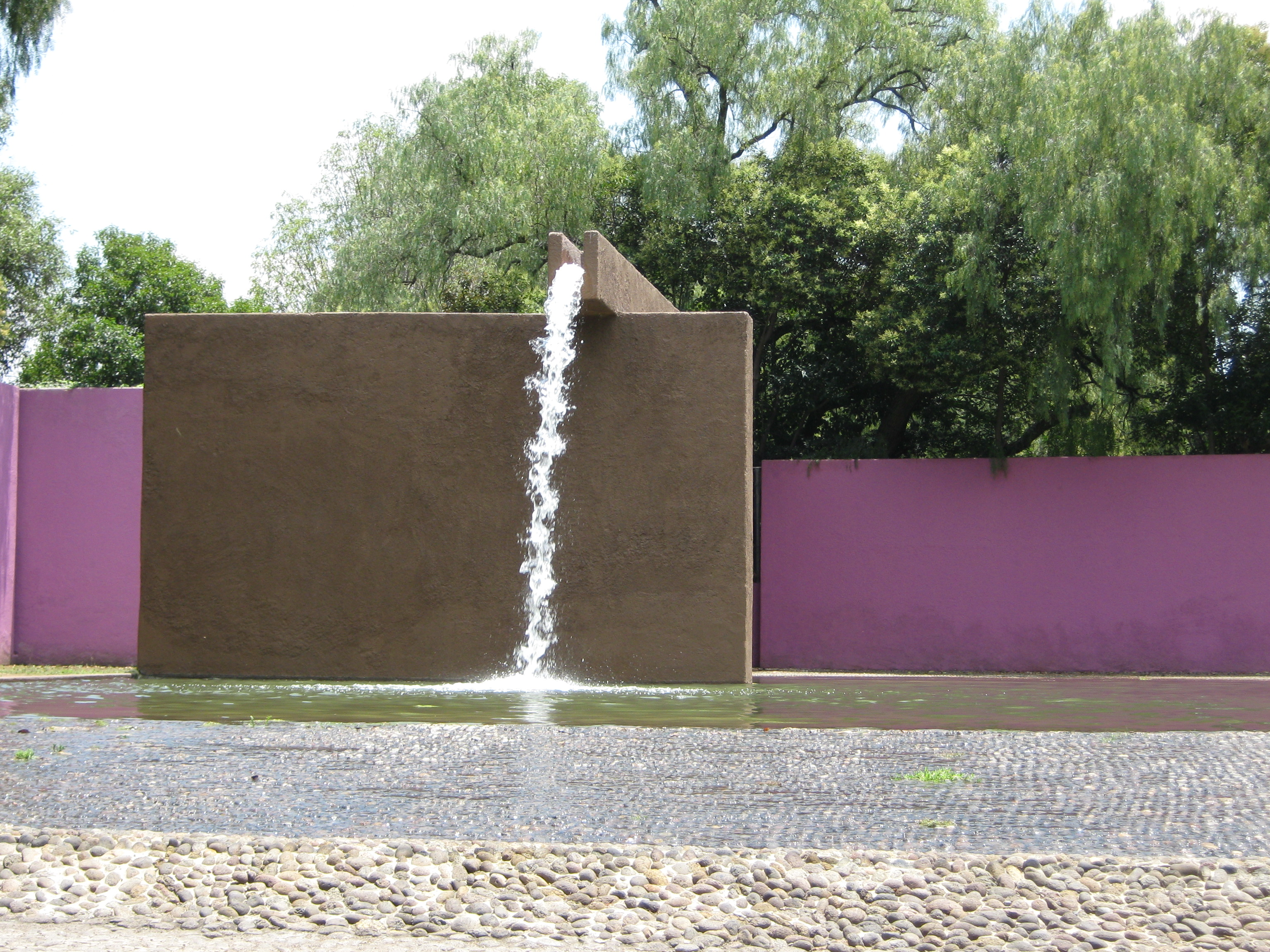
The modern Lovers' Fountain in the northwest of Mexico City by Luis Barragán

In 1941, MoMA hosted the ground-breaking exhibition, "Indian Art of the United States", curated by Frederic Huntington Douglas and Rene d'Harnoncourt, that changed the way Native American arts were viewed by the public and exhibited in art museums. The exhibition "Latin American Architecture Since 1945" was opened to the public in November 1955. The exhibition reflected the construction boom in Latin America since 1945. Recent works by architects such as Juan O'Gorman, Mario Pani, Roberto Burle Marx, Luis Barragán, Max Cetto, and Oscar Niemeyer were showcased.

Abby Rockefeller's son Nelson was selected by the board of trustees to become its president, in 1939, at the age of 30; he was a flamboyant leader and became the prime instigator and funding source of MoMA's publicity, acquisitions, and subsequent expansion into new headquarters on 53rd Street. His brother, David Rockefeller, joined the museum's board of trustees in 1948, and took over the presidency when Nelson was elected governor of New York in 1958. David Rockefeller subsequently employed noted architect Philip Johnson to redesign the museum garden, and named it in honor of his mother, the Abby Aldrich Rockefeller Sculpture Garden. The Rockefeller family and he have retained a close association with the museum throughout its history, with the Rockefeller Brothers Fund funding the institution since 1947. Both David Rockefeller Jr. and Sharon Percy Rockefeller (wife of former senator Jay Rockefeller) sit on the board of trustees. After the Rockefeller Guest House at 242 East 52nd Street was completed in 1950, some MoMA functions were held in the house until 1964.

In 1937, MoMA had shifted to offices and basement galleries in the Time-Life Building in Rockefeller Center. Its permanent and current home, now renovated, designed in the International Style by the modernist architects Philip L. Goodwin and Edward Durell Stone, opened to the public on May 10, 1939, attended by an illustrious company of 6,000 people, and with an opening address via radio from the White House by President Franklin D. Roosevelt.

In 1958, workers re-clad the MoMA building's second floor with a glass facade overlooking the sculpture garden.

=== 1958 fire ===
On April 15, 1958, a fire on the second floor destroyed an 18-foot-long (5.5 m) Monet Water Lilies painting (the current Monet Water Lilies was acquired shortly after the fire as a replacement). The fire was started by workmen installing air conditioning, who were smoking near paint cans, sawdust, and a canvas drop cloth. One worker was killed by the fire, and several firefighters were treated for smoke inhalation.

Most of the paintings on the floor had previously been removed from the work area, although large paintings including the Monet had remained in place. Art works on the third and fourth floors were evacuated to the Whitney Museum of American Art, which abutted on the 54th Street side. Among the paintings that were rescued was A Sunday Afternoon on the Island of La Grande Jatte, which had been on loan from the Art Institute of Chicago. Visitors and employees trapped above the fire were evacuated to the roof, and then jumped to the roof of an adjoining townhouse.

=== 1960s to 1980s ===
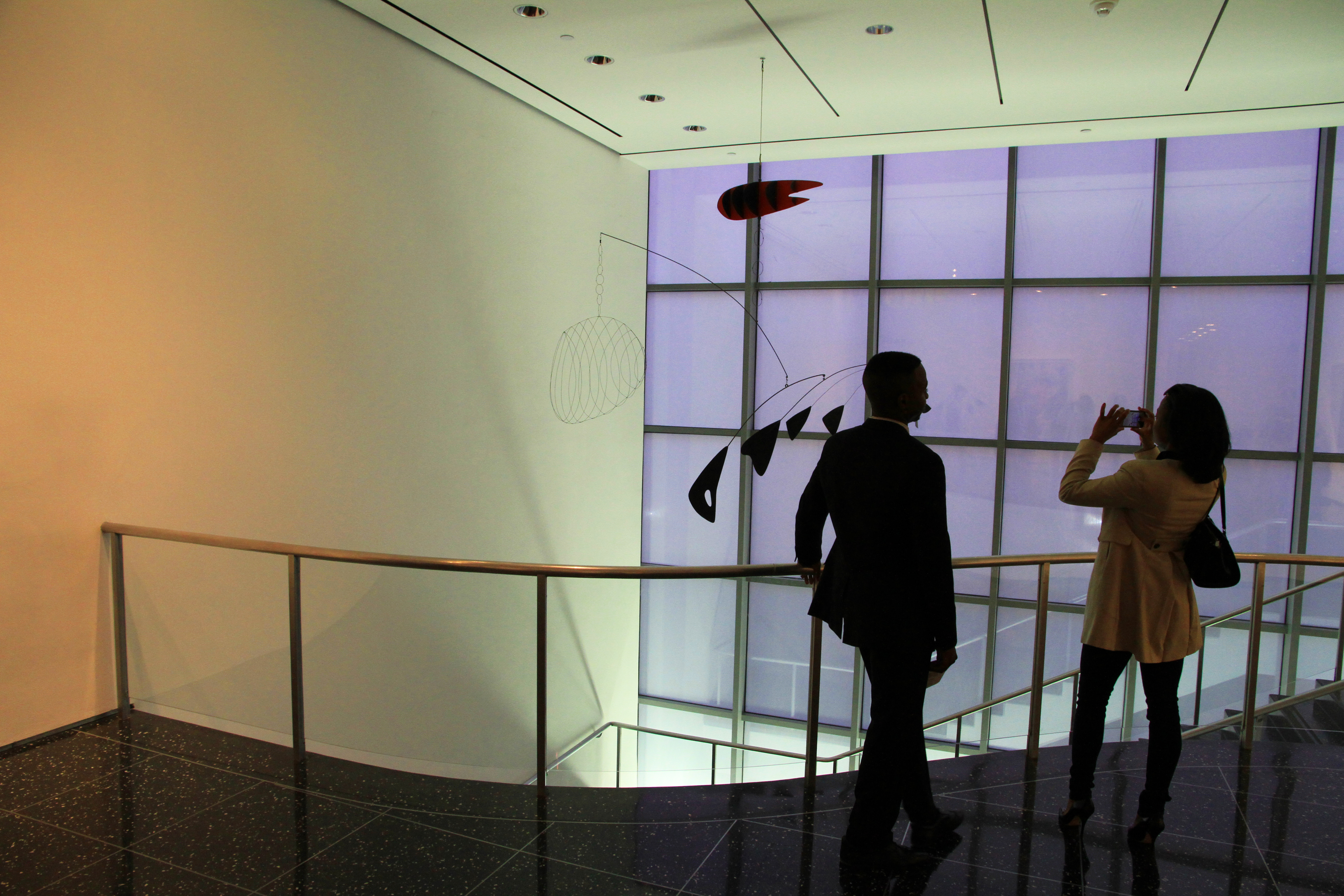
Stairs in the Museum of Modern Art

In 1969, the MoMA was at the center of a controversy over its decision to withdraw funding from the iconic antiwar poster And Babies. In 1969, the Art Workers Coalition, a group of New York City artists who opposed the Vietnam War, in collaboration with Museum of Modern Art members Arthur Drexler and Elizabeth Shaw, created an iconic protest poster called And babies. The poster uses an image by photojournalist Ronald L. Haeberle and references the My Lai Massacre. The MoMA had promised to fund and circulate the poster, but after seeing the 2-by-3-foot (0.61 m × 0.91 m) poster, MoMA pulled financing for the project at the last minute. MoMA's board of trustees included Nelson Rockefeller and William S. Paley (head of CBS), who reportedly "hit the ceiling" on seeing the proofs of the poster. The poster was included shortly thereafter in MoMA's Information exhibition of July 2 to September 20, 1970, curated by Kynaston McShine.

In 1971, after protests outside the museum meant to spur inclusion of African Americans Richard Hunt was the first African American sculptor to have a major solo retrospective at the museum.

In 1983, the museum more than doubled its gallery space, increased the curatorial department by 30%, and added an auditorium, two restaurants, and a bookstore in conjunction with the construction of the 56-story Museum Tower adjoining the museum. Architect César Pelli led the design project for the expansion. Despite these expansion projects, MoMA's physical space had never been able to accommodate its growing collection.

On June 14, 1984, the Women Artists Visibility Event (W.A.V.E.), a demonstration of 400 women artists, was held in front of the newly renovated Museum of Modern Art to protest the lack of female representation in its opening exhibition, "An International Survey of Recent Painting and Sculpture". The exhibition featured 165 artists. Only 14 of those were women.

=== 1990s and 2000s renovation ===
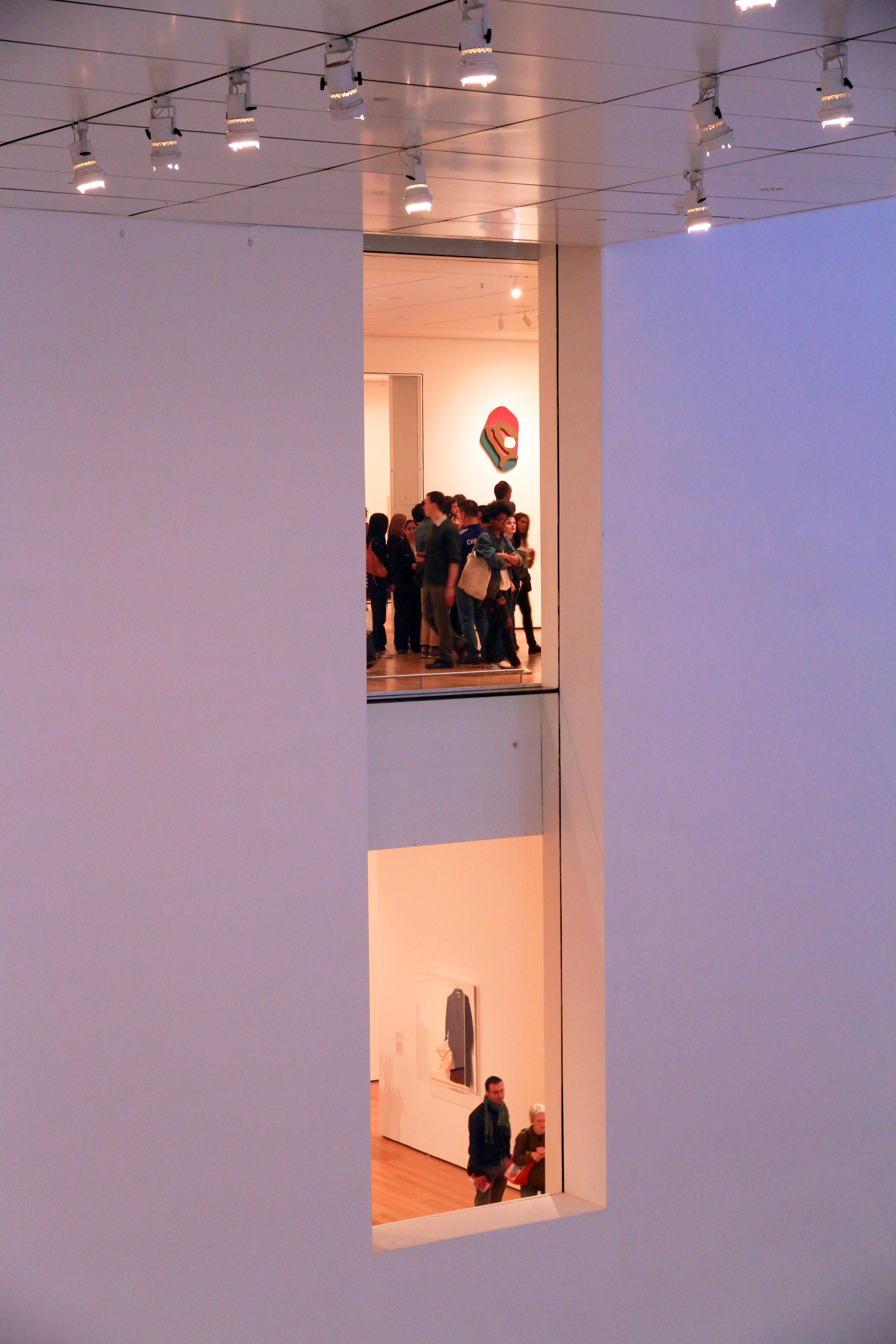
Cross-section of the Museum of Modern Art

By the end of the 20th century, MoMA had 100,000 objects in its collection, an increase from the 40,000 items it had in 1970. After the Dorset Hotel adjacent to the museum was placed for sale in 1996, MoMA quickly purchased it. The next year, the museum began planning a major renovation and expansion, selecting Japanese architect Yoshio Taniguchi in December 1997. The project nearly doubled the space for MoMA's exhibitions and programs, and features 630,000 square feet (59,000 m^{2}) of space. Taniguchi's initial plan called for two structures, one each to the west and east of the Abby Aldrich Rockefeller Sculpture Garden, which was to be enlarged from its original configuration. The Peggy and David Rockefeller Building on the western portion of the site houses the main exhibition gallerie, while the Lewis B. and Dorothy Cullman Education and Research Building provides space for classrooms, auditoriums, teacher-training workshops, and the museum's expanded library and archives.

MoMA began the year 2000 with the activation of a 1999 agreement formalizing its affiliation with the P.S. 1 Contemporary Art Center, an independent contemporary art organization which had been founded in nearby Long Island City, Queens, New York in 1971. An agreement provided for a 10-year merger process, allowing gradual coordination and consolidation of programming and staff. The location in Queens, a re-purposed former public school, would remain open to the public indefinitely, as an experimental exhibition and performance space. In addition, the PS1 space would be available while the 53rd Street complex was closed for major renovations.

MoMA broke ground on the 53rd Street project in May 2001. Over the next year, the museum gradually closed two-thirds of its galleries and moved some of its exhibits online. The Midtown building closed completely in May 2002; the next month, MoMA relocated its public-facing operations to a temporary facility called MoMA QNS in Long Island City, Queens.

The overall project, including an increase in MoMA's endowment to cover operating expenses, cost $858 million in total; the renovation of the Midtown Manhattan building alone cost $425 million. During the project, new gallery space was added on the first floor of the adjacent Museum Tower, and mechanical spaces and equipment within the tower were added or relocated. MoMA reopened on November 20, 2004.

The renovation received mixed reception. John Updike wrote in The New Yorker that the new structure "has the enchantment of a bank after hours, of a honeycomb emptied of honey and flooded with a soft glow", while Roberta Smith of The New York Times said MoMA had an "overly refined building, whose poor layout shortchanges the world's greatest collection of Modern art". Witold Rybczynski of Slate wrote: "Most of what has been written about the new MoMA has lauded its minimalist interiors, which, even if they don't exactly disappear, have an opulently ethereal quality. [...] Yet this urban building is not experienced only from inside—and, seen from the sidewalk, Taniguchi's architecture does anything but fade away."

MoMA, which owned a 17,000 ft^{2} (1,600 m^{2}) lot at 53 West 53rd Street west of its existing building, sold it to developer Gerald D. Hines for $125 million in January 2007. Hines planned to build a skyscraper called Tower Verre on the site. Work on the tower was delayed because of a lack of funding following the Great Recession.

=== 2010s to present ===
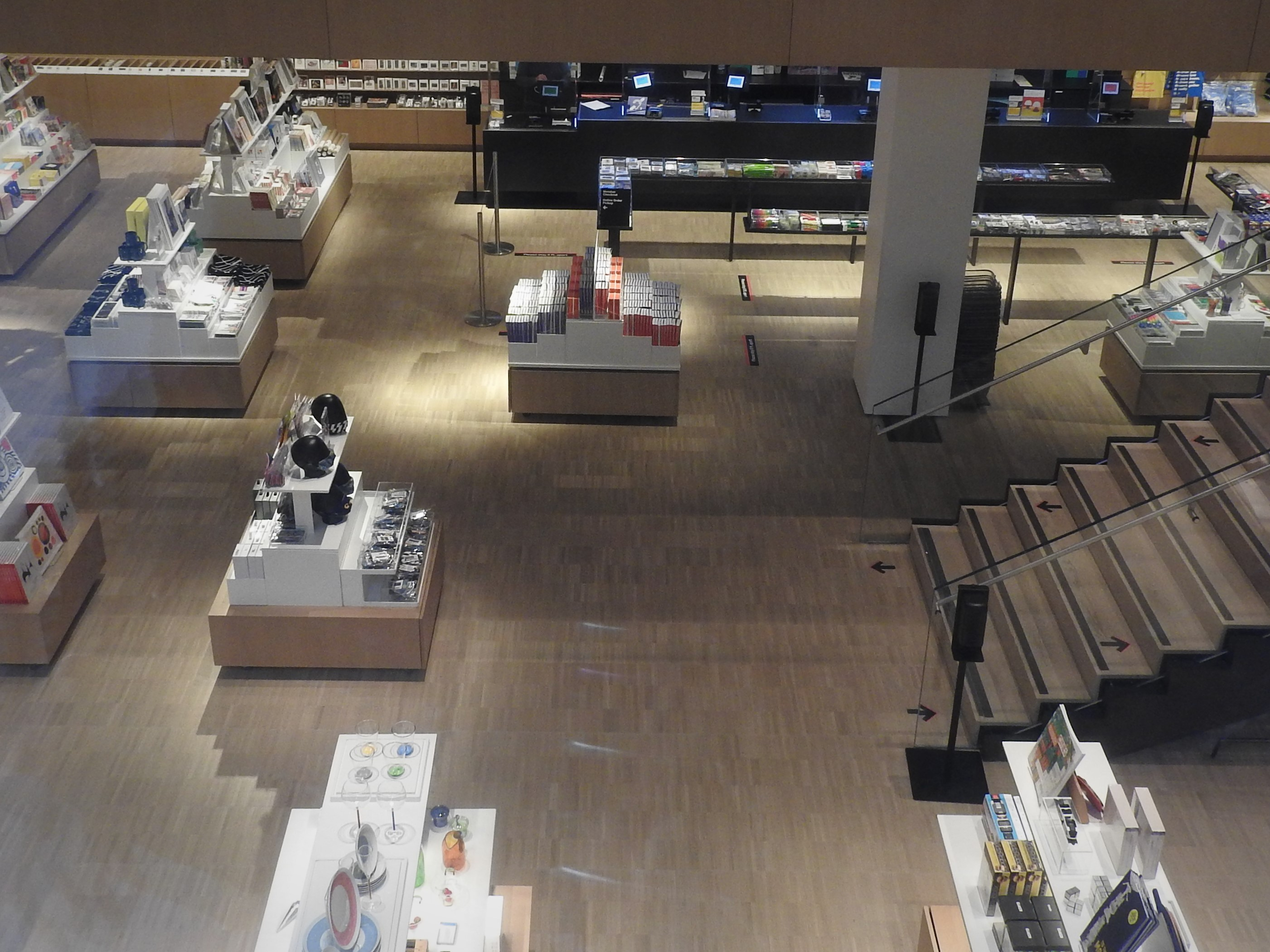
The museum's basement gift shop

In 2010, MoMA completed its merger with the P.S. 1 Contemporary Art Center in Long Island City, New York, formally renaming it as MoMA PS1.

In 2011, MoMA acquired an adjacent building that housed the American Folk Art Museum on West 53rd Street. The building had been completed in 2001 to designs by Tod Williams Billie Tsien Architects and was sold in connection with a financial restructuring of the Folk Art Museum. In January 2014, MoMA decided to raze the American Folk Art Museum, which was between MoMA's existing structure and the proposed tower at 53 West 53rd Street. The architectural community protested the planned demolition in part because that building was relatively new, having been completed in 2001. MoMA decided to proceed with the demolition because the American Folk Art Museum was in the way of MoMA's planned expansion, which included exhibition space within 53 West 53rd Street. The tower, designed by Jean Nouvel and called 53W53, received construction approval in 2014.

Around the same time as 53W53 was approved, MoMA unveiled its expansion plans, which encompass space in 53W53, as well as an annex on the former site of the American Folk Art Museum. The expansion plan was developed by the architecture firm Diller Scofidio + Renfro in collaboration with Gensler. Following a controversy over the plans, MoMA split the plan into three phases in January 2016. The plan added 50,000 square feet (4,600 m^{2}) of gallery space to 53W53, in a new annex designed by Diller Scofidio + Renfro, and in the existing building, as well as expanded lobbies. In June 2017, the first phase of the $450 million expansion was completed.

Spread over three floors of the art mecca off Fifth Avenue are 15,000 square-feet (about 1,400 m^{2}) of reconfigured galleries, a new, second gift shop, a redesigned cafe and espresso bar, and facing the sculpture garden, two lounges graced with black marble quarried in France.

The museum expansion project increased the publicly accessible space by 25% compared to when the Tanaguchi building was completed in 2004. The expansion allowed for even more of the museum's collection of nearly 200,000 works to be displayed. The new spaces also allow visitors to enjoy a relaxing sit-down in one of the two new lounges, or even have a fully catered meal. The two new lounges include "The Marlene Hess and James D. Zirin Lounge" and "The Daniel and Jane Och Lounge". The goal of this renovation is to help expand the collection and display of work by women, Latinos, Blacks, Asians, and other marginalized communities. In connection with the renovation, MoMA shifted its approach to presenting its holdings, moving away from separating the collection by disciplines such as painting, design, and works on paper toward an integrated chronological presentation that encompasses all areas of the collection.

The Museum of Modern Art closed for another round of major renovations from June to October 2019. Upon reopening on October 21, 2019, MoMA added 47,000 square feet (4,400 m^{2}) of gallery space, bringing its total floor area to 708,000 square feet (65,800 m^{2}).

Leon Black was the chairman of the Museum of Modern Art from 2018 to 2021. Black resigned from the museum in the wake of revelations about his business ties to the New York financier and child sex offender, Jeffrey Epstein.

== Exhibition houses ==
The MoMA occasionally has sponsored and hosted temporary exhibition houses, which have reflected seminal ideas in architectural history.

- 1949: exhibition house by Marcel Breuer; relocated in 1950 and now the Marcel Breuer House at Pocantico
- 1950: exhibition house by Gregory Ain
- 1955: Japanese Exhibition House by Junzo Yoshimura, reinstalled in Philadelphia, PA in 1957–58 and known now as Shofuso Japanese House and Garden
- 2008: Prefabricated houses planned by:
  - KieranTimberlake Architects
  - Larry Sass
  - System Architects (Jeremy Edmiston and Douglas Gauthier)
  - Leo Kaufmann Architects
  - Richard Horden

== Collections ==
Pablo Picasso's 1907 portrait Les Demoiselles d'Avignon

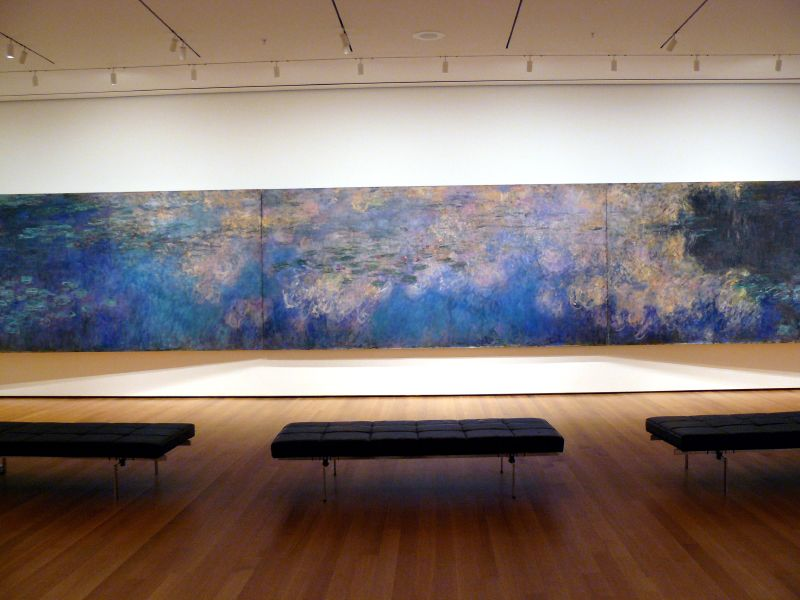
Claude Monet's early 20th century landscape Reflections of Clouds on the Water-Lily Pond

The MoMA is organized around six curatorial departments: Architecture and Design, Drawings and Prints, Film, Media and Performance, Painting and Sculpture, and Photography.

The MoMA's holdings include more than 150,000 individual pieces in addition to roughly 22,000 films and 4 million film stills. (Access to the collection of film stills ended in 2002, and the collection is stored in a vault in Hamlin, Pennsylvania.). The collection houses such important and familiar works as the following:

- Andy Warhol, Campbell's Soup Cans
- Andrew Wyeth, Christina's World
- Barnett Newman, Broken Obelisk
- Barnett Newman, Vir Heroicus Sublimis (Man, Heroic and Sublime)
- Claude Monet, Water Lilies triptych
- Francis Bacon, Painting 1946
- Frida Kahlo, Self-Portrait With Cropped Hair
- Giorgio de Chirico, The Song of Love
- Gustav Klimt, Hope II
- Henri Matisse, The Dance
- Henri Matisse, The Red Studio
- Henri Rousseau, The Dream, 1910
- Henri Rousseau, The Sleeping Gypsy
- Jackson Pollock, One: Number 31, 1950
- Jasper Johns, Flag
- Kazimir Malevich, White on White 1918
- Marc Chagall, I and the Village
- Max Ernst, Two Children Are Threatened by a Nightingale
- Pablo Picasso, Les Demoiselles d'Avignon
- Pablo Picasso, Three Musicians
- Paul Cézanne, The Bather
- Paul Gauguin, Te aa no areois (The Seed of the Areoi)
- Piet Mondrian, Broadway Boogie Woogie
- René Magritte, The False Mirror
- René Magritte, The Empire of Light II
- Richard Hunt, Arachne
- Roy Lichtenstein, Drowning Girl
- Salvador Dalí, The Persistence of Memory
- Umberto Boccioni, The City Rises
- Vincent van Gogh, The Starry Night
- Willem de Kooning, Woman I

== Selected collection highlights ==
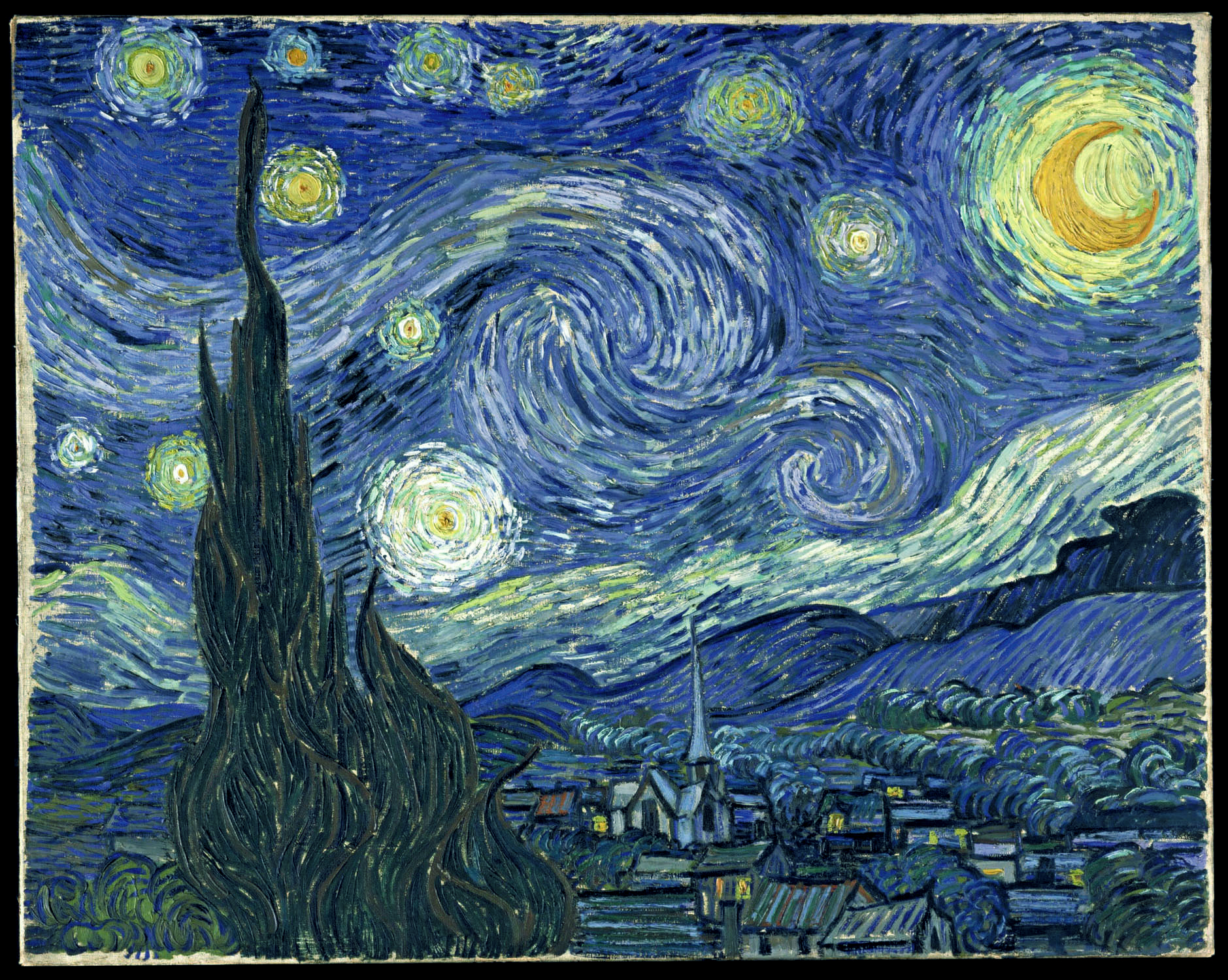
Vincent van Gogh, The Starry Night, 1889

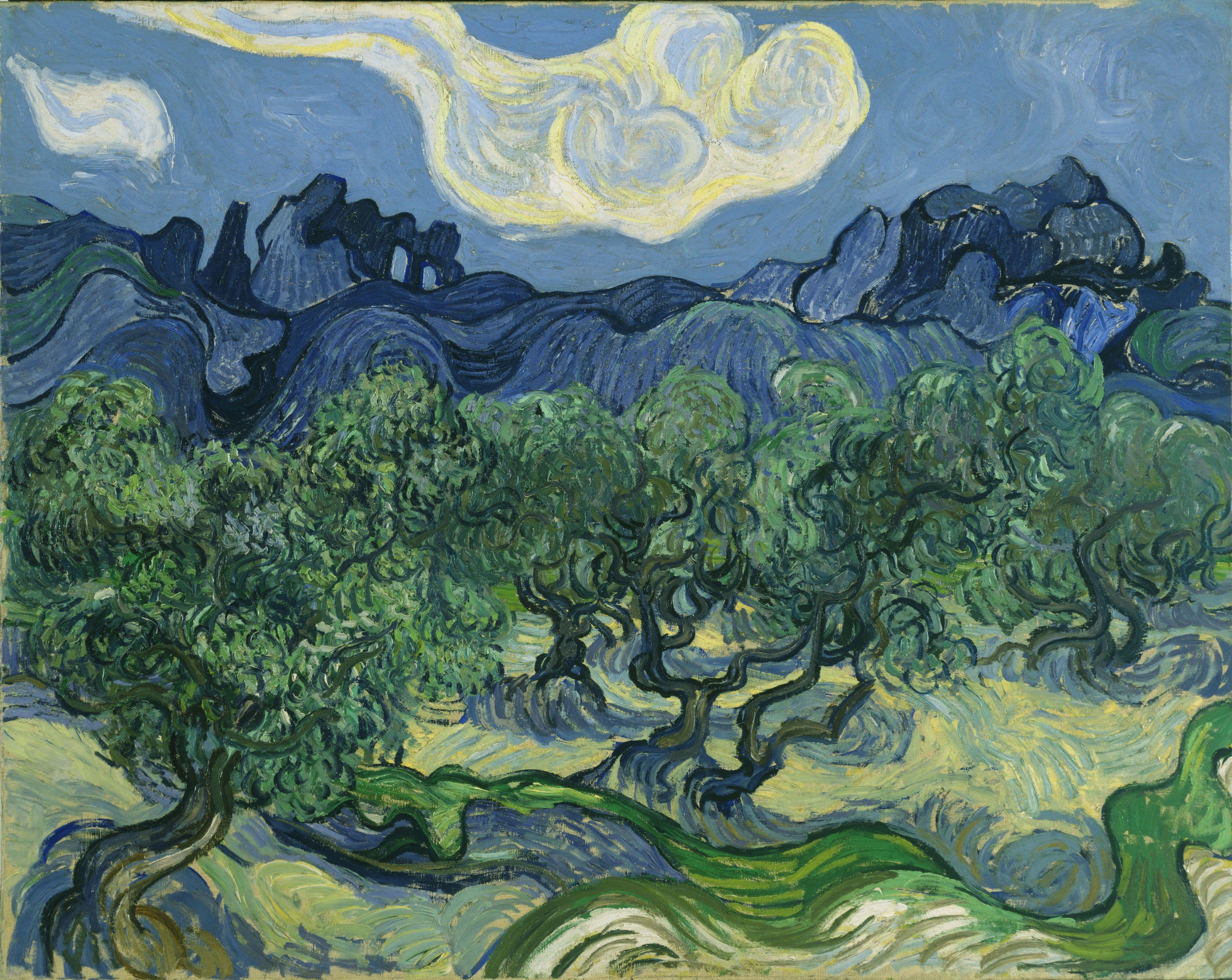
Vincent van Gogh, The Olive Trees with the Alpilles in the Background, 1889

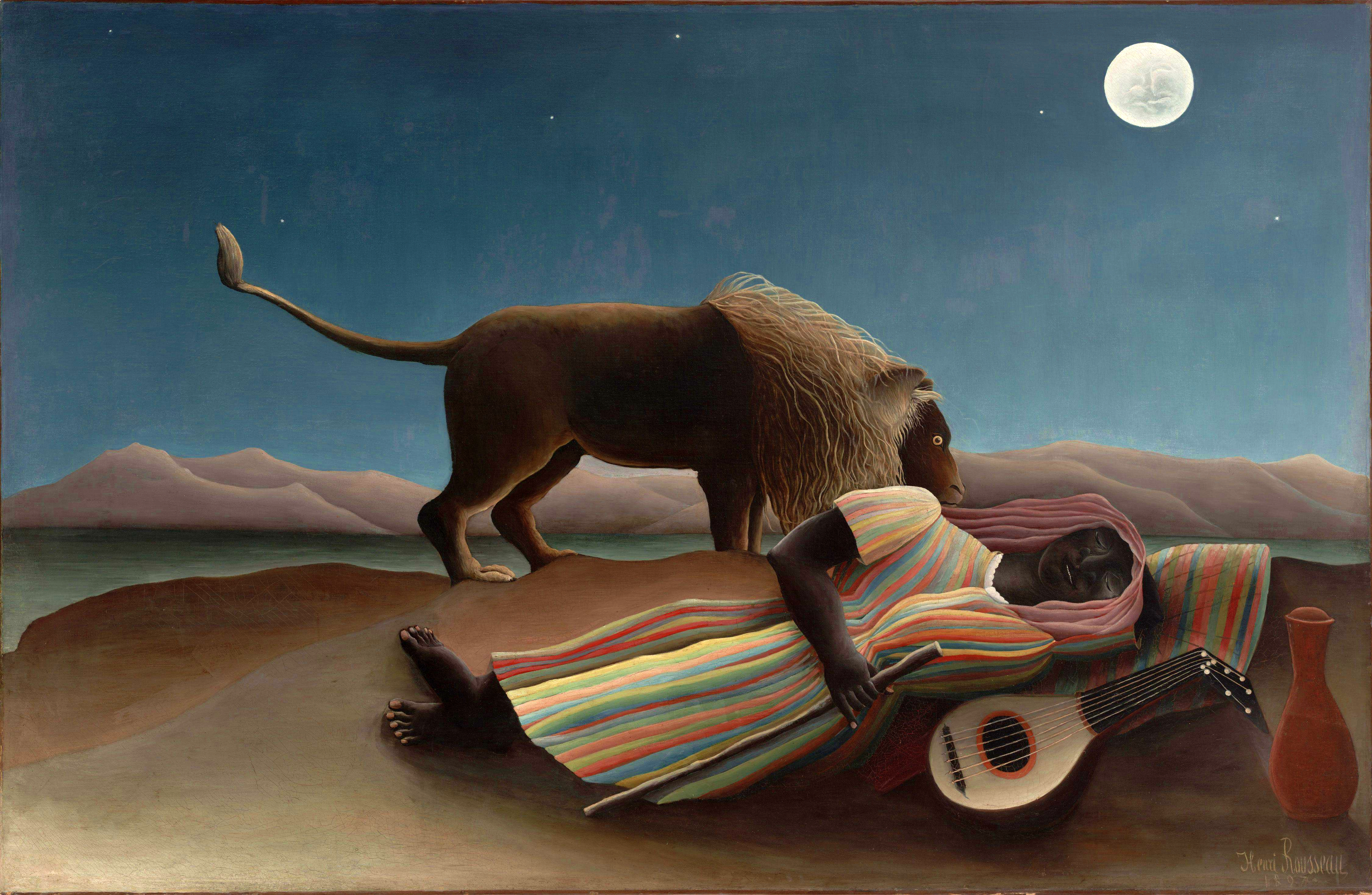
Henri Rousseau, The Sleeping Gypsy, 1897

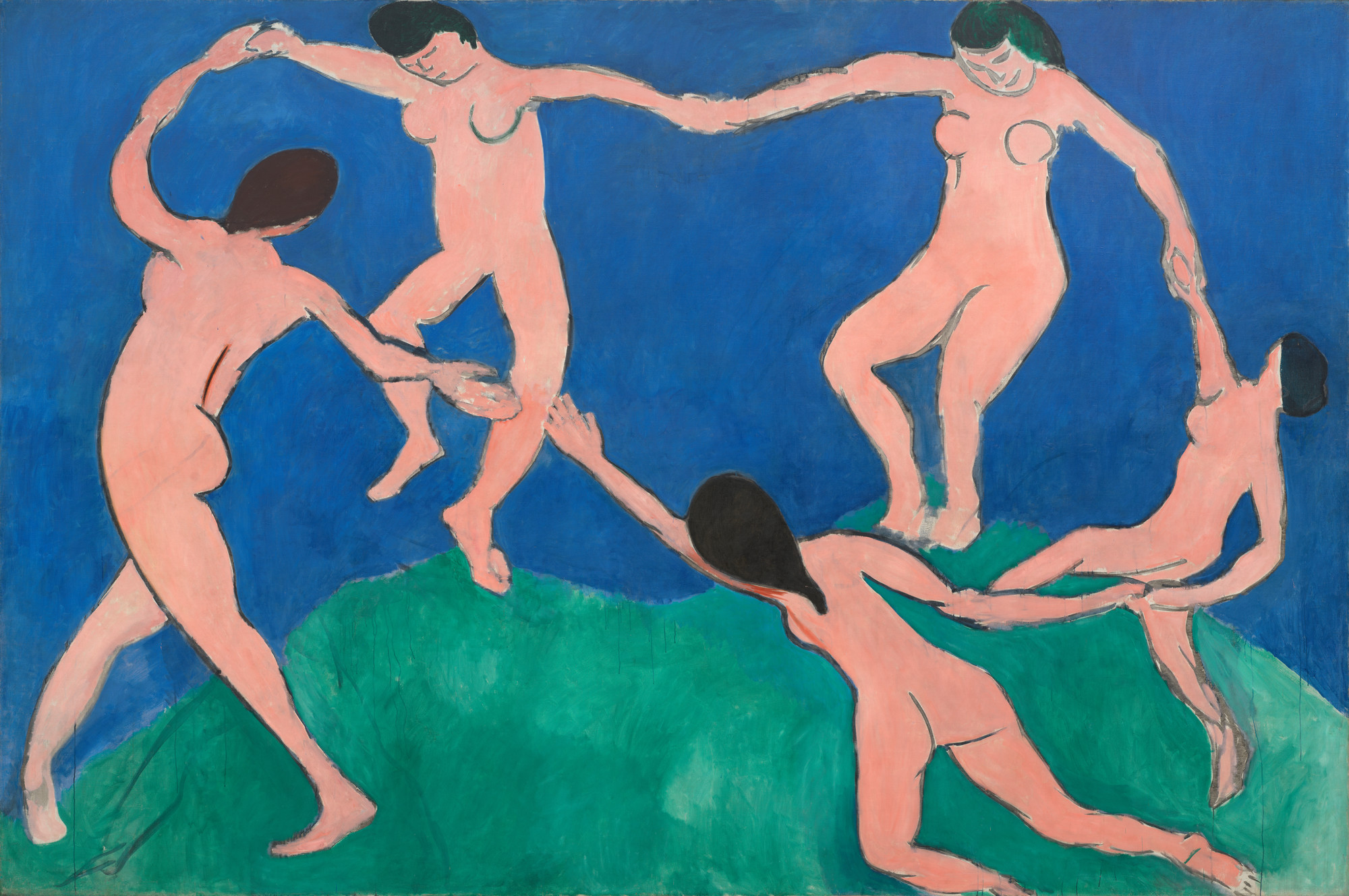
Henri Matisse, The Dance I, 1909

Pablo Picasso, Three Musicians, 1921

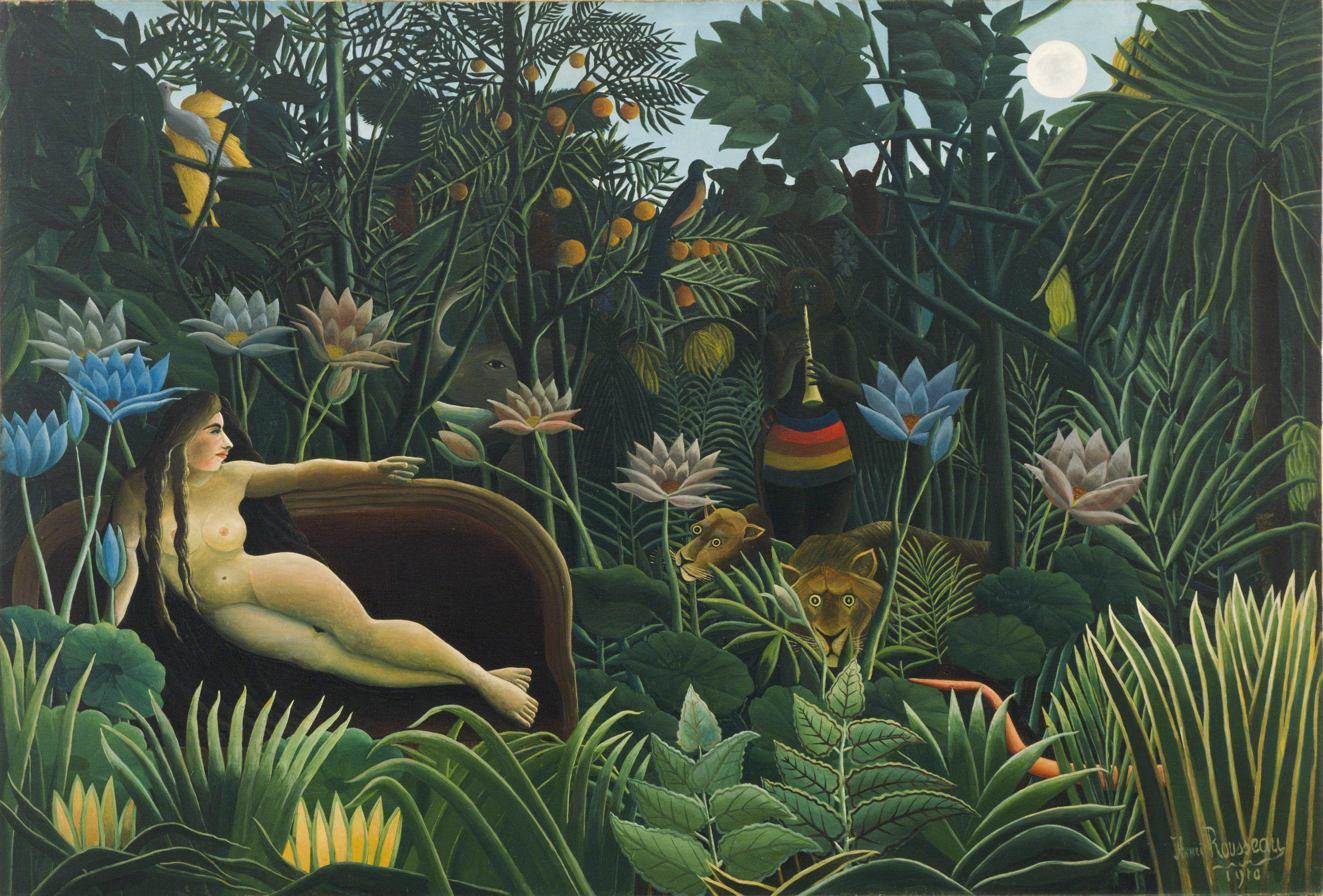
Henri Rousseau, The Dream, 1910

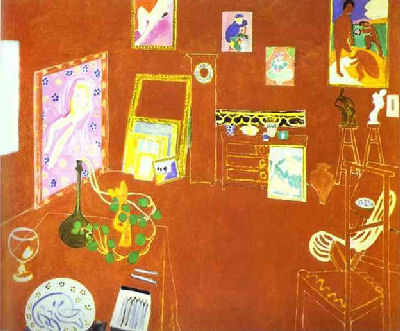
Henri Matisse, L'Atelier Rouge, 1911

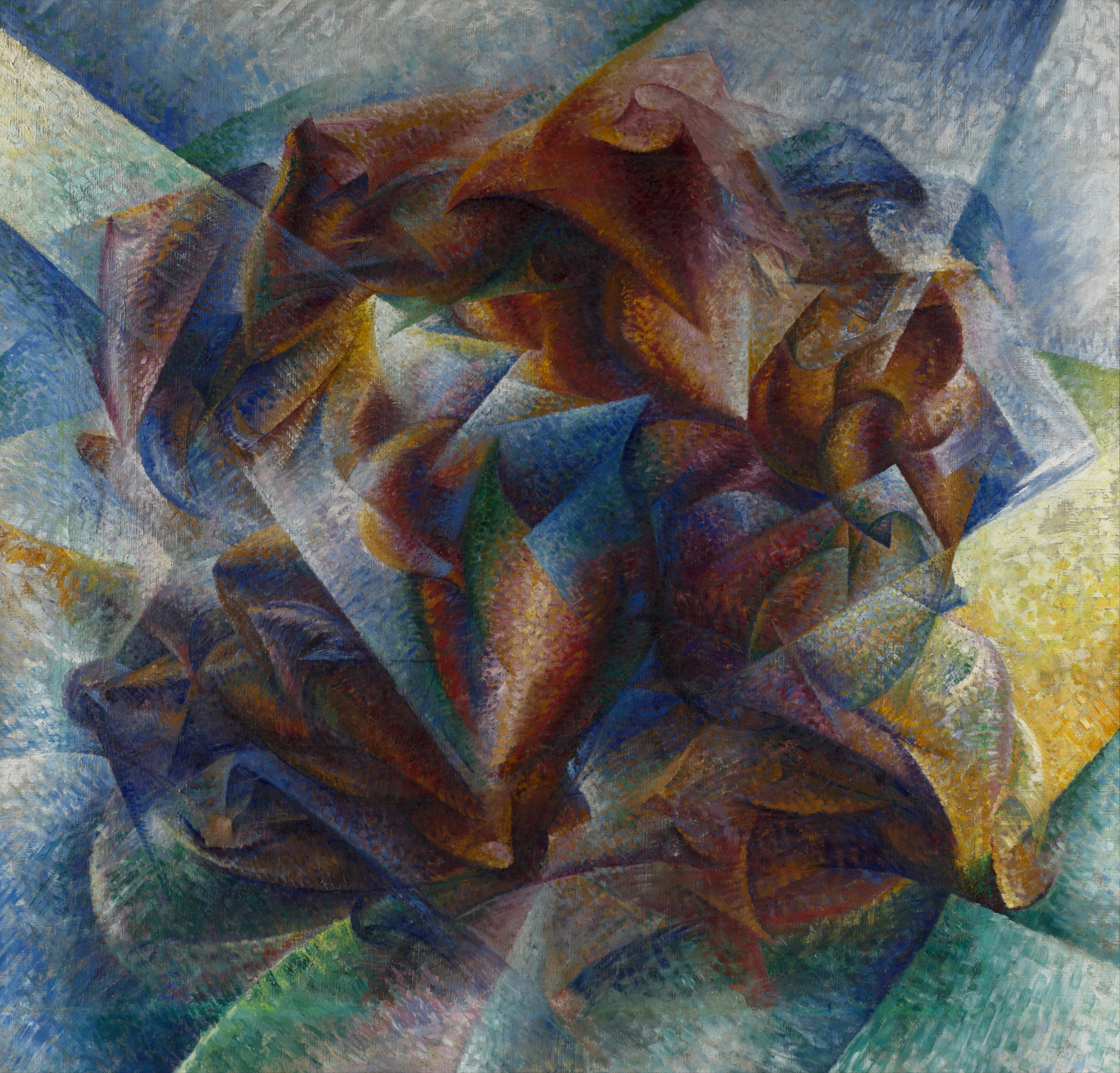
Umberto Boccioni, Dynamism of a Soccer Player, 1913

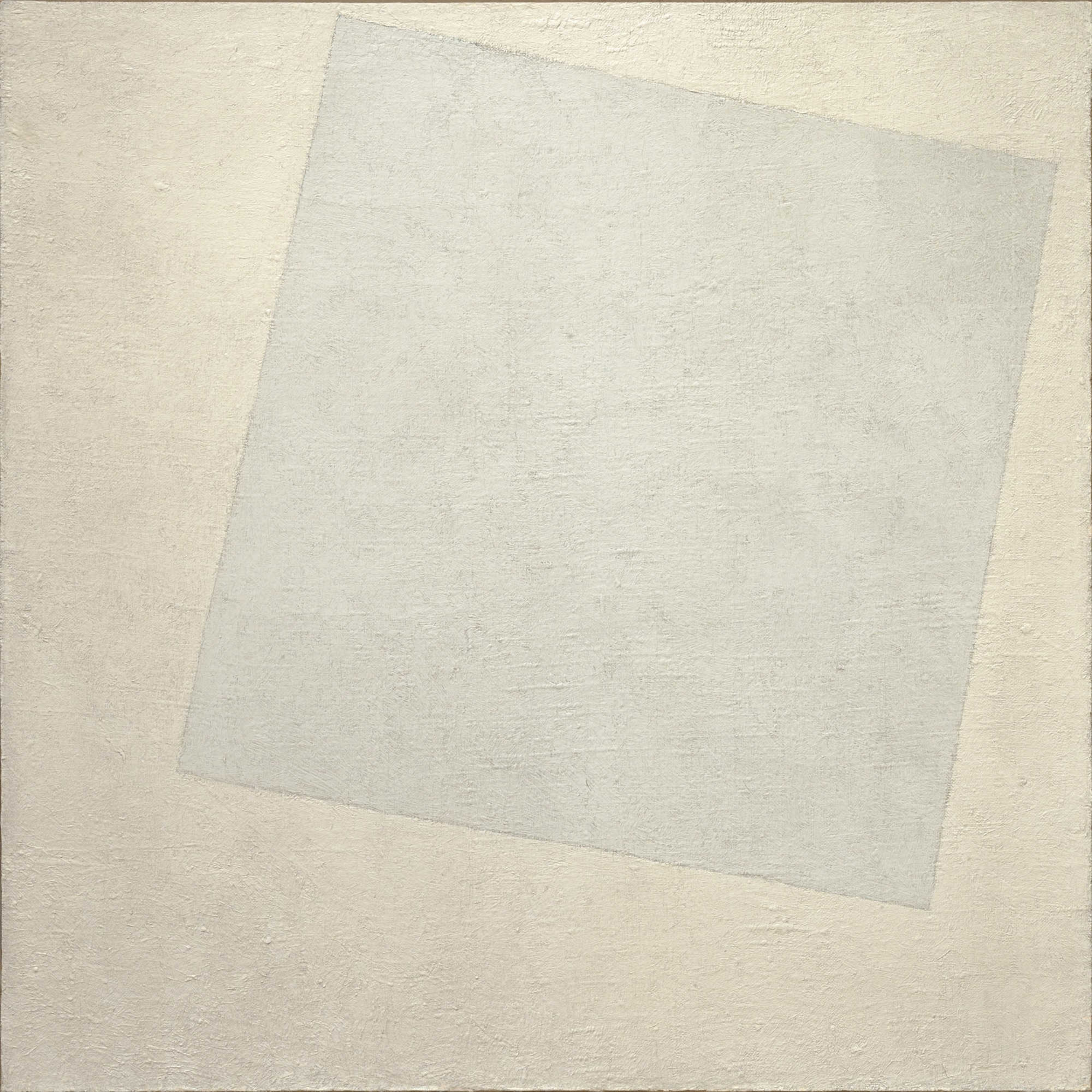
Kazimir Malevich, Suprematist Composition: White on White, 1918

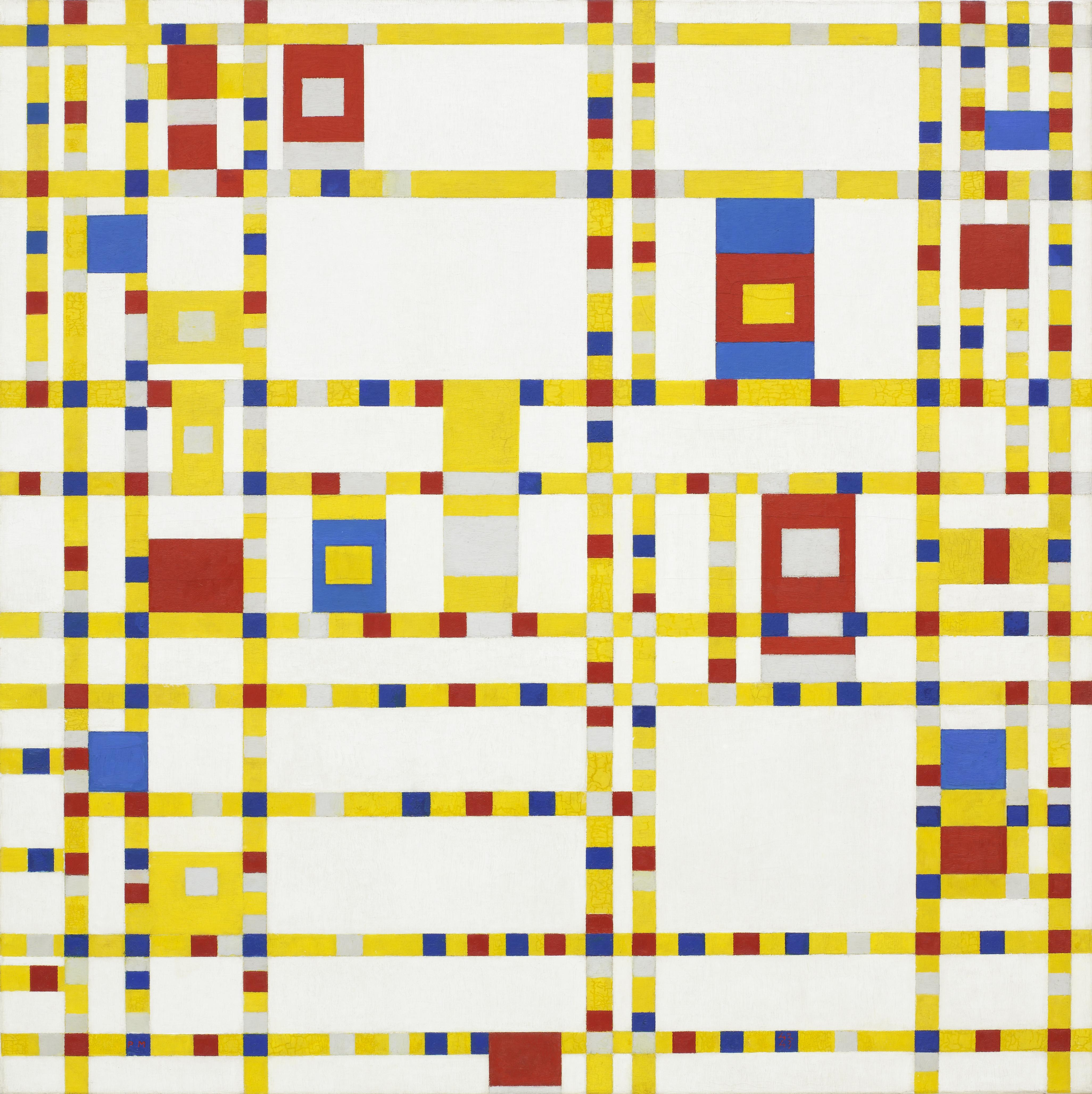
Piet Mondrian, Broadway Boogie Woogie, 1942–1943

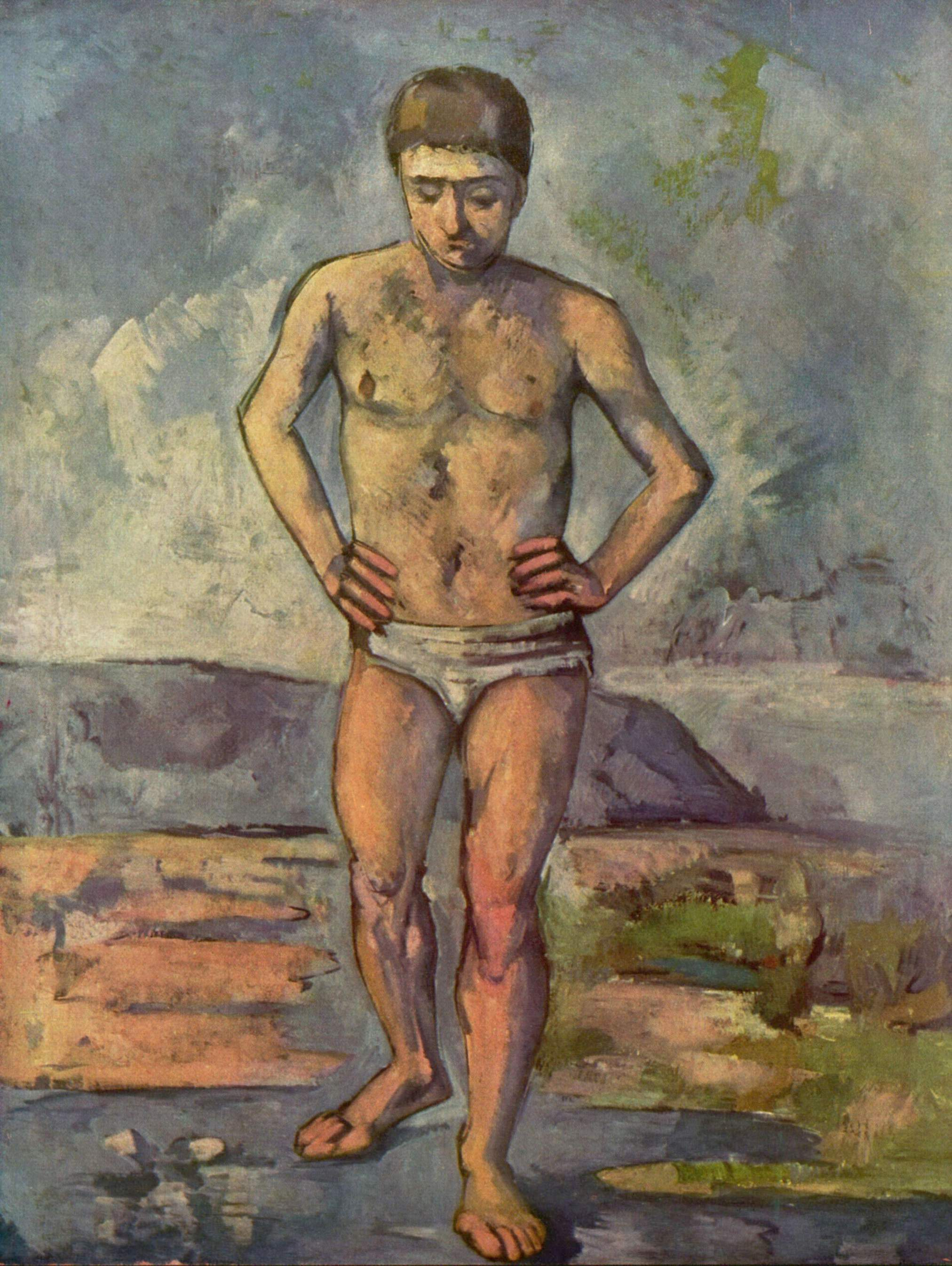
Paul Cézanne, The Bather, 1885–1887

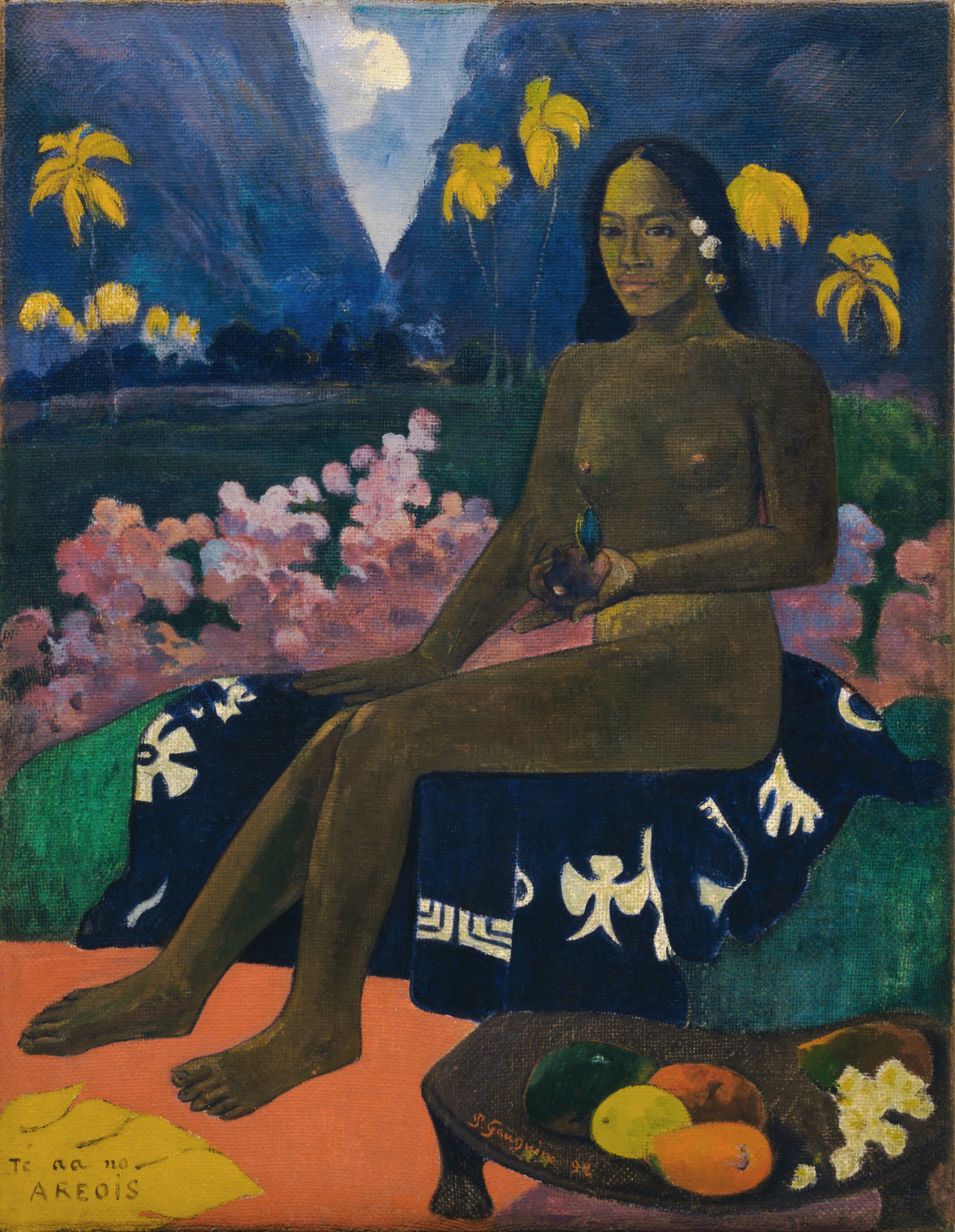
Paul Gauguin, Te aa no areois (The Seed of the Areoi), 1892

Pablo Picasso, Boy Leading a Horse, 1905–06

Marc Chagall, I and the Village, 1911

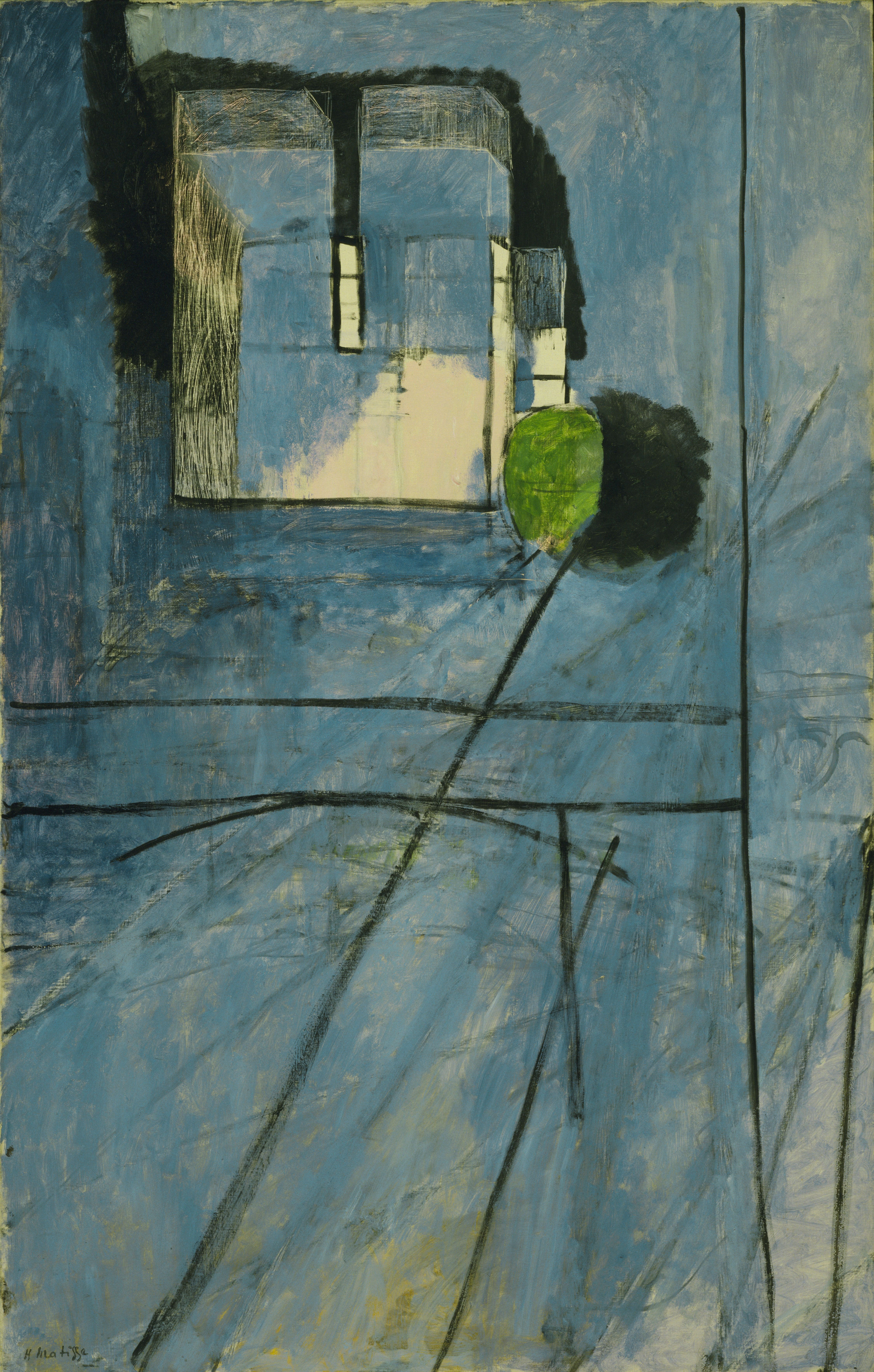
Henri Matisse, View of Notre-Dame, 1914

Giorgio de Chirico, Love Song, 1914

René Magritte, The False Mirror, 1929

It also holds works by a wide range of influential European and American artists including Auguste Rodin, Henri Matisse, Pablo Picasso, Georges Braque, Joan Miró, Aristide Maillol, Piet Mondrian, Marcel Duchamp, Paul Klee, Fernand Léger, Seraphine Louis, René Magritte, Henry Moore, Alberto Giacometti, Georgia O'Keeffe, Morris Hirshfield, Edward Hopper, Walker Evans, Dorothea Lange, Arshile Gorky, Hans Hofmann, Franz Kline, Willem de Kooning, Jackson Pollock, Mark Rothko, David Smith, Helen Frankenthaler, Morris Louis, Kenneth Noland, Robert Rauschenberg, Frank Stella, Andy Warhol, Bill Traylor, Roy Lichtenstein, Jean-Michel Basquiat and hundreds of others.

=== Photography ===
The MoMA photography collection consists of over 25,000 works by photographers, journalists, scientists, entrepreneurs, and amateurs, and is regarded as one of the most important in the world.

The Department of Photography was founded by Beaumont Newhall in 1940 and developed a world-renowned art photography collection under Edward Steichen (curator 1947–1961). Steichen's most notable and lasting exhibit, named The Family of Man, was seen by 9 million people. In 2003, the Family of Man photographic collection was added to UNESCO's Memory of the World Register in recognition of its historical value.

Steichen's hand-picked successor, John Szarkowski (curator 1962–1991), guided the department with several notable exhibitions, including 1967s New Documents that presented photographs by Diane Arbus, Lee Friedlander, and Garry Winogrand and is said to have "represented a shift in emphasis" and "identified a new direction in photography: pictures that seemed to have a casual, snapshot-like look and subject matter so apparently ordinary that it was hard to categorize". Under Szarkowski, it focused on a more traditionally modernist approach to the medium, one that emphasized documentary images and orthodox darkroom techniques.

Peter Galassi (curator 1991–2011) worked under his predecessor, whereas Quentin Bajac (curator 2013–2018) was hired from the outside. The current David Dechman Senior Curator of Photography is Roxana Marcoci, PhD.

=== Film ===
In 1932, museum founding director Alfred Barr stressed the importance of introducing "the only great art form peculiar to the 20th century" to "the American public which should appreciate good films and support them". Museum Trustee and film producer John Hay Whitney became the first chairman of the museum's Film Library from 1935 to 1951. The collection Whitney assembled with the help of film curator Iris Barry was so successful that in 1937 the Academy of Motion Pictures Arts and Sciences commended the museum with an award "for its significant work in collecting films ... and for the first time making available to the public the means of studying the historical and aesthetic development of the motion picture as one of the major arts".

The first curator and founder of the film library was Iris Barry, a British film critic and author whose three decades of work in collecting films and presenting them in artistic and historical contexts gained recognition for the cinema. Barry and her successors, including Margareta Akermark, built a collection comprising some 8000 titles.

Exiled film scholar Siegfried Kracauer worked at the MoMA film archive on a psychological history of German film between 1941 and 1943. The result of his study, From Caligari to Hitler: A Psychological History of the German Film (1947), traces the birth of Nazism from the cinema of the Weimar Republic and helped lay the foundation of modern film criticism.

Under the Museum of Modern Art Department of Film, the film collection includes more than 25,000 titles and ranks as one of the world's finest museum archives of international film art. The department owns prints of many familiar feature-length movies, including Citizen Kane and Vertigo, but its holdings also contains many less-traditional pieces, including Andy Warhol's eight-hour Empire, Fred Halsted's gay pornographic L.A. Plays Itself (screened before a capacity audience on April 23, 1974), various TV commercials, and Chris Cunningham's music video for Björk's All Is Full of Love.

=== Library ===
The MoMA library is located in Midtown Manhattan, with offsite storage in Long Island City, Queens. The noncirculating collection documents modern and contemporary art, including painting, sculpture, prints, photography, film, performance, and architecture from 1880–present. The collection includes 300,000 books, 1,000 periodicals, and 40,000 files about artists and artistic groups. Over 11,000 artist books are in the collection. The libraries are open by appointment to all researchers. The library's catalog is called "Dadabase". Dadabase includes records for all of the material in the library, including books, artist books, exhibition catalogs, special collections materials, and electronic resources. The MoMA's collection of artist books includes works by Ed Ruscha, Marcel Broodthaers, Susan Bee, Carl Andre, and David Horvitz.

Additionally, the library has subscription electronic resources along with Dadabase. These include journal databases (such as JSTOR and Art Full Text), auction results indexes (ArtFact and Artnet), the ARTstor image database, and WorldCat union catalog.

=== Architecture and design ===
Graphic showing MoMA's holdings by identity groups such as gender, geography, and nationality (2023)

MoMA's Department of Architecture and Design was founded in 1932 as the first museum department in the world dedicated to the intersection of architecture and design. The department's first director was Philip Johnson who served as curator between 1932 and 1934 and between 1946 and 1954. The next departmental head was Arthur Drexler, who was curator from 1951 to 1956 and then served as head until 1986.

The collection consists of 28,000 works including architectural models, drawings, and photographs. One of the highlights of the collection is the Mies van der Rohe Archive. It also includes works from such legendary architects and designers as Frank Lloyd Wright, Paul László, the Eameses, Betty Cooke, Isamu Noguchi, and George Nelson. The design collection contains many industrial and manufactured pieces, ranging from a self-aligning ball bearing to an entire Bell 47D1 helicopter. In 2012, the department acquired a selection of 14 video games, the basis of an intended collection of 40 that is to range from Pac-Man (1980) to Minecraft (2011). In 2026, MoMA and the Ambasz Institute began granting the Ambasz-MoMA Annual Prize for architecture.

== Management ==
=== Attendance ===
MoMA attracted 706,060 visitors in 2020, a drop of sixty-five percent from 2019, due to the COVID-19 pandemic. It ranked twenty-fifth on the list of most visited art museums in the world in 2020.

MoMA has seen its average number of visitors rise from about 1.5-million a year to 2.5-million after its new granite and glass renovation. In 2009, the museum reported 119,000 members and 2.8-million visitors over the previous fiscal year. MoMA attracted its then highest-ever number of visitors, 3.09 million, during its 2010 fiscal year; however, attendance dropped 11 percent to 2.8 million in 2011. Attendance in 2016 was 2.8 million, down from 3.1 million in 2015.

The museum was open every day since its founding in 1929, until 1975, when it closed one day a week (originally Wednesdays) to reduce operating expenses. In 2012, it again opened every day, including Tuesday, the one day it has traditionally been closed.

=== Admission ===
The Museum of Modern Art charges an admission fee of $30 per adult. Upon MoMA's reopening in 2004, its admission cost increased from $12 to $20, making it one of the most expensive museums in the city. However, it has free entry for New York State residents every Friday from 5:30pm to 8:30pm, as part of the Uniqlo Friday Nights program. Many New York area college students also receive free admission to the museum.

=== Finances ===
A private non-profit organization, MoMA is the seventh-largest U.S. museum by budget; its annual revenue is about $145 million. In 2011, the museum reported net assets (which does not include the value of the art) of just over $1 billion.

Unlike most museums, the museum eschews government funding, instead subsisting on a fragmented budget with a half-dozen different sources of income, none larger than a fifth. Before the 2008 financial crisis, the MoMA's board of trustees sold its equities and had an all-cash position. An $858 million capital campaign funded the 2002–04 expansion, with David Rockefeller donating $77 million in cash. In 2005, Rockefeller pledged an additional $100 million toward the museum's endowment. In 2012, Standard & Poor's, a nationally recognized statistical rating organization, raised its long-term rating for the museum as it benefited from the fundraising of its trustees. After construction expenses for the new galleries are covered, the Modern estimates that some $65 million will go to its $650 million endowment.

MoMA spent $32 million to acquire art for the fiscal year ending in June 2012.

MoMA employed about 815 people in 2007. The museum's tax filings from the past few years suggest a shift among the highest paid employees from curatorial staff to management. The museum's director Glenn D. Lowry earned $1.6 million in 2009 and lived in a rent-free $6 million apartment above the museum.

MoMA was forced to close in March 2020 during the COVID-19 pandemic in New York City. Citing the coronavirus shutdown, MoMA fired its art educators in April 2020. In May 2020, it was reported that MoMA would reduce its annual budget from $180 to $135 million starting July 1. Exhibition and publication funding was cut by half, and staff reduced from around 960 to 800.

Strike MoMA is a 2021 movement to strike the museum targeting what its supporters have called the "toxic philanthropy" of the museum's leadership.

== Art repatriation ==
The MoMA has been involved in several claims initiated by families for artworks lost in the Holocaust which ended up in the collection of the Museum of Modern Art.

In 2009, the heirs of German artist George Grosz filed a lawsuit seeking restitution of three works by Grosz, and the heirs of Paul von Mendelssohn-Bartholdy filed a lawsuit demanding the return of the painting by Pablo Picasso, entitled Boy Leading a Horse (1905–1906).

Another controversy involved Pablo Picasso's painting Boy Leading a Horse (1905–06), donated to MoMA by William S. Paley in 1964. The status of the work as being sold under duress by its German Jewish owners in the 1930s was in dispute. The descendants of the original owners sued MoMA and the Solomon R. Guggenheim Museum, which has another Picasso painting, Le Moulin de la Galette (1900), once owned by the same family, for return of the works. In 2009, both museums reached a confidential settlement with the descendants before the case went to trial and retained their respective paintings. Both museums had claimed from the outset to be the proper owners of these paintings, and that the claims were illegitimate. In a joint statement, the two museums wrote: "we settled simply to avoid the costs of prolonged litigation, and to ensure the public continues to have access to these important paintings."

In another case, after a decade-long court fight, in 2015 the MoMA returned a painting entitled Sand Hills by German artist Ernst Ludwig Kirchner to the Fischer family which had been left behind by Max Fischer when he fled Germany for the US in 1935.

In February 2024, the New York Times reported that MoMa had secretly restituted Marc Chagall's Over Vitebsk to the heirs of Franz Matthiesen in 2021 and that the restitution involved a $4 million payment to the museum. The painting had passed through the Nazi dealer Kurt Feldhausser and the Wehye Gallery and its provenance was disputed. The museum initially stated that the acquisition was not problematic, because its provenance researcher believed that the Matthiesen transfer was a repayment for debt, and not related to Nazi persecution of the Jews. However, the museum later reversed its position.

== Key people ==
=== Officers and the board of trustees ===
Currently, the board of trustees includes 56 trustees and 1 life trustee. The Founders Wall was created in 2004, when MoMA's expansion was completed, and features the names of the actual founders in addition to those who gave significant gifts; about a half-dozen names have been added since 2004. For example, Ileana Sonnabend's name was added in 2012, even though she was only 15 when the museum was established in 1929.

- Chair – Marie-Josée Kravis
- President – Sarah Arison

Vice Chairs:

- Sid R. Bass
- Mimi Haas
- Marlene Hess
- Maja Oeri
- Director – Christophe Cherix
- Treasurer – Edgar Wachenheim III
- Assistant treasurer – Jan Postma
- Secretary – James E. Grooms
- Honorary Chairman – Ronald S. Lauder
- Chairman Emeritus – Jerry I. Speyer
- President Emerita – Ronnie F. Heyman

==== Board of trustees ====
- Sarah Arison
- Alexandre Arnault
- Sid R. Bass
- Scott Belsky
- Lawrence B. Benenson
- Leon D. Black
- David Booth
- Clarissa Alcock Bronfman
- Patricia Phelps de Cisneros
- Steven Cohen
- Edith Cooper
- Paula Crown
- David Dechman
- Anne Dias-Griffin
- Glenn Dubin
- Lonti Ebers
- Joel S. Ehrenkranz
- John Elkann
- Laurence D. Fink
- Glenn Fuhrman
- Kathleen Fuld
- David Grain
- Mimi Haas
- Marlene Hess
- Ronnie F. Heyman
- AC Hudgins
- Pamela Joyner
- Jill Kraus
- Marie-Josée Kravis
- Ronald S. Lauder
- Micky Malka
- Khalil Gibran Muhammad
- Philip S. Niarchos
- James G. Niven
- Peter Norton
- Daniel S. Och
- Maja Oeri
- Eyal Ofer
- Michael S. Ovitz
- Emily Rauh Pulitzer
- Sharon Percy Rockefeller
- Richard Roth
- Richard E. Salomon
- Anna Marie Shapiro
- Anna Deavere Smith
- Robert Soros
- Jerry I. Speyer
- Jon Stryker
- Daniel Sundheim
- Tony Tamer
- Steven Tananbaum
- Alice M. Tisch
- Edgar Wachenheim III
- Helen Zell
- Xin Zhang
- Ryan Zurrer

Life trustees:

- David Rockefeller, Jr.

Honorary trustees:

- Elizabeth Diller
- S.K.H. Herzog Franz von Bayern
- Maurice R. Greenberg
- Glenn D. Lowry
- Wynton Marsalis
- Ted Sann

=== Directors ===
- Alfred H. Barr Jr. (1929–1943)
- No director (1943–1949; the job was handled by the chairman of the museum's coordination committee and the director of the Curatorial Department)
- Rene d'Harnoncourt (1949–1968)
- Bates Lowry (1968–1969)
- John Brantley Hightower (1970–1972)
- Richard Oldenburg (1972–1994)
- Glenn D. Lowry (1995–2025)
- Christophe Cherix (2025–)

=== Chief curators ===
- Philip Johnson, chief curator of architecture and design (1932–1934 and 1946–1954)
- Arthur Drexler, chief curator of architecture and design (1951–1956)
- Peter Galassi, chief curator of photography (1991–2011)
- Cornelia Butler, chief curator of drawings (2006–2013)
- Barry Bergdoll, chief curator of architecture and design (2007–2013)
- Rajendra Roy, chief curator of film (2007–present)
- Ann Temkin, chief curator of painting and sculpture (2008–present)
- Klaus Biesenbach, director of MoMA PS1 and chief curator at large (2009–2018)
- Sabine Breitwieser, chief curator of media and performance art (2010–2013)
- Christophe Cherix, chief curator of prints and illustrated books (2010–2013), drawings and prints (2013–2025)
- Paola Antonelli, director of research and development and senior curator of architecture and design (2012–present)
- Quentin Bajac, chief curator of photography (2012–2018)
- Stuart Comer, chief curator of media and performance art (2014–present)
- Martino Stierli, chief curator of architecture and design (2015–present)

== See also ==
- List of design museums
- List of largest art museums
- List of most-visited museums in the United States
- List of museums and cultural institutions in New York City
- Dorothy Canning Miller – American curator
- Sam Hunter – American art historian (1923–2014)
- Solomon R. Guggenheim Museum – Art museum in Manhattan, New York
- Pirouette: Turning Points in Design – 2025 exhibition at the Museum of Modern Art
- Talk to Me (exhibition) – 2011 exhibition at Museum of Modern Art
- The Family of Man – 1950s photography global exhibition
