= Christophe Cherix =

Swiss curator

Christophe Cherix (born Geneva, 1969) is a Swiss art curator. In March 2025, he was appointed director of the Museum of Modern Art (MoMA) in New York City. Cherix received a license ès lettres from the University of Geneva. He had worked as curator of prints at the Musée d’art et d’histoire de la Ville de Genève before assuming a position as curator in New York in 2007.
