= List of public art by Oldenburg and van Bruggen =

This is a list of public art by Claes Oldenburg and Coosje van Bruggen, also termed their "large scale projects". Oldenburg (1929-2022) and van Bruggen (1942–2009) were married Swedish-American and American-Dutch sculptors (respectively), best known for their Installation art typically featuring very large replicas of everyday objects. This list does not include all other types of artistic works by the artists (for example drawings and "happenings") and other sculptural works which are not public art (for example soft sculptures such as "Giant BLT").

With the exception of the earliest works, Lipstick, Three-Way Plug and Clothespin, all works listed are signed by both artists. Unless specified, dimensions are listed as height × width × depth.

Images may be missing from this list, due to no freedom of panorama provisions for copyrighted three-dimensional artworks in the copyright laws of countries where the affected artworks are located.

Image	Title	Description	Year	Location	Ref
	Lipstick (Ascending) on Caterpillar Tracks	Cor-Ten steel, steel, aluminum, cast resin; painted with polyurethane enamel 23 ft 6 in × 24 ft 11 in × 10 ft 11 in (7.16 m × 7.6 m × 3.32 m)	1969–74	Samuel F. B. Morse College at Yale University, New Haven, U.S. 41.31291500°N 72.93009800°W	
	Giant Three-Way Plug	Core-Ten steel and bronze 5 ft 1 in × 6 ft 6 in × 10 ft 0 in (155 cm × 198 cm × 306 cm)	1970	Allen Memorial Art Museum, Oberlin College, Ohio, U.S. 41.293164°N 82.216803°W	
	Giant Three-Way Plug (Cube Tap)	Core-Ten steel and bronze 9 ft 9.0 in × 6 ft 6.0 in × 4 ft 10.0 in (297.2 cm × 198.1 cm × 147.3 cm)	1970	d’Harnoncourt Sculpture Garden, Philadelphia Museum of Art, Pennsylvania, U.S. 39.966929°N 75.181950°W	
	Clothespin	Cor-Ten and stainless steel 45 ft. x 12 ft. 3 in. x 4 ft. 6 in. (13.7 x 3.7 x 1.4 m)	1976	Centre Square Plaza, Philadelphia, U.S. 39.9524°N 75.1656°W	
	Trowel I	Steel painted with polyurethane enamel 41 ft 9 in × 11 ft 3 in × 14 ft 7 in (12.73 m × 3.43 m × 4.44 m); Installed: 38 ft 5 in × 11 ft 3 in × 7 ft 5 in (11.71 m × 3.43 m × 2.26 m)	1971	Rijksmuseum Kröller-Müller, Otterlo, Netherlands	
	Trowel II	Cor-Ten steel painted with polyurethane enamel 41 ft 9 in × 11 ft 3 in × 14 ft 7 in (12.73 m × 3.43 m × 4.45 m); Installed: 37 ft 0 in × 11 ft 3 in × 7 ft 5 in (11.28 m × 3.43 m × 2.26 m)	1971–76	Donald M. Kendall Sculpture Gardens at PepsiCo, Purchase, U.S.	
	Batcolumn	Steel and aluminum painted with polyurethane enamel 96 feet 8 inches (29.46 m) high × 9 feet 9 inches (2.97 m) diameter, on base 4 feet (1.2 m) high × 10 feet (3.0 m)	1977	Harold Washington Social Security Center, Chicago, U.S.	
	Pool Balls	Reinforced concrete Three 11 ft. 6 in. (3.5 m) diameter	1977	Lake Aasee waterfront, Münster, Germany	
	Crusoe Umbrella	Cor-Ten steel painted with polyurethane enamel 37 × 37 × 58 ft. (11.3 × 11.3 × 17.7 m); Installed: 33 × 37 × 56 ft. (10.1 × 11.3 × 17.1 m)	1979	Cowles Commons, Civic Center of Greater Des Moines, Des Moines, Iowa, U.S.	
	Flashlight	Steel painted with polyurethane enamel 38 ft. 6 in. (11.7 m) high × 10 ft. 6 in. (3.2 m) diameter	1981	University of Nevada, Las Vegas, U.S.	
	Split Button	Aluminum painted with polyurethane enamel 16 ft. (4.9 m) diameter × 10 in. (0.3 m) thick height from ground when sited: 4 ft. 11 in. (1.5 m)	1981	Blanche Levy Park, University of Pennsylvania, Philadelphia, U.S.	
	Hat in Three Stages of Landing	Steel and aluminum painted with polyurethane enamel Three hats, each 9 ft. 5 in. × 18 ft. × 15 ft. 5 in. (2.9 × 5.5 × 4.7 m); Each hat is supported on two poles at a different height, equidistant, over an area approximately 162 ft. (49.4 m) long: 19 ft. 3 in. (5.9 m) high 12 ft. 10 in. (3.9 m) high 6 ft. 1 in. (1.9 m) high	1982	Sherwood Park, Salinas, U.S.	
	Spitzhacke (Pickaxe)	Steel painted with polyurethane enamel 36 ft. 9 in. × 44 ft. 6 in. × 3 ft. 8 in. (11.2 × 13.6 × 1.1 m); Installed: 43 ft. 5 in. × 42 ft. 7 in. × 11 ft. 5 in. (13.2 × 13 × 3.5 m)	1982	Kassel, Germany	
	Gartenschlauch (Garden Hose)	Steel painted with polyurethane enamel Two parts, in an area approximately 6,000 sq. ft. (557.4 sq. m); Faucet: 35 ft. 5 in. × 8 ft. 12 in. × 7 ft. 1 in. (10.8 × 2.7 × 2.2 m); Hose: 410 ft. (125 m) long × 20 in. (0.5 m) diameter	1983	Eschholzpark, Freiburg, Germany	
	Screwarch	Aluminum painted with polyurethane enamel 12 ft. 8 in. × 21 ft. 6 in. × 7 ft. 10 in. (3.9 × 6.6 × 2.4 m)	1983	Museum Boymans-van Beuningen, Rotterdam, Netherlands	
	Cross Section of a Toothbrush with Paste, in a Cup, on a Sink: Portrait of Coosje's Thinking	Steel and cast iron painted with polyurethane enamel 19 ft. 8 in. × 9 ft. 2 in. × 7 in. (6 × 2.8 × 0.2 m)	1983	Haus Esters, Krefeld, Germany	
	Stake Hitch	Stake: steel, aluminum, epoxy, painted with polyurethane enamel Rope: polyurethane foam, plastic materials, fiber-reinforced plastic; painted with latex Total height: 53 ft. 6 in. (16.3 m); Stake with knot, upper floor: 13 ft. 6 in. × 18 ft. 2 in. × 14 ft. 7 in. (4.1 × 5.5 × 4.5 m); Stake, lower floor: 12 ft. 10 in. × 5 ft. × 3 ft. (3.9 × 1.5 × 0.9 m); Rope, knot to ceiling: 40 ft. (12.2 m) high × 20 in. (0.5 m) diameter	1984	Dallas Museum of Art, Dallas, U.S.	
	Balancing Tools	Steel painted with polyurethane enamel 26 ft. 3 in. × 29 ft. 6 in. × 19 ft. 10 in. (8 × 9 × 6.1 m)	1984	Vitra International, Weil am Rhein, Germany	
	Knife Ship I	Steel, wood, plastic coated fabric, motor Closed, without oars: 7 ft. 8 in. × 10 ft. 6 in. × 40 ft. 5 in. (2.3 × 3.2 × 12.3 m); Extended, with oars: 26 ft. 4 in. × 31 ft. 6 in. × 82 ft. 11 in. (8 × 9.6 × 25.3 m); Height with large blade raised: 31 ft. 8 in. (9.7 m); Width with blades extended: 82 ft. 10 in. (25.2 m)	1985	Guggenheim Museum Bilbao, Spain	
	Knife Slicing Through Wall	Stainless steel, steel, stucco Blade: 6 ft × 8 in × 11 ft (1.83 × .20 × 3.51 m)	1989	817 Hillsdale Ave., Los Angeles, U.S. (formerly the Margo Leavin Gallery)	
	Toppling Ladder with Spilling Paint	Steel and aluminum painted with polyurethane enamel 14 ft. 2 in. × 10 ft. 8 in. × 7 ft. 7 in. (4.3 × 3.3 × 2.3 m)	1986	Loyola Law School, Los Angeles, U.S.	
	Spoonbridge and Cherry	Stainless steel and aluminum painted with polyurethane enamel 29 ft. 6 in. × 51 ft. 6 in. × 13 ft. 6 in. (9 × 15.7 × 4.1 m)	1988	Minneapolis Sculpture Garden, Walker Art Center, Minneapolis, U.S.	
	Dropped Bowl with Scattered Slices and Peels	Steel, reinforced concrete, fiber-reinforced plastic; painted with polyurethane enamel; stainless steel Seventeen parts (eight bowl fragments, four peels, five orange sections), in an area approximately 16 ft. 9 in. × 91 ft. × 105 ft. (5.1 × 27.7 × 32 m)	1990	Metro-Dade Open Space Park, Miami, U.S.	
	La Bicyclette Ensevelie (Buried Bicycle)	Steel, aluminum, fiber-reinforced plastic; painted with polyurethane enamel Four parts, in an area approximately 150 ft. 11 in. × 71 ft. 2 in. (46 × 21.7 m)	1990	Parc de la Villette, Paris, France	
	Monument to the Last Horse	Aluminum and polyurethane foam painted with polyurethane enamel 19 ft. 8 in. × 17 ft. × 12 ft. 4 in. (6 × 5.2 × 3.8 m)	1991	The Chinati Foundation, Marfa, U.S.	
	Binoculars	Steel frame. Exterior: concrete and cement plaster painted with elastomeric paint. Interior: gypsum plaster 45 × 44 × 18 ft. (13.7 × 13.4 × 5.5 m)	1991	340 Main Street, Venice, U.S.	
	Free Stamp	Steel and aluminum painted with polyurethane enamel 28 ft. 10 in. × 26 ft. × 49 ft. (8.8 × 7.9 × 14.9 m)	1991	Willard Park, Cleveland, U.S.	
	Mistos (Match Cover)	Steel, aluminum, fiber-reinforced plastic; painted with polyurethane enamel Overall: 68 ft. × 33 ft. × 43 ft. 4 in. (20.7 × 10.1 × 13.2 m)	1992	La Vall d'Hebron, Barcelona, Spain	
	Apple Core	Stainless steel, urethane foam, resin, urethane enamel 3m x 2m x 2m	1992	The Israel Museum, Jerusalem, Israel	
	Bottle of Notes	Steel painted with polyurethane enamel 30 × 16 × 10 ft. (9.1 × 4.9 × 3.1 m)	1993	Central Gardens, Middlesbrough, England	
	Inverted Collar and Tie	Steel, polymer concrete, fiber-reinforced plastic; painted with polyester gelcoat 39 ft. × 27 ft. 9 in. × 12 ft. 8 in. (11.9 × 8.5 × 3.9 m)	1994	Mainzer Landstrasse, Frankfurt am Main, Germany	
	Shuttlecocks	Aluminum and fiber-reinforced plastic painted with polyurethane enamel Four shuttlecocks, each 17 ft. 11 in. (5.5 m) high × 15 ft. 1 in. (4.6 m) crown diameter and 4 ft. (1.2 m) nose diameter	1994	Nelson-Atkins Museum of Art, Kansas City, U.S.	
	Soft Shuttlecock	Steel, aluminum, wood, fiber-reinforced plastic, expanded polystyrene and polyethylene foams, canvas, rope; painted with latex Nosecone, approximately 3 ft. high (0.9 m) × 6 ft. (1.8 m) diameter Nine feathers, each approximately 26 ft. (7.9 m) long × 6 ft. 6 in. (2 m) wide	1995	Guggenheim Museum, New York, U.S.	
	Houseball	Stainless steel, fiber-reinforced plastic, jute netting, urethane and polyvinylchloride foams; painted with polyester gelcoat 27 ft. 6 in. (8.4 m) high × 24 ft. 4 in. (7.4 m) diameter	1996	Bethlehemkirch-Platz, Berlin, Germany	
	Saw, Sawing	Steel, epoxy resin, fiber-reinforced plastic, urethane and polyvinylchloride foams; painted with polyester gelcoat 50 ft. 8 in. × 4 ft. 9 in. × 40 ft. (15.4 × 1.5 × 12.2 m)	1996	Tokyo International Exhibition Center, Tokyo, Japan	
	Torn Notebook	Stainless steel, steel, aluminum; painted with polyurethane enamel Three parts (notebook and two loose pages); Notebook: 21 ft. 10 in. × 23 ft. × 26 ft. 1 in. (6.7 × 6.4 × 8 m); Page (1): 10 ft. × 14 ft. 1 in. × 7 ft. 1 in. (3.0 × 4.3 × 2.2 m); Page (2): 11 ft. 8 in. × 8 ft. 7 in. × 8 ft. 2 in. (3.6 × 2.6 × 2.5 m)	1996	Madden Garden, University of Nebraska–Lincoln, U.S.	
	Typewriter Eraser, Scale X	Stainless steel and fiberglass 19 ft. 9 1/4 in. x 12 ft. 8 1/2 in. x 11 ft. 4 in. (6.026 x 3.874 x 3.454 m)	1999	National Gallery of Art Sculpture Garden, Washington D.C., U.S. Seattle Art Museum Olympic Sculpture Park; CityCenter, Paradise, Nevada	
	Lion's Tail	Stainless steel, aluminum, wood, fiber-reinforced plastic, expanded polystyrene, painted with urethane enamel; nylon 18 ft. 6 in. × 15 ft. × 4 ft. (5.6 × 4.6 × 1.2 m)	1999	Musei Civici Veneziani, Venice, Italy	
	Ago, Filo e Nodo (Needle, Thread and Knot)	Brushed stainless steel and fiber-reinforced plastic painted with polyester gelcoat and polyurethane enamel Needle and thread: 59 ft. (18 m) high × 50 3/8 in. (128 cm) diameter Knot: 19 ft. (5.8 m) long × 19 11/16 in. (50 cm) diameter	2000	Piazzale Cadorna, Milan, Italy; 45°28′5.24″N 9°10′35.87″E	
	Flying Pins	Steel, fiber-reinforced plastic, foam, epoxy; painted with polyester gelcoat and polyurethane enamel Ten pins, each: 24 ft. 7 in. (7.5 m) high × 7 ft. 7 in. (2.3 m) widest diameter in an area approximately 123 ft. (37.5 m) long × 65 ft. 7 in. (20 m) wide Ball: 9 ft. 2 in. (2.8 m) high × 21 ft. 12 in. (6.7 m) diameter	2000	Intersection of John F. Kennedylaan and Fellenoord Avenues, Eindhoven, Netherlands	
	Dropped Cone	Stainless and galvanized steels, fiber-reinforced plastic, balsawood; painted with polyester gelcoat 39 ft. 10 in. (12.1 m) high × 19 ft. (5.8 m) diameter	2001	Neumarkt Galerie, Cologne, Germany	
	Cupid's Span	Stainless steel, structural carbon steel, fiber-reinforced plastic, cast epoxy, polyvinylchloride foam; painted with polyester gelcoat 60 ft. (18.3 m) high	2002	Rincon Park, San Francisco, U.S.	
	Big Sweep	Stainless steel, aluminum, fiber-reinforced plastic; painted with polyurethane enamel 31 ft. 4 in. × 25 ft. 4 in. × 15 ft. 1 in. (9.6 × 7.7 × 4.6 m)	2006	Denver Art Museum, Denver, U.S.	
	Spring	Steel, cast aluminum, aluminum; painted with acrylic polyurethane 70 ft. (21.3 m) high × 18 ft. (5.5 m) diameter at base of sculpture	2006	Cheonggyecheon, Seoul, South Korea	
	Tumbling Tacks	Steel, fiberglass, resin, polyurethane foam, gelcoat and transparent stained glass coating Four tacks, each 18 ft. (5.5 m) in diameter	2009	Kistefos Museum, Kistefos, Norway	
	Paint Torch	Steel, fiberglass reinforced plastic, gelcoat, polyurethane, LED lighting Height from ground: 50 ft. 11 in.; Total length of work: 53 ft. 9/16 in.	2011	Pennsylvania Academy of the Fine Arts, Philadelphia, U.S.	
