= Iroquois (di Suvero) =

Coordinates: 39.965°N 75.1778°W

- Artist: Mark di Suvero
- Year: 1983
- Type: Steel
- Dimensions: 13 m × 12 m × 0.91 m (42 ft × 40 ft × 3 ft)
- Location: Philadelphia, United States
- Owner: Association for Public Art (formerly the Fairmount Park Art Association), donated by David N. Pincus

Iroquois is a sculpture by American artist Mark di Suvero, owned by the Association for Public Art. The artwork is located at the Benjamin Franklin Parkway, at Eakins Oval and 24th Street, Philadelphia, United States. Iroquois is one of the many sculptures included in the Association's for Public Art's Museum Without Walls: AUDIO™ interpretive audio program for Philadelphia's outdoor sculpture.

== Acquisition and installation ==
The Association for Public Art (formerly the Fairmount Park Art Association) acquired and installed Iroquois in 2007 after it was donated by art patron and humanitarian David N. Pincus. The executive director of the Association for Public Art, Penny Balkin Bach, described the gift as "the most generous contribution made by a private donor to public sculpture in Philadelphia," and "the most important contemporary sculpture to come to Philadelphia since Claes Oldenburg's Clothespin in 1976." Before Iroquois came to Philadelphia, the sculpture had been on loan to the Frederik Meijer Gardens & Sculpture Park in Grand Rapids, Michigan. The sculpture stands alongside Symbiosis, a stainless steel "dendroid" sculpture by artist Roxy Paine that was installed by the Association for Public Art in 2014.

== See also ==
- List of public art in Philadelphia
