= Mistos =

Sculpture by Claes Oldenburg and Coosje van Bruggen in Barcelona, Spain

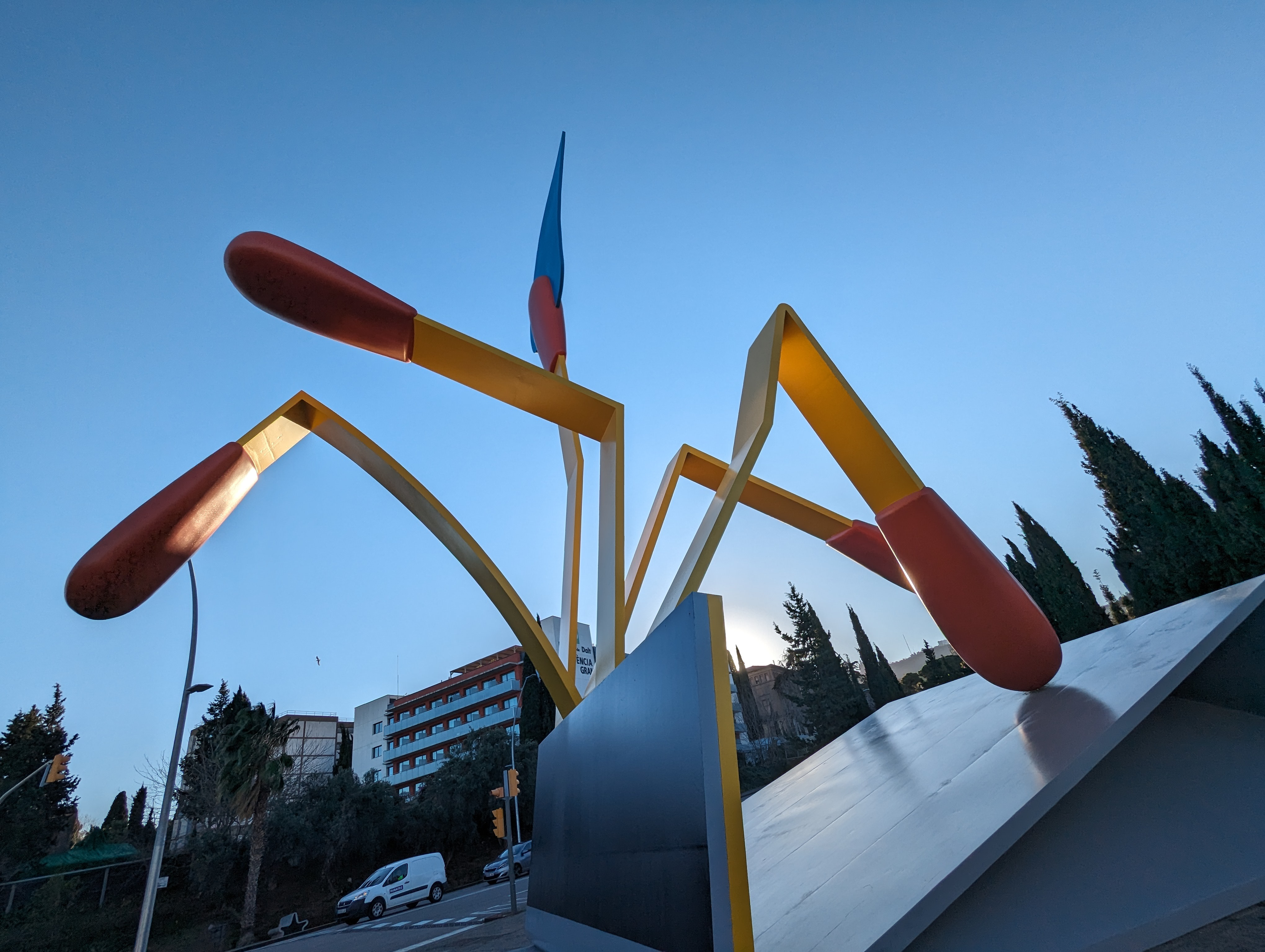
- The centerpiece of the installation in 2024.
- Artist: Claes Oldenburg; Coosje van Bruggen
- Year: 1992
- Type: Sculpture
- Dimensions: 20 m × 9 m × 13 m (790 in × 350 in × 510 in)
- Location: Barcelona, Catalonia, Spain

Mistos (Match Cover or Matches) is the name given to a group of sculptures by artists Claes Oldenburg and Coosje van Bruggen located in the La Vall d’Hebron neighborhood of Barcelona, Catalonia in Spain. The statue was unveiled in 1992 in anticipation for the 1992 Olympic Games in Barcelona and depicts several matches bending out of a matchbook, with several of the “burned” matches strewn about the nearby intersection. Like most of Oldenburg and van Bruggens’ works, the statues are made of painted steel and concrete.

== Background ==
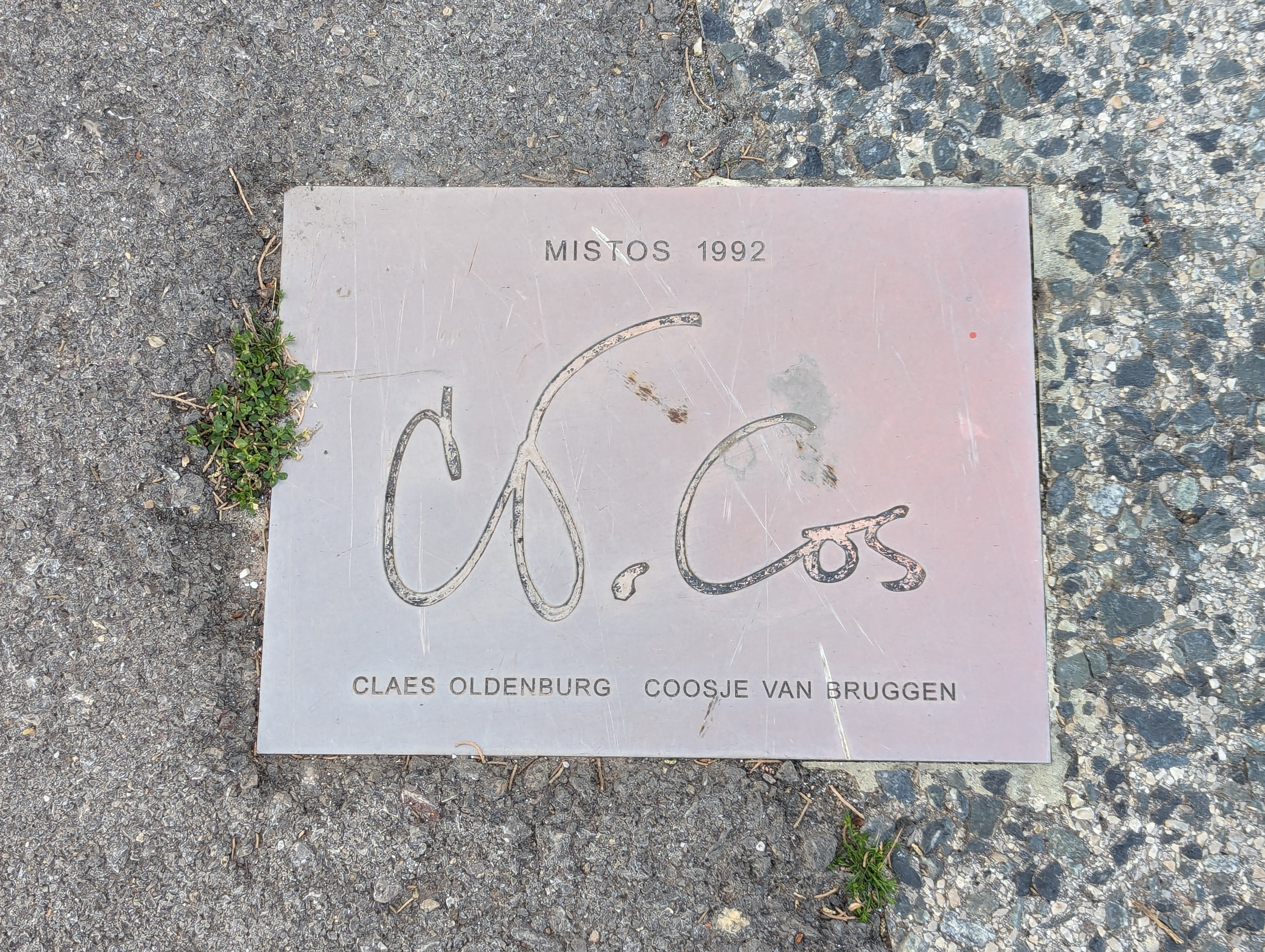
Oldenburg and van Bruggen's signature at the base of the statue

By the late 1980s, Swedish-American artist Claes Oldenburg and his wife, Coosje van Bruggen, had made a name for themselves creating large replicas of household objects for public art installations across the globe. Pieces like Lipstick (Ascending) on Caterpillar Tracks (1974) and Spoonbridge and Cherry (1988) helped them gain notoriety, and they were commissioned by Barcelona's Olympic Council to create a piece for the city, as the Summer Olympic Games were to be held there in 1992. Oldenburg and van Bruggen were invited to Barcelona in 1986 by the council, and the piece was subsequently commissioned.

In contrast to many of the other contracted artists who created work to be placed beside the coast, Oldenburg and van Bruggen remarked that they were “more interested in the residential areas being developed for the Olympic Games that would afterward become new neighborhoods”. Accordingly, the piece was designed to be placed in the newly developed La Vall d’Hebron neighborhood, wherein the many competitions were held for the games. The piece is located in front of the tennis area.

== Description ==
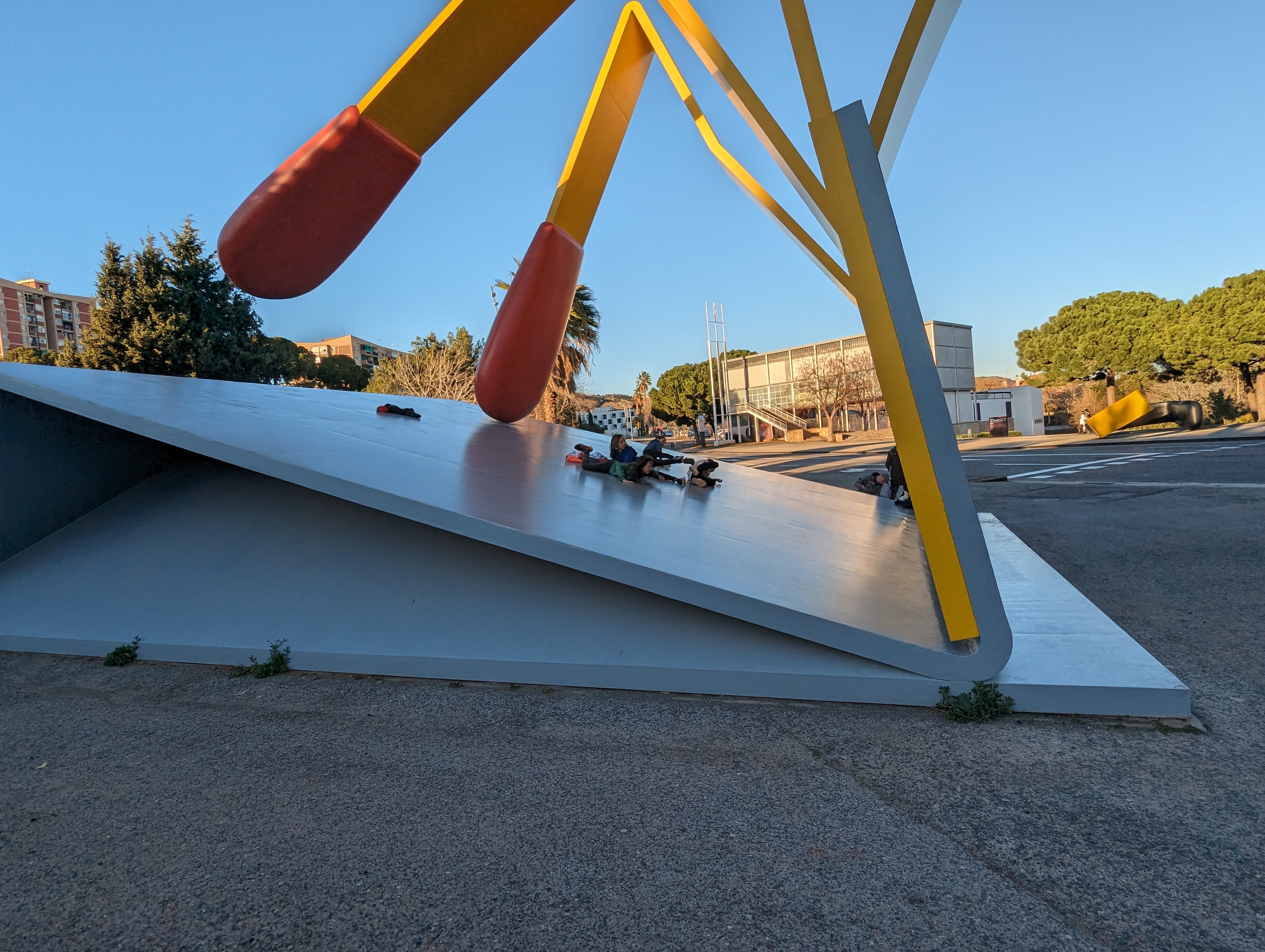
Children sliding on the statue.

Mistos is a series of 6 statues of oversized matches. The centerpiece, located at the intersection of Avinguda Cardenal Vidal i Barraquer and Carrer Pare Mariana, in front of the Pavilion of the Spanish Republic, shows five matches being bent out of a matchbox. The tallest match is set ablaze with an angular blue flame. There are five other statues surrounding the centerpiece, each showing a match in a different state. To the direct west of the centerpiece is a crumpled, burned match, whereas the match to the direct north of the centerpiece is not stricken and bent in a Z-shape design. Two statues stand across Avinguda Cardenal Vidal i Barraquer, directly east of the centerpiece, showing another burnt match and another that has not been struck. The match statue directly south of the centerpiece, across Carrer Pare Mariana, is bent in a W-shape design.

All of the matches are made of steel and generally stand around 7 feet tall. The sticks are painted bright yellow, whereas the match heads are red. Two of the matches rendered “burnt” are colored black instead of red. The matchbox proper is painted grey and black. Atop the tallest match in the centerpiece is a blue flame. Like many of the duo's sculptures, Mistos uses flat, bold colors.

The matchbox base of the centerpiece is aligned with the sidewalk in such a way that it can easily be climbed. Many local children slide down this triangularly-shaped section.

== Gallery ==
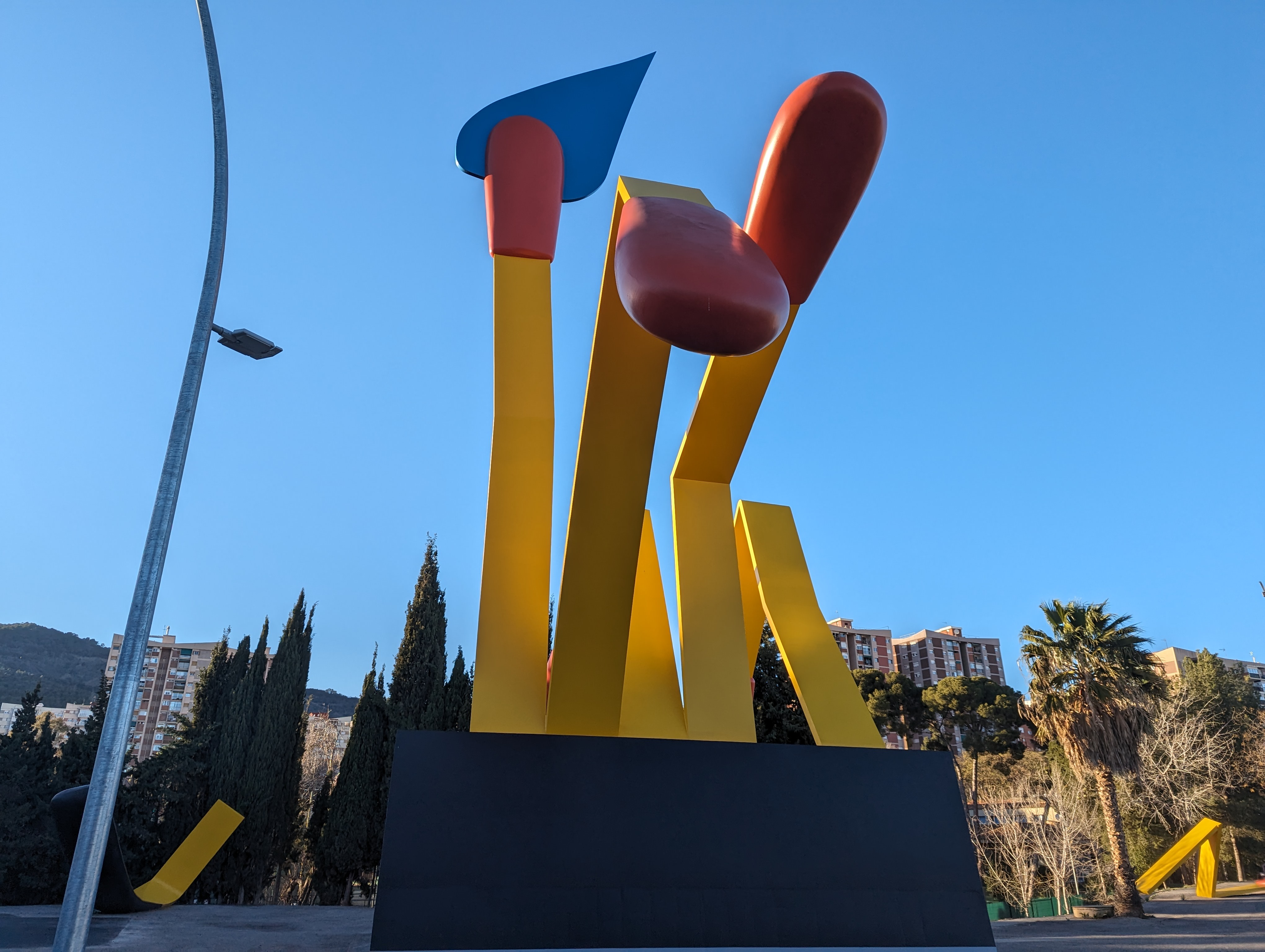
The centerpiece, looking south

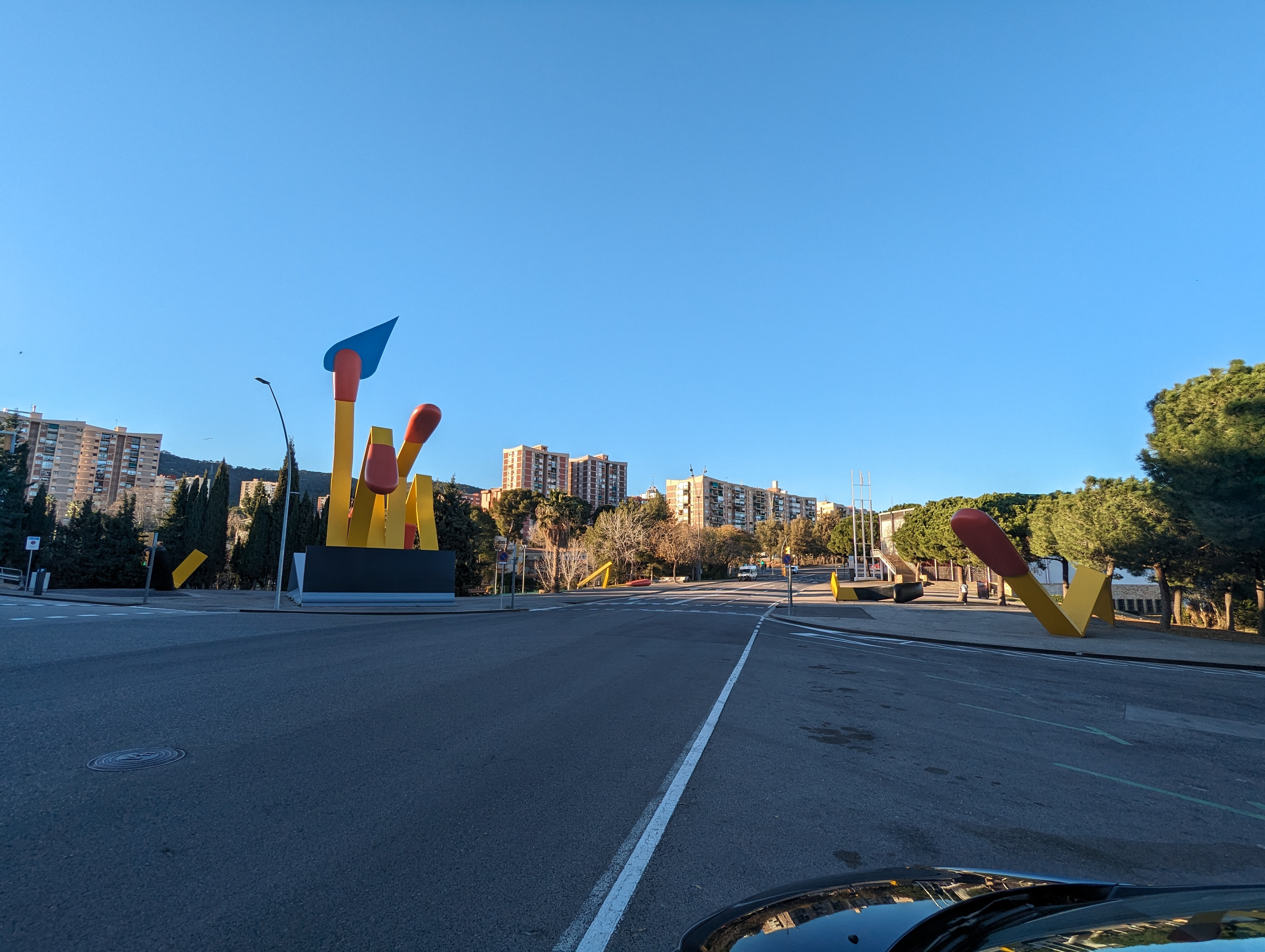
Five of the six pieces that comprise Mistos, seen from the opposite intersection

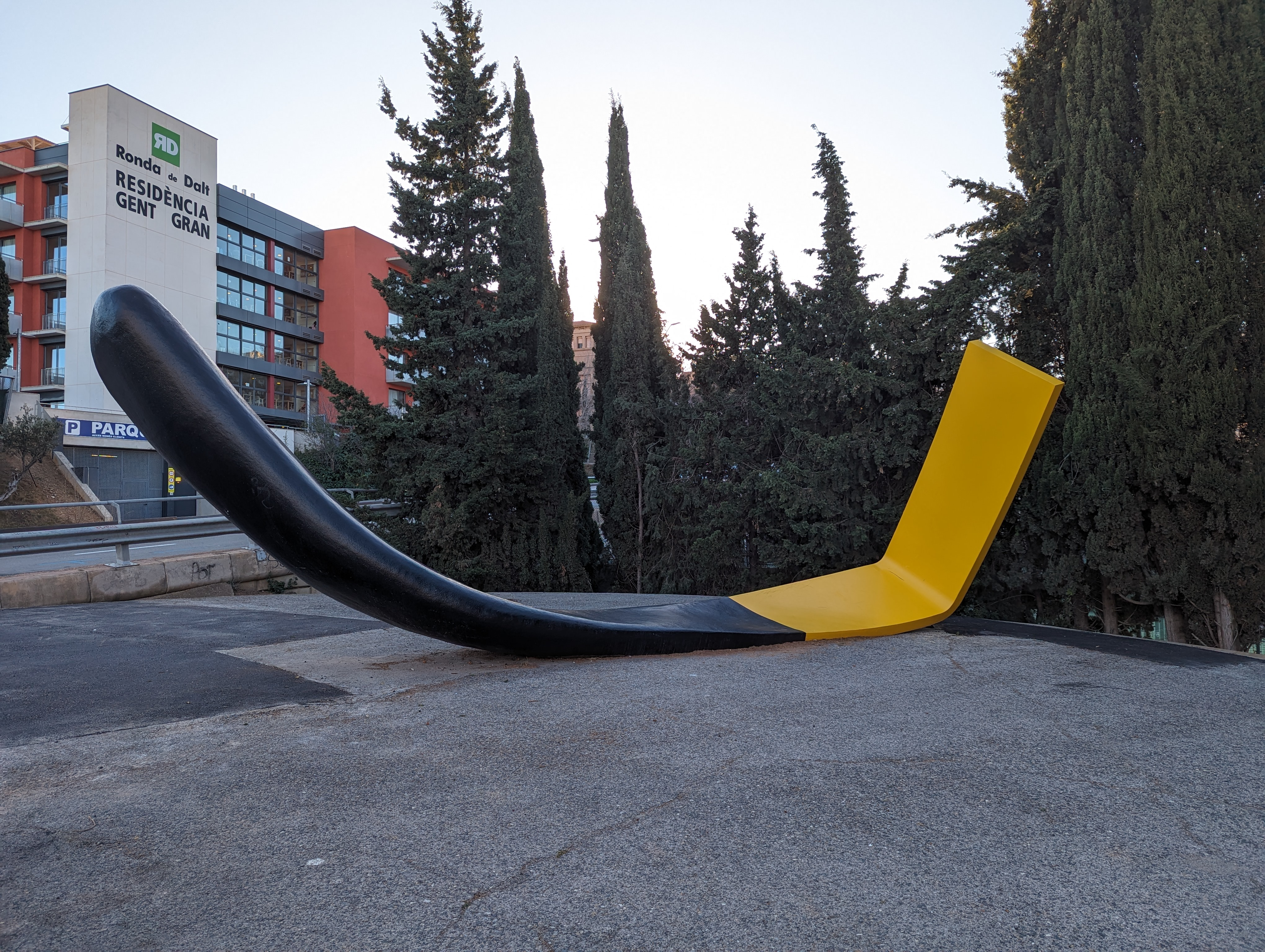
The “burned” match to the west of the centerpiece

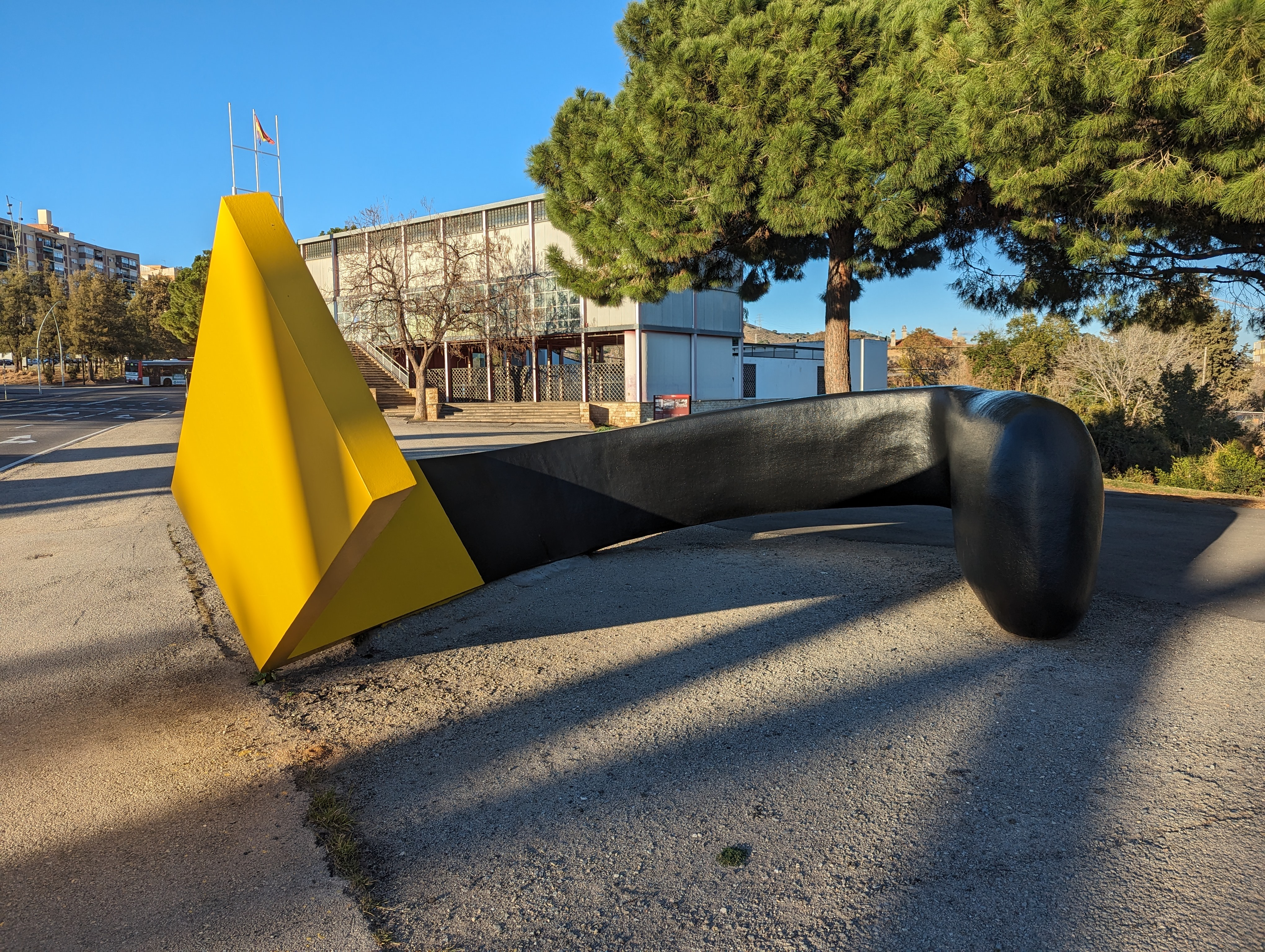
The “burned” match to the east of the centerpiece

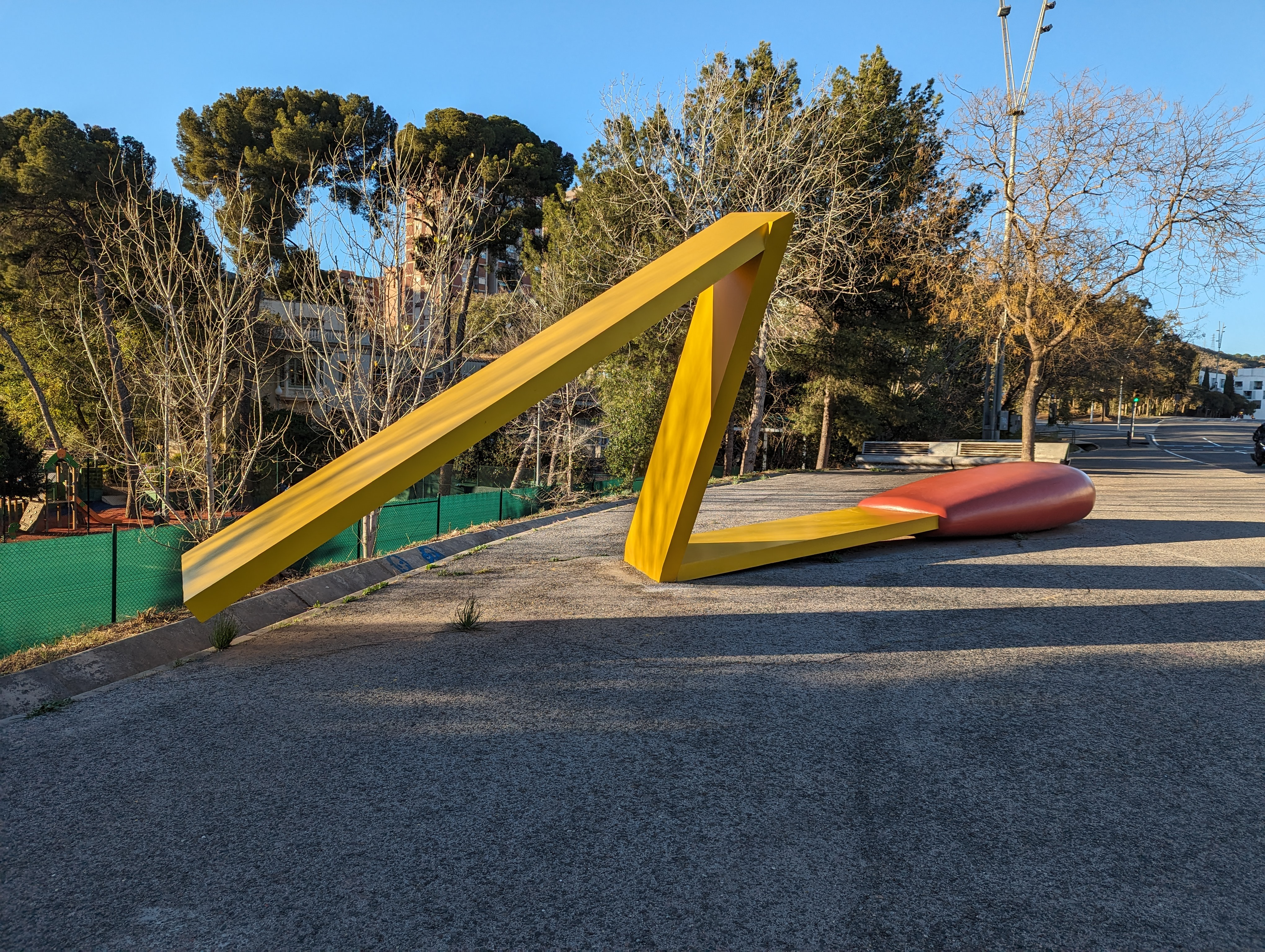
The bent match north of the centerpiece

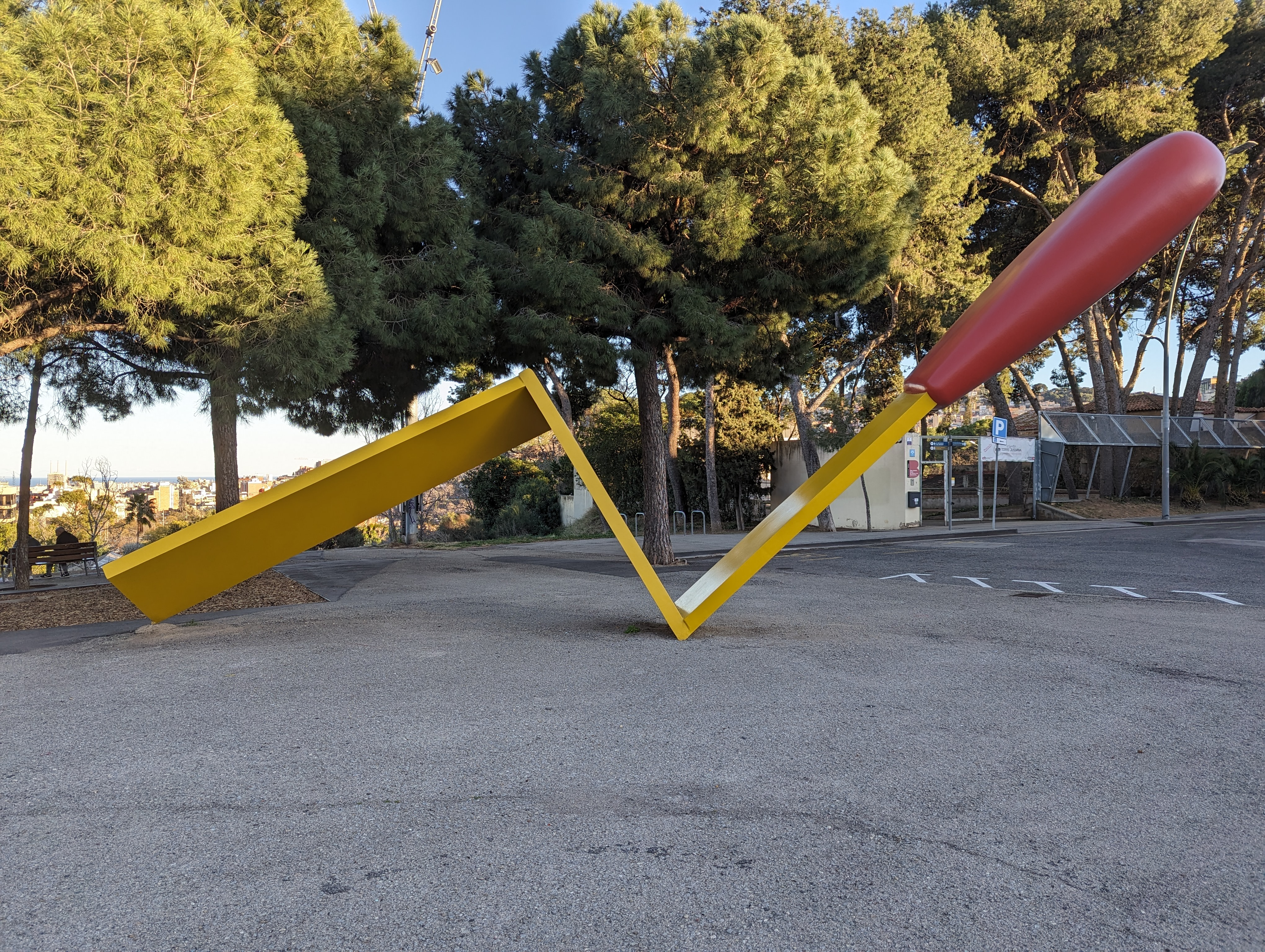
The bent match east of the centerpiece
