= Typewriter Eraser, Scale X =

Sculpture by Claes Oldenburg and Coosje van Bruggen

- Artist: Claes Oldenburg; Coosje van Bruggen
- Year: 1999
- Type: sculpture
- Dimensions: 350 cm (227 1/4 in × 152 1/2 in × 136 in)
- Location: National Gallery of Art Sculpture Garden; Washington, D.C.; 38°53′30.2″N 77°1′25″W
- Owner: National Gallery of Art

Typewriter Eraser, Scale X is a sculpture of a large-scale typewriter eraser by Claes Oldenburg and Coosje van Bruggen.

Constructed in 1999, this model is located at the National Gallery of Art Sculpture Garden. Other models are also located at Seattle Center near the Museum of Pop Culture, and CityCenter, Paradise. Typewriter Eraser, Scale X is on view at the Norton Museum of Art.

External image
- Typewriter Eraser, Scale X, foreground, decorates Seattle

== See also ==
- List of public art in Washington, D.C., Ward 2
- List of works by Oldenburg and van Bruggen
