= Big Sweep =

Sculpture by Claes Oldenburg and Coosje van Bruggen

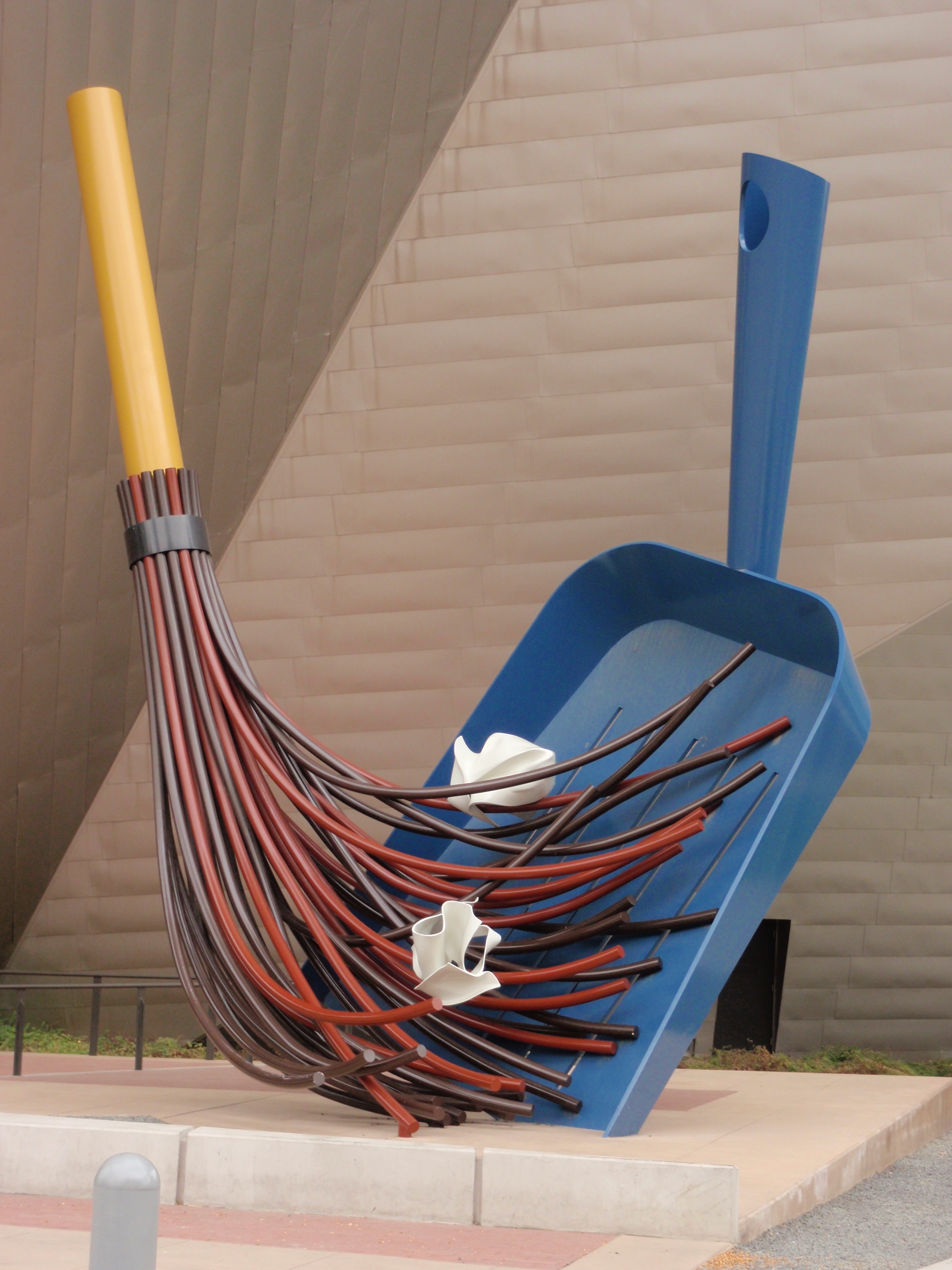
- The sculpture in 2012
- Location: Denver Art Museum, Denver, Colorado, U.S.
- 39°44′12.1″N 104°59′20.6″W

Big Sweep is a sculpture by Claes Oldenburg and Coosje van Bruggen, installed in Denver, Colorado, United States. It depicts a broom and dustpan, and has been outside the Denver Art Museum since 2006.

== Description ==
According to Lonely Planet, the sculpture's color was selected "to complement Denver's clear blue skies" and the scale was "inspired by the vastness of Colorado's mountains and plains".

== History ==
A conservation project on the artwork was completed in August 2013. In 2019, the Denver Art Museum exhibited works by the artists, including eight sketches of Big Sweep.

== Reception ==
In 2012, CBS Colorado said Big Sweep was "perhaps the most fun" of the "impressive" sculptures outside the museum. Julianna O'Clair included Big Sweep in Westword's 2023 list of Denver's ten most famous public artworks. O'Clair said the sculpture "perfectly represents the artist’s goal of turning the mundane into the extraordinary".

== See also ==
- List of public art by Oldenburg and van Bruggen
