= Orange, Red, Yellow =

Painting by Mark Rothko

- Artist: Mark Rothko
- Year: 1961
- Medium: Acrylic on canvas
- Dimensions: 236.2 cm × 206.4 cm (93 in × 81 1/4 in)
- Location: Private collection

Orange, Red, Yellow is a 1961 Color Field painting by Mark Rothko. On May 8, 2012, it was sold at Christie's from the estate of David Pincus for $86,882,500, a record nominal price for post-war contemporary art at public auction.

== History ==
The work was acquired by Marlborough Fine Art in London from the Marlborough-Gerson gallery in New York. Marlborough Fine Art sold the work to David Pincus in 1967. Pincus is regarded as one of the leading American collectors in the second half of the 20th century. The work has not been on the market in the 45 years since Pincus' acquisition.

Orange, Red, Yellow has been exhibited on occasion. From February to March 1964, it was exhibited at the Marlborough New London Gallery in London in a Mark Rothko exhibition. From September to November 1986 it was exhibited by the Philadelphia Museum of Art, in its "Philadelphia Collects: Art Since 1940" exhibition. From June to December 1996 it was exhibited by the Palmer Museum of Art at Pennsylvania State University in University Park, Pennsylvania for their "Abstraction to Figuration: Selections of Contemporary Art from the Pincus Collection" exhibition. It was also later on extended loan at the Philadelphia Museum of Art.

== 2012 auction ==
The work surpassed the 2007 record price for a Rothko work of $72.8 million set when David Rockefeller sold White Center (Yellow, Pink and Lavender on Rose). The hammer price was $77.5 million, and the price was $86.8 million including buyer's premium. It established a new record for post-war/contemporary art at a public auction, when ignoring inflation. The highest price paid for a post-war painting in a private sale is believed to be $140 million (~$160 million in May 2012 dollars) for Jackson Pollock's No. 5, 1948 in November 2006. In constant dollars, the record price for post-war art at a public auction remained with Triptych, 1976 by Francis Bacon, sold at Sotheby's for $86.3 million in May 2008 (~$92 million in May 2012 dollars).

The price for Rothko's painting was expected to top out near $45 million based on presale estimates. When the record-setting 2012 auction price reached $70 million, three bidders remained competitive. The bidding extended for over six and a half minutes, which is "...one of the longest bidding matches yet witnessed in a contemporary art sale."

== Critical commentary ==
Souren Melikian of The New York Times described Rothko's Orange, Red, Yellow as one that "...can convincingly be argued to be the most powerful of all his pictures", Kelly Crow of The Wall Street Journal stated that "The painting's trio of orange and yellow rectangles bobbing atop a cherry-red background forms a palette that's as eye-catching as a sunset or a Popsicle," noting that "Auction specialists say collectors historically pay more for works that are red and gold, as opposed to gray."

== See also ==
- List of most expensive paintings
