= Cupid's Span =

Sculpture by Claes Oldenburg and Coosje van Bruggen in San Francisco, California, U.S.

- Artist: Claes Oldenburg; Coosje van Bruggen
- Year: 2002
- Type: Sculpture
- Location: San Francisco, California, United States; 37°47′30″N 122°23′24″W

Cupid's Span is an outdoor sculpture by married artists Claes Oldenburg and Coosje van Bruggen, installed along the Embarcadero in San Francisco, California, in the United States. The 70-foot (21 m) sculpture, commissioned by Gap Inc. founders Donald and Doris F. Fisher, depicts a partial bow and piece of an arrow.

== Description and history ==
Claes Oldenburg and Coosje van Bruggen's Cupid's Span, made of fiberglass and steel, was installed in the newly built Rincon Park along the Embarcadero in San Francisco in 2002. The piece resembles Cupid's bow and arrow, drawn, with the arrow and bow partially implanted in the ground; the artists stated that the piece expressed their conception of San Francisco as "the home port of Eros," hence the stereotypical bow and arrow of Cupid. Leydier and Penwarden wrote, "Love's trade-mark weapon naturally evokes the city's permissive and romantic reputation, while formally its taut curve resonates wonderfully with the structure of the famous suspension bridge (the San Francisco–Oakland Bay Bridge) in the background."

== See also ==
- 2002 in art
- List of public art by Oldenburg and van Bruggen
