= Inverted Collar and Tie =

Sculpture by Claes Oldenburg and Coosje van Bruggen

Coordinates: 50°06′38″N 8°39′45″E

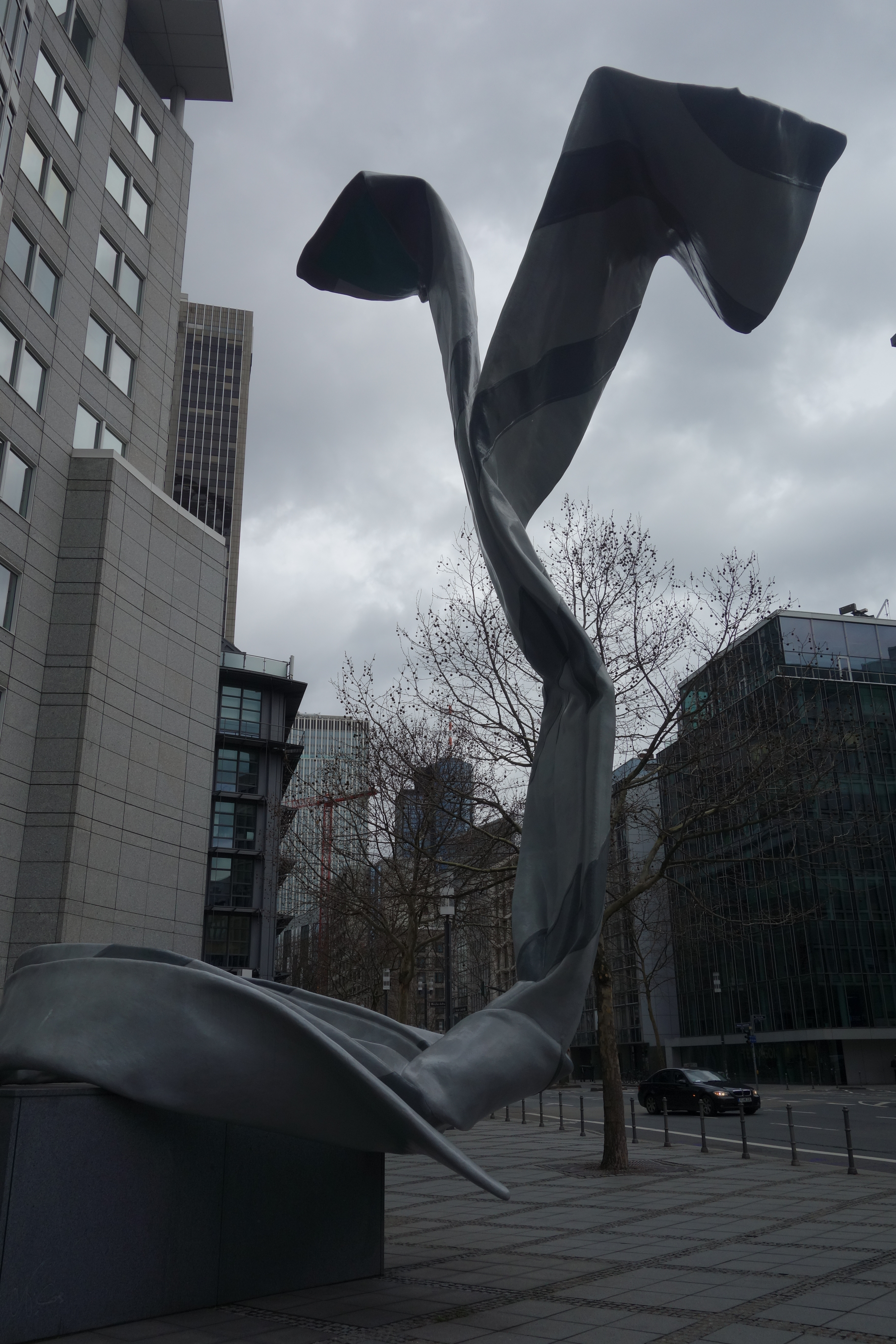
Inverted Collar and Tie (1994)

Inverted Collar and Tie is a sculpture designed in 1994 by Claes Oldenburg and Coosje van Bruggen. It is located in Frankfurt's Westend in front of the Westend Tower. The DG Bank ordered the artwork in 1993. It was made in California.

Inverted Collar and Tie shows a huge collar of a shirt and a necktie that are mounted top down on a pedestal. The necktie spreads its ends upwards as if it is fluttering lightly in the wind. The pedestal is painted in dark grey, the necktie is coloured in light grey with dark stripes. The artwork's dimensions are 11.9 m × 8.5 m × 3.9 m (39 ft × 28 ft × 13 ft), and it weighs 7.5 metric tons. The sculpture is made from polymer concrete, steel and glass-reinforced plastic.

The artwork is an ironic allusion to the business people wearing "collar and tie" who work in the DZ's office tower and in the Frankfurt banking district around.

== See also ==
- List of works by Oldenburg and van Bruggen
