= Needle, Thread and Knot =

Sculpture by Claes Oldenburg and Coosje van Bruggen in Milan

- Ago, Filo e Nodo (Italian)
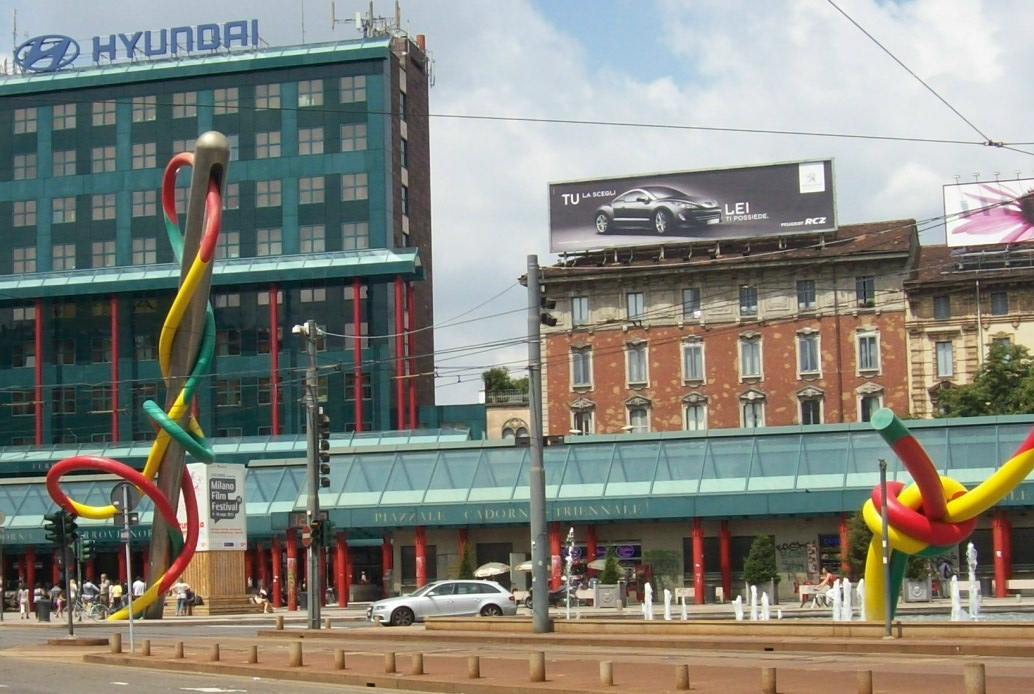
- Artist: Claes Oldenburg, Coosje van Bruggen
- Year: 2000
- Type: stainless steel, reinforced plastic, polyester gelcoat, polyurethane enamel
- Dimensions: 18 m × 20 m × 37.5 m (59 ft × 65 ft × 123 ft)
- Location: Milan; 45°28′5.24″N 9°10′35.87″E

Needle, Thread and Knot (Italian: Ago, Filo e Nodo) is a public artwork in two parts by Claes Oldenburg and Coosje van Bruggen in Piazzale Cadorna, Milan, Italy.

Commissioned by the City of Milan as part of the renovations of the Milan Cadorna railway station, and unveiled in February 2000, the sculpture is a fountain made of stainless steel and reinforced plastic, painted with polyester gelcoat and polyurethane enamel. The "knot" is placed in the middle of a fountain on the middle of the square while the sewing needle is on the footpath in front of the train station. According to the artists the needle pulling thread through fabric is a metaphor for a train going through a tunnel. The thread wrapped around a needle also "paraphrased" the city emblem of a snake coiled around a sword. According to the City of Milan, it is also meant as a tribute to Milan's influence in the fashion industry. The three thread colours (red, green, yellow) selected by the artists are meant to reflect the three lines of the Milan Metro at the time.

== See also ==
- List of works by Oldenburg and van Bruggen
