= Piazzale Cadorna =

Coordinates: 45.4681°N 9.1768°E

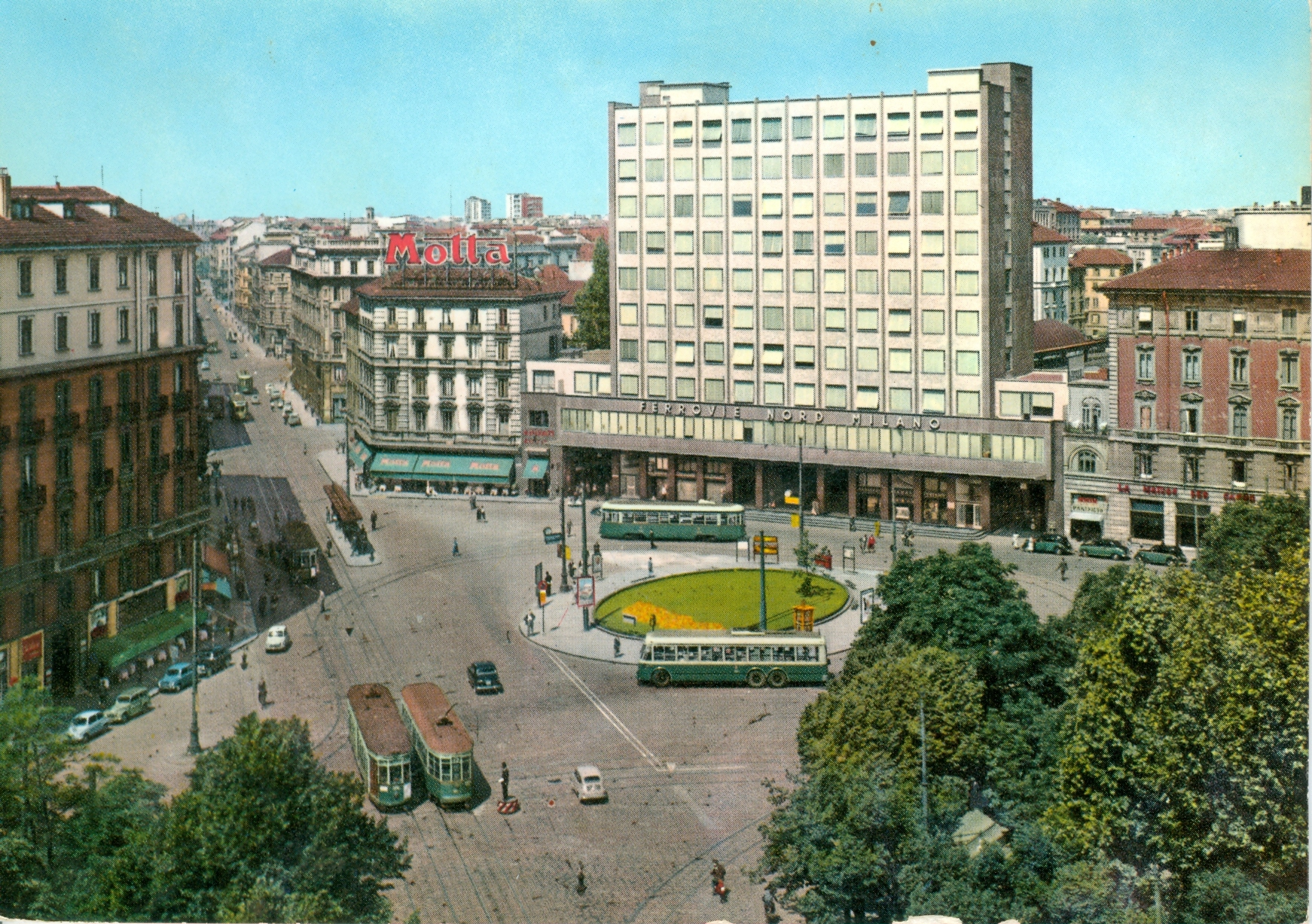
Cadorna square before the restyling

Piazzale Cadorna (Cadorna Square) is sited in the centre of Milan, near Cadorna Railway Station. The square are dedicated to Italian Field Marshal Luigi Cadorna, famous for being chief of staff of the Italian army during the First World War.

In the square is also sited the Cadorna metro station with 2 lines, green and red, of the Milan metro network.

Piazzale Cadorna is famous for the giant sculpture Needle, Thread and Knot (Ago, filo e nodo) by Claes Oldenburg and his wife Coosje van Bruggen. This sculpture was posed in the square during a massive restyling of the square on Gae Aulenti project in 1999, and represents the hard work and talent for the fashion of the city.
