= Westendstrasse 1 =

Skyscraper in Frankfurt, Germany

Westendstraße 1
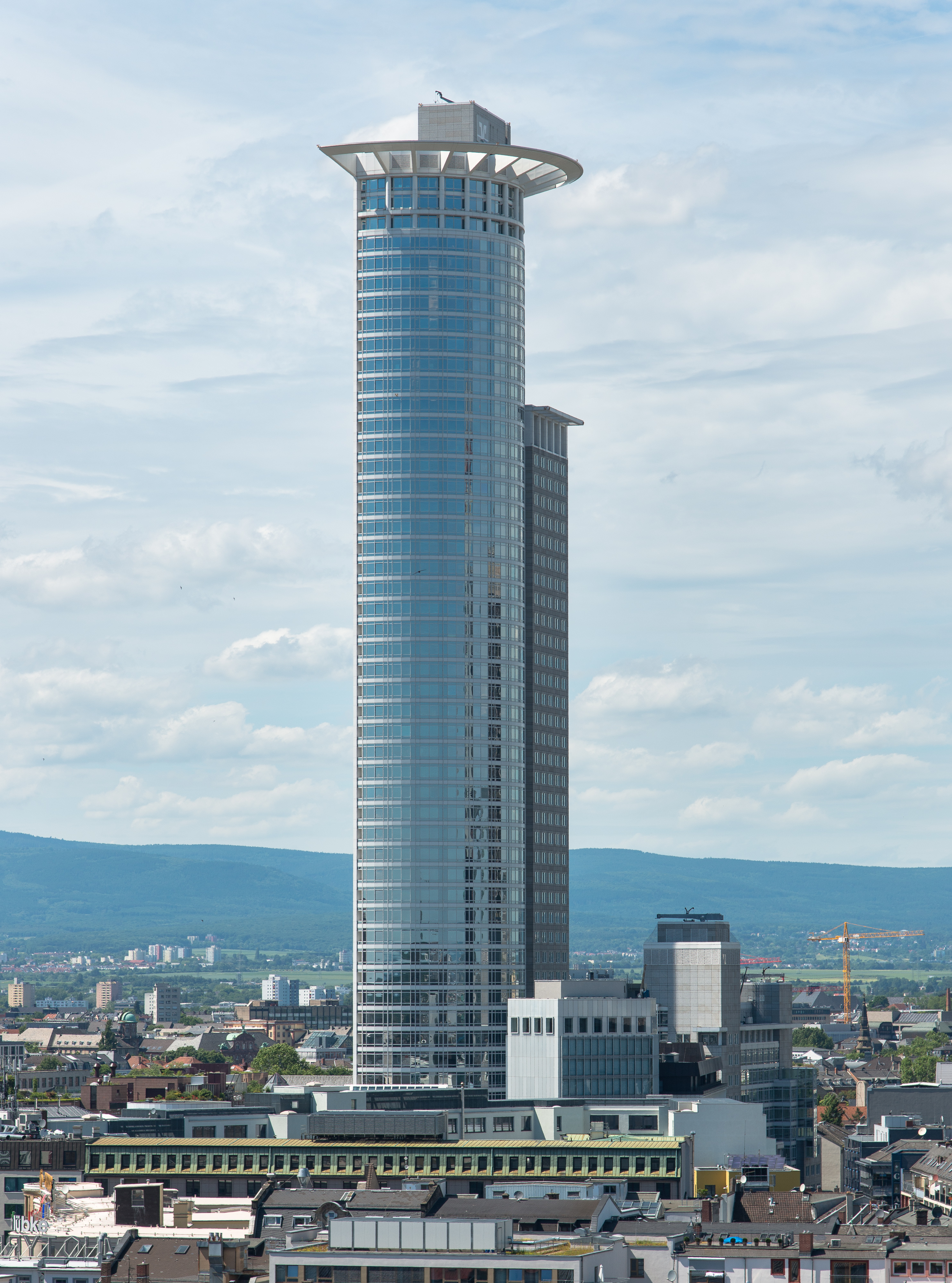
- Interactive map of the Westendstraße 1 area

General information
- Type: Commercial offices
- Location: Westendstraße 1 Frankfurt, Hesse, Germany
- Coordinates: 50°06′38″N 8°39′45″E
- Construction started: 1990
- Opening: 1993
- Cost: US$400 million

Height
- Roof: 208 m (682 ft)

Technical details
- Floor count: 53; 3 below ground
- Floor area: 80,700 m^{2} (868,600 sq ft)

Design and construction
- Architect: Kohn Pedersen Fox
- Structural engineer: BGS Ingenieursozietät; LeMessurier Consultants
- Main contractor: Hochtief

Westendstraße 1 is a 53-storey, 208 m (682 ft) skyscraper in the Westend-Süd district of Frankfurt, Germany. The structure was completed in 1993 and together with the nearby City-Haus, forms the headquarters of DZ Bank. In 1995, it won the "Best Building of the Year" award by the American Chamber of Architects in the multifunctional skyscraper category. As of 2026, the tower is the fourth-tallest skyscraper in Frankfurt and also in Germany.

== Design ==
=== Overview ===
The building, designed by Kohn Pedersen Fox, is similar in style to an older building by the same architects, 1250 René-Lévesque in Montreal, Quebec, Canada. The building is a reinforced concrete structure with a perforated façades and flat slabs. Each floor height is around 3.6 metres (12 ft) with a floor area of 950 m^{2} (10,200 sq ft). The façade consists of fine, golden granite, giving it a white and bright appearance from afar. The building was designed by architect William Pedersen. The characteristic ring beam at the top of the tower (known commonly as the crown) is intended as a reminder to Frankfurt's history as the city where German emperors were crowned. The crown faces towards the old part of Frankfurt where the coronations were held at the Frankfurt Cathedral. The 95 tonne steel crown is heated in winter to prevent the forming of icicles which could endanger pedestrians or cars on the street below.

The design for Moshe Aviv Tower, also called "City Gate" skyscraper in Ramat Gan, Israel, takes inspiration from the building.

=== Features ===
A sculpture by Claes Oldenburg and Coosje van Bruggen, called Inverted Collar and Tie is set up in front of the entrance.

== In popular culture ==
- Westendstrasse 1 appears under the name Khoury Art Foundation Building as a vanilla stage 8 Euro-Contemporary building set in SimCity 4 (Deluxe or with Rush Hour).

== Gallery ==
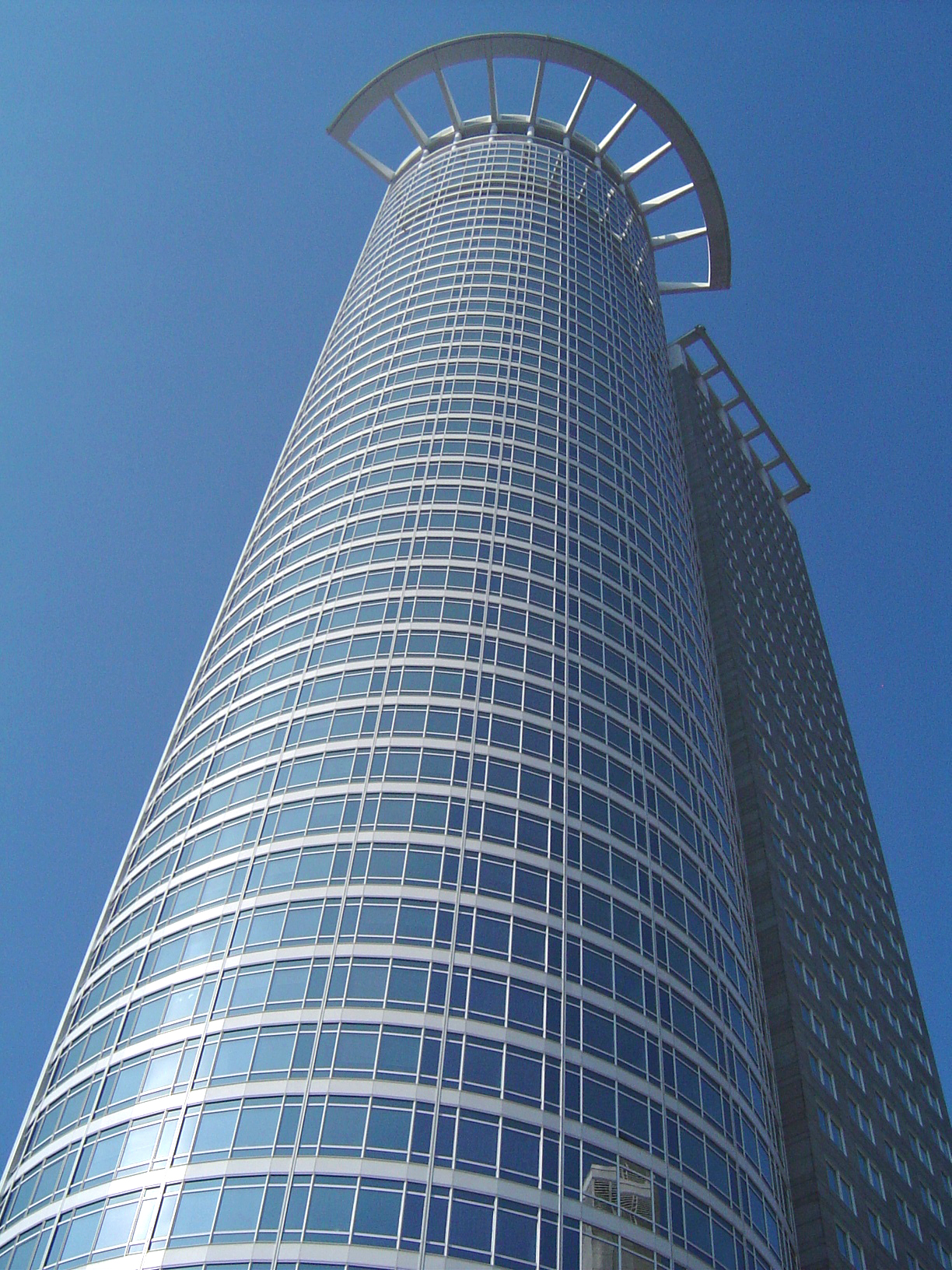

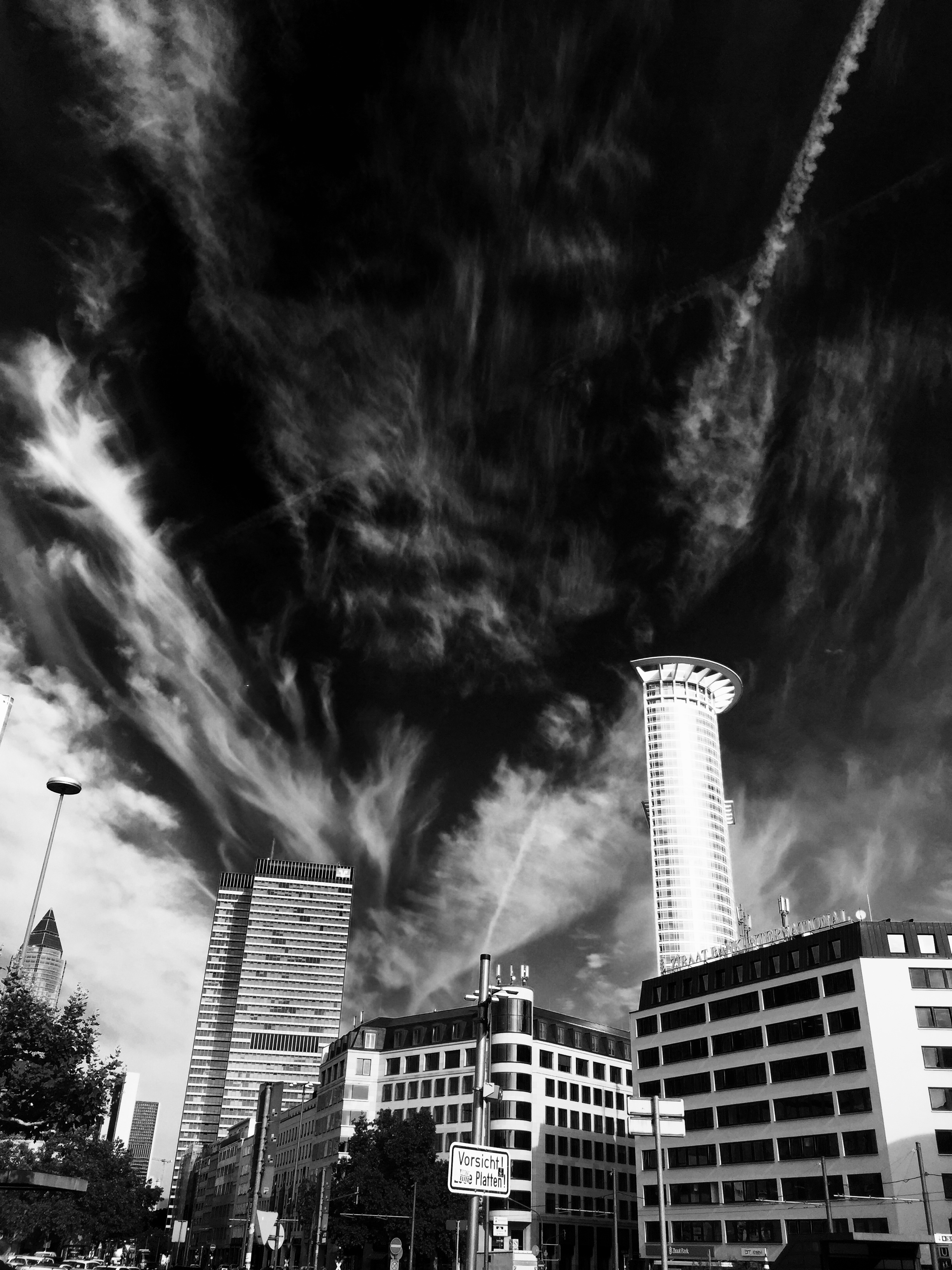

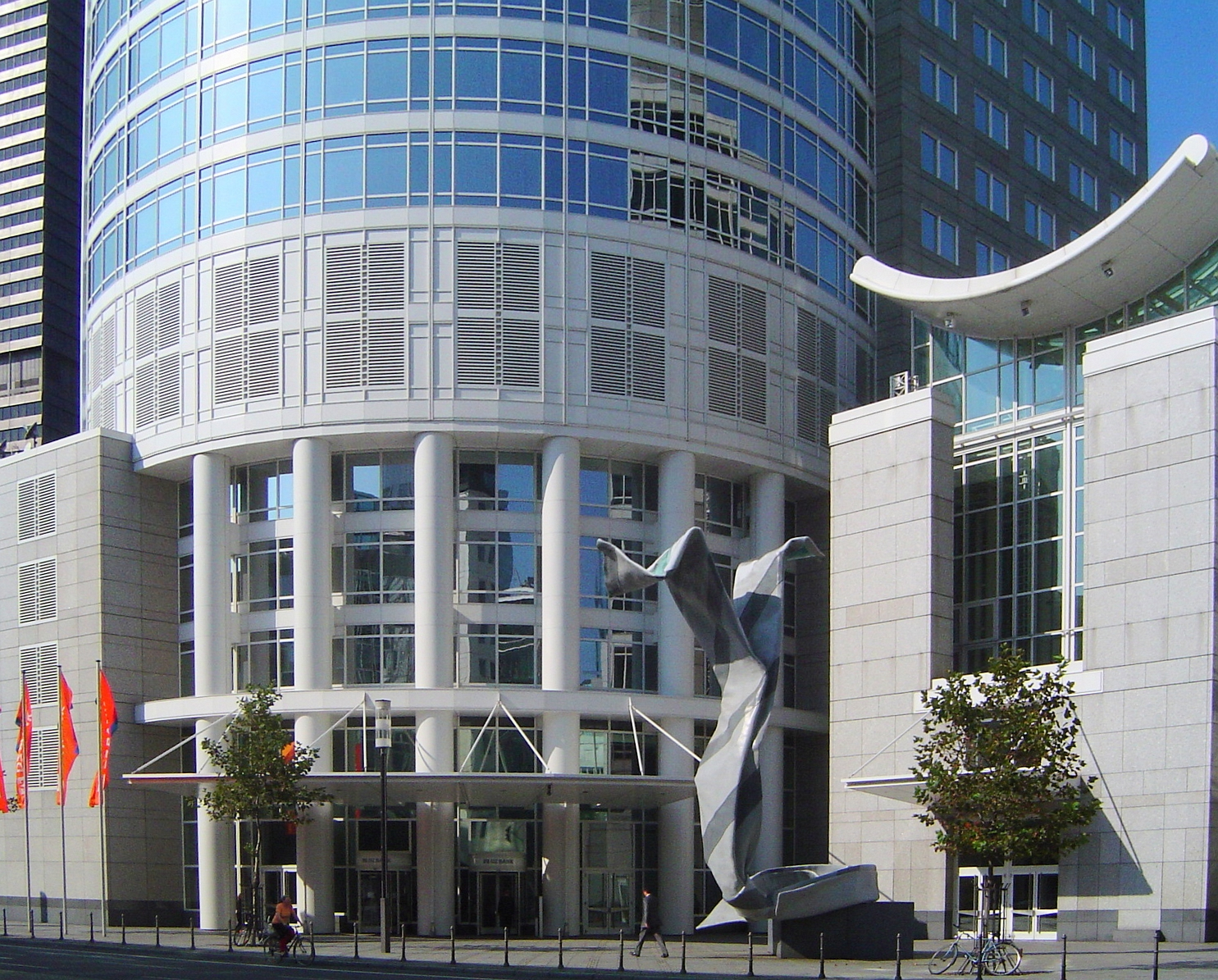

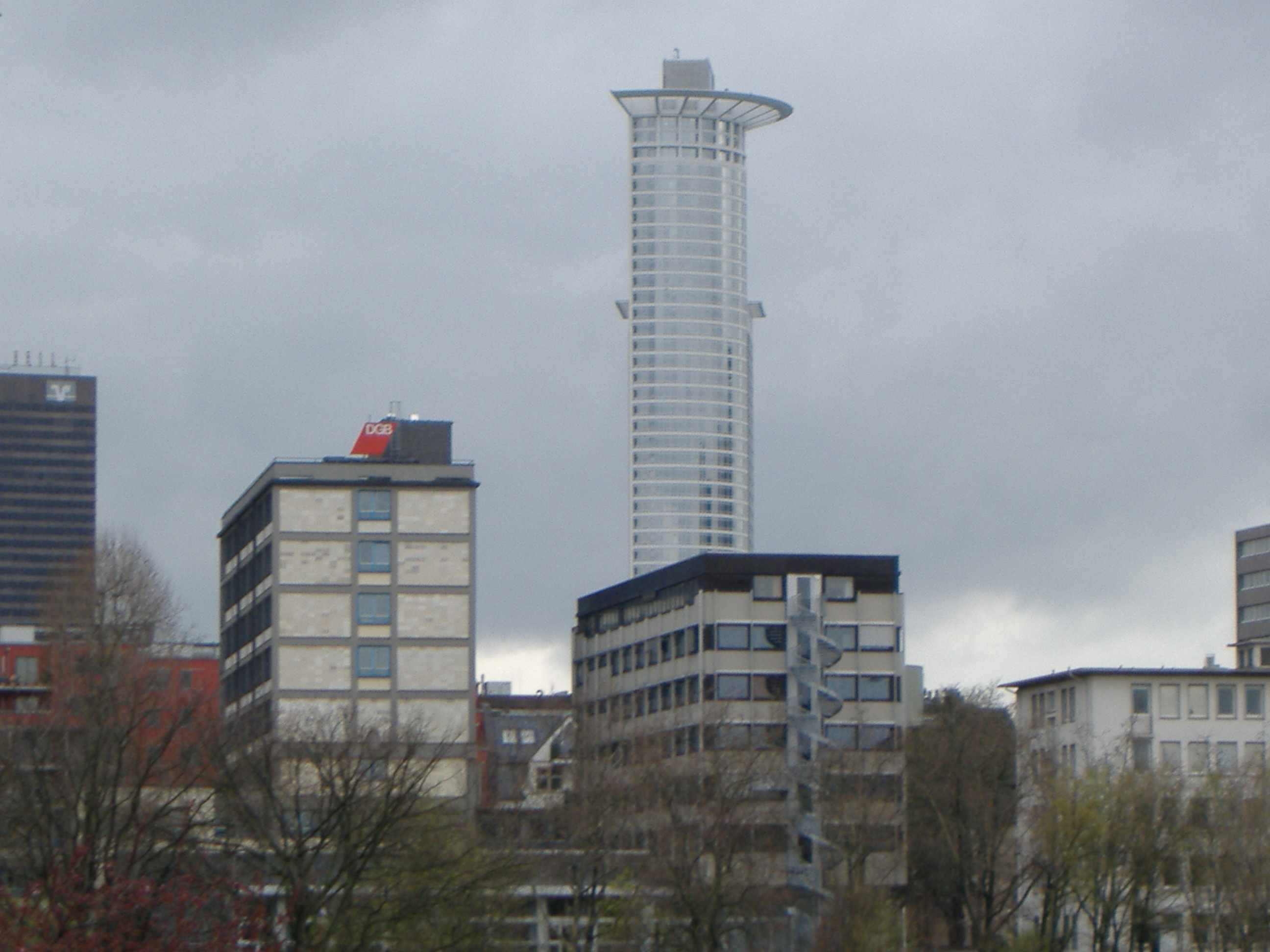

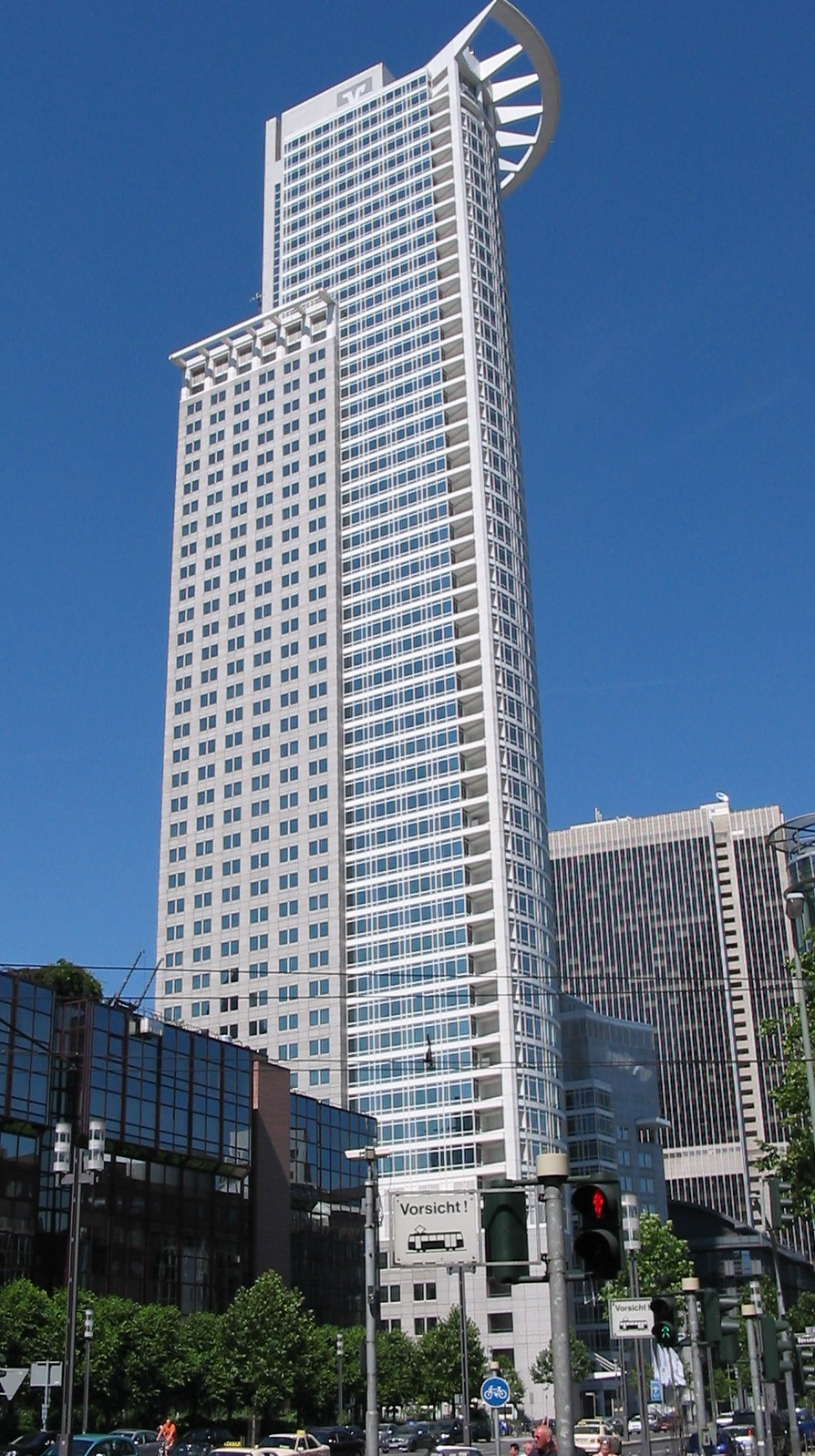

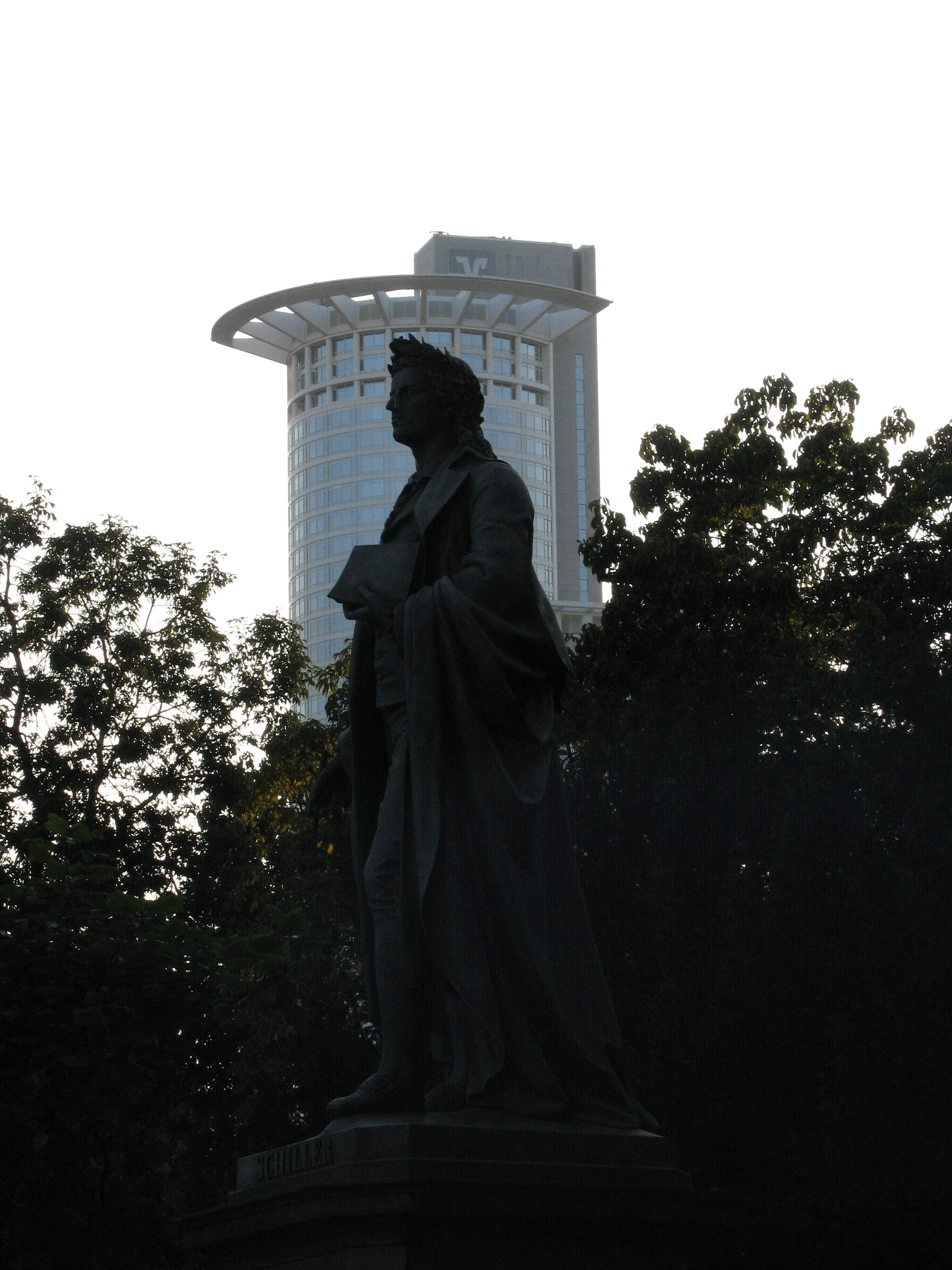

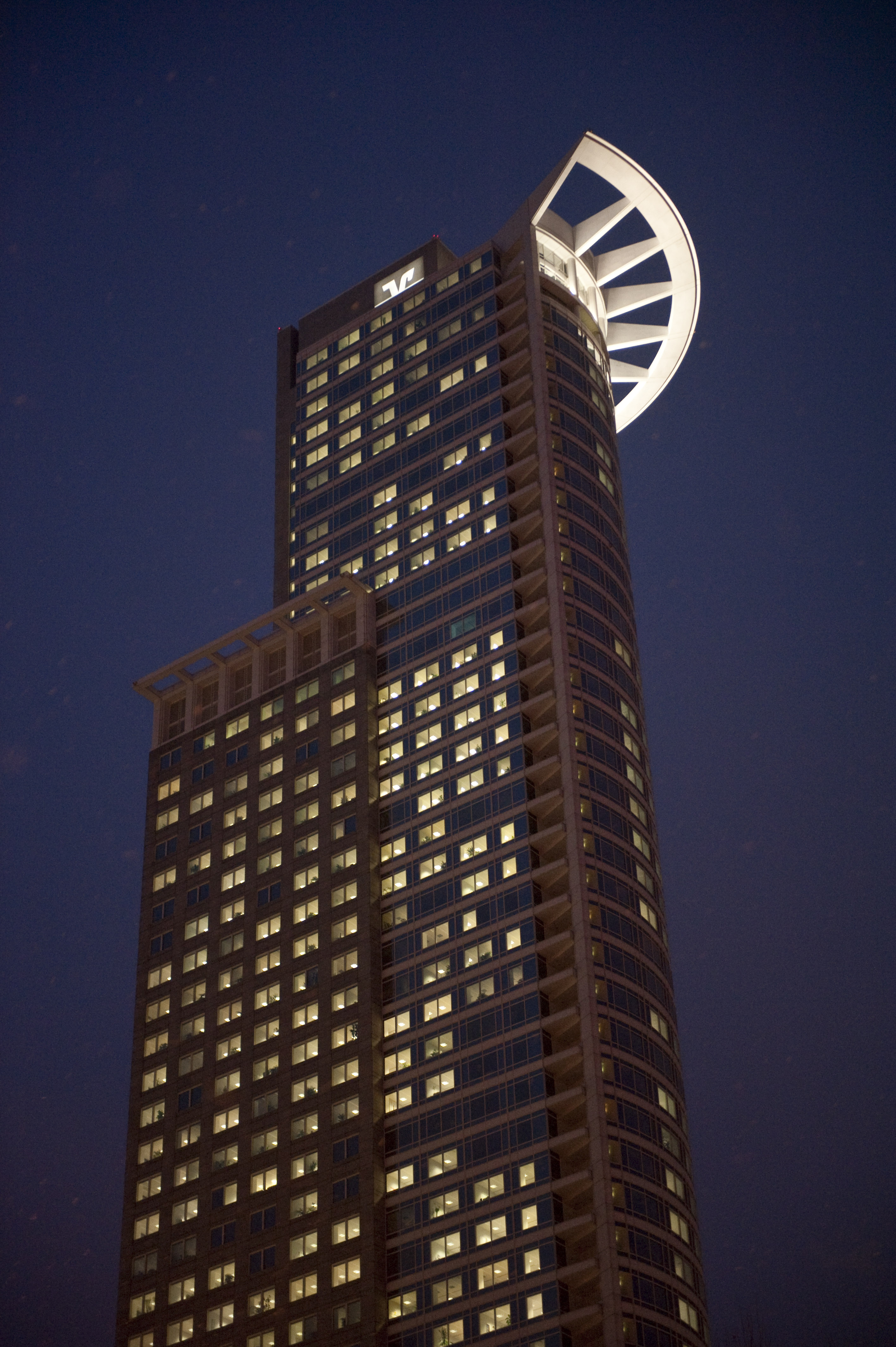

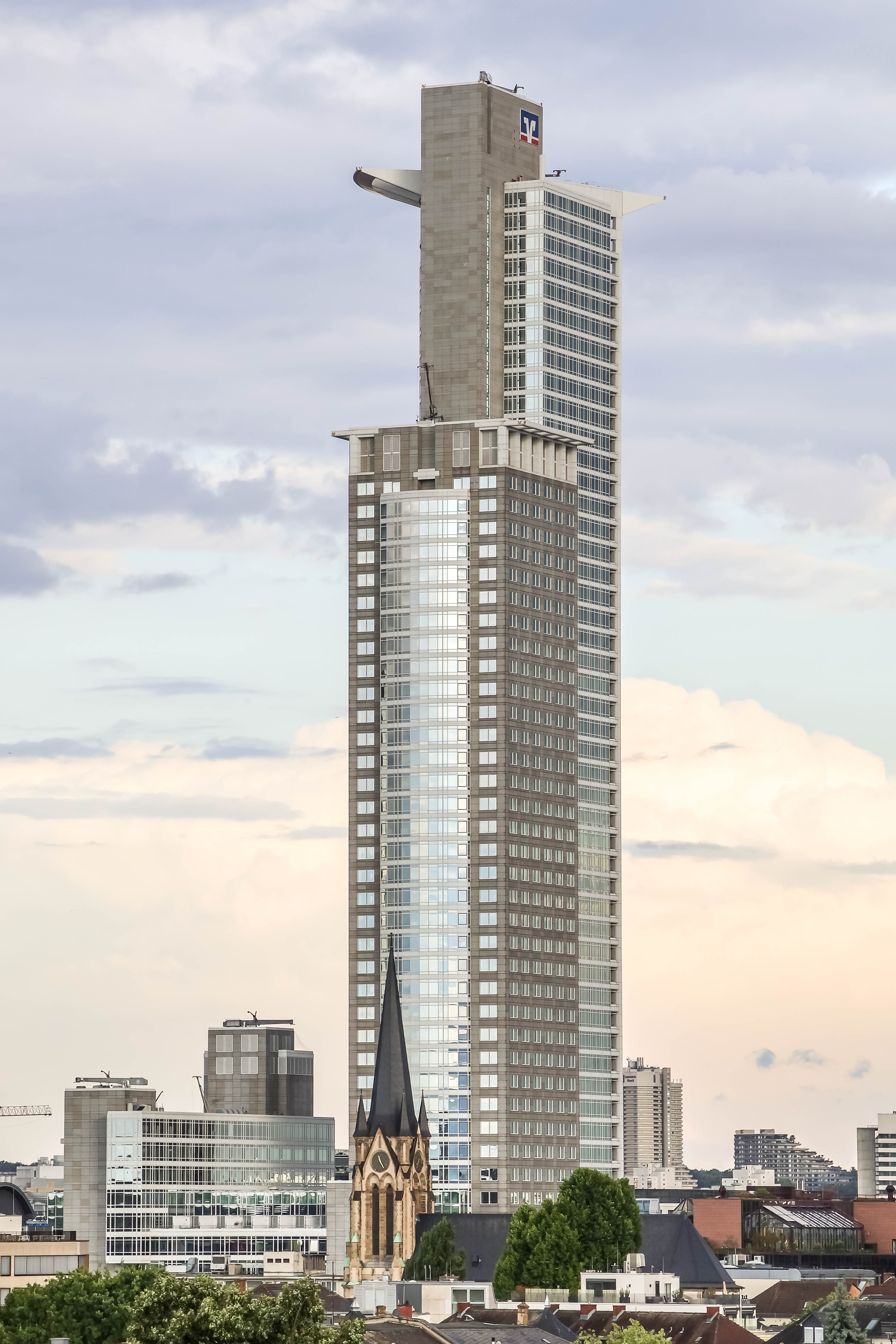

== See also ==
- List of tallest buildings in Frankfurt
- List of tallest buildings in Germany
- List of tallest buildings in Europe
