= David Pincus =

- Born: 1926
- Died: December 2011 (aged 84–85); Wynnewood, Pennsylvania, USA
- Education: Penn State University
- Known for: Clothing manufacturer and art collector
- Height: 6 ft 5 in (1.96 m)
- Spouse: Geraldine
- Children: 3

David N. Pincus (1926–December 21, 2011) was an American clothing manufacturer and art collector who, with his wife Geraldine, assembled a major personal collection of abstract expressionist artwork.

A painting from the Pincus collection, Mark Rothko's Orange, Red, Yellow, sold at auction for $86,882,500 on May 8, 2012, a record price for contemporary art.

== Early life and education ==
Pincus grew up in Philadelphia, Pennsylvania, graduating from Philadelphia's Central High School. During World War II, he served with the U.S. Merchant Marine, rising to the rank of lieutenant.

After the war he attended Pennsylvania State University, where he was a discus thrower. In 1948, he set a university record in that event and tried out for the U.S. Olympic team.

== Business career ==
After his university graduation, David Pincus joined the family business, a Philadelphia clothing manufacturing company named Pincus Bros.-Maxwell that had been established in 1911 by his father and uncles after their immigration to the U.S. from what is now Belarus. Together with his older brother Nat, David Pincus expanded the company to become one of the city's largest manufacturers of men's clothing, employing as many as 1,100 people. For 35 years the business made men's suits for Bill Blass. In 2004, Pincus Bros.-Maxwell closed its factory due to foreign competition and declining demand for its products.
