= Clothespin (Oldenburg) =

Sculpture by Claes Oldenburg

- Artist: Claes Oldenburg
- Year: 1976
- Medium: steel sculpture
- Dimensions: 14 m × 3.73 m × 1.37 m (45 ft × 12 ft 3 in × 4 ft 6 in)
- Location: Philadelphia; 39.9524°N 75.1656°W
- Owner: private

Clothespin is a weathering steel sculpture by Claes Oldenburg, located at Centre Square, 1500 Market Street, Philadelphia. It is designed to appear as a monumental black clothespin. Oldenburg is noted for his attempts to democratize art with large stylized sculptures of everyday objects, and the location of Clothespin, above Philadelphia's 15th Street/City Hall station, allows thousands of commuters to view it on a daily basis. It was commissioned in May 1974 by developer Jack Wolgin as part of the Philadelphia Redevelopment Authority's percent for art program, and was dedicated June 25, 1976.

Made of Cor-Ten steel, Clothespin is praised by art critics for its velvety texture and weathered, warm reddish-brown color. The silvery steel "spring" part of the two-textured work resembles the numerals "76", apt for the United States Bicentennial year. Tying in Philadelphia's colonial heritage with its difficult present, Clothespin addresses the city's civic issues and tries to bridge gaps across income levels through its universally recognized form. The design has been likened to the "embracing couple" in Constantin Brâncuși's sculpture The Kiss in the Philadelphia Museum of Art.

There are at least two small-scale models of the sculpture. The first normally stays in the Oldenburg gallery at the Denver Art Museum: Clothespin – 4 Foot Version, completed in 1974. The second, a 10-foot version completed in 1975, is located and occasionally displayed in the Contemporary Art department of the Art Institute of Chicago.

== See also ==
- List of public art in Philadelphia
- List of works by Oldenburg and van Bruggen
