= Lipstick (Ascending) on Caterpillar Tracks =

Sculpture by Claes Oldenburg

- Artist: Claes Oldenburg
- Year: 1969
- Type: weathering steel
- Dimensions: 740 cm × 760 cm × 330 cm (292 in × 299 in × 131 in)
- Location: Yale University, Connecticut; 41.31291500°N 72.93009800°W
- Owner: Yale University

Lipstick (Ascending) on Caterpillar Tracks is a weathering steel sculpture by Claes Oldenburg. It is currently located in the Yale University Art Gallery sculpture garden, at Yale University, in New Haven, Connecticut.

== History ==
Stuart Wrede and a group of fellow Yale architecture students raised money under the name of the Colossal Keepsake Corporation of Connecticut, working in collaboration with Oldenburg, who charged no fee for his work. The piece was installed on the campus on May 15, 1969, in Beinecke Plaza, as a speakers' platform for anti-war protests. (In the autumn of 1969, women were admitted to Yale University, leading some to view the sculpture as a symbol of female empowerment and coeducation.)

The original iteration had a soft, inflated lipstick section, and wooden treads. The sculpture deteriorated and was removed by Oldenburg in March 1970. It was redone in weathering steel and fiberglass, and reinstalled at Morse College, on October 17, 1974. As of 2019, Wrede was leading an effort to move the piece back to its original location in Beinecke Plaza. It was moved to the Yale University Art Gallery's sculpture garden in December 2025 after being vandalized.

Lipstick (Ascending) on Caterpillar Tracks has been shown at the Guggenheim Museum and National Gallery of Art.

== See also ==
- List of works by Oldenburg and van Bruggen
