= Spoonbridge and Cherry =

Sculpture by Claes Oldenburg and Coosje van Bruggen in Minneapolis, MN, US

Coordinates: 44°58′12.9″N 93°17′20.7″W

- Spoonbridge and Cherry in 2008
- Artist: Claes Oldenburg; Coosje van Bruggen
- Year: 1988
- Medium: Stainless steel and aluminum sculpture
- Dimensions: 9 m × 4.1 m × 15.7 m (30 ft × 13 ft × 52 ft)
- Location: Minneapolis Sculpture Garden, Minneapolis

Spoonbridge and Cherry is a sculptural fountain designed by Claes Oldenburg and Coosje van Bruggen. It was funded by a $500,000 donation from art collector Frederick R. Weisman and is permanently located in the Minneapolis Sculpture Garden. The piece was completed and installed in 1988 for the Sculpture Garden's opening and consists of a large cherry resting atop a large spoon partially straddling a small pond.

== History ==
In the mid-1980s, the Walker Art Center in Minneapolis, Minnesota, commissioned a piece of work from married couple Claes Oldenburg and Coosje van Bruggen, whose first artistic collaboration had come in 1976. The work, which had its $500,000 budget donated by art collector Frederick R. Weisman, was to be placed in the new outdoor Minneapolis Sculpture Garden across Vineland Place from the Walker on land owned by the Minneapolis Park and Recreation Board.

An early concept for the sculpture was a Viking ship with a dragon figurehead set in a circular reflecting pool; a 1986 article in the Star Tribune describes this vision as having been "quickly abandoned". The iconography of the spoon had been present in Oldenburg's work for a number of years since he acquired a piece of kitsch depicting a spoon atop a mass of chocolate in 1962. The cherry was contributed by van Bruggen, who found inspiration in the formality of the sculpture garden's design, in the Palace of Versailles, and in the dining etiquette of Louis XIV's court. Walker curator Siri Engberg said in 2013 that the bowl of the spoon was associated with "the prow of a Viking ship, a duck rising out of the water, various flora and fauna, [and] ice skating" for Oldenburg and van Bruggen. Martin Friedman, director of the Walker, said of the work that the artists did not intend to craft a "sculptural symbol of Minneapolis" but that he believed Spoonbridge and Cherry would "be a landmark and [would] give a lot of people pleasure".

The piece was fabricated between 1987 and 1988 at two shipyards, one in Boothbay, Maine, and the other in Bristol, Rhode Island, and finished in New Haven, Connecticut, at sculpture fabricator Lippincott, Inc. It was placed in the northern portion of the Sculpture Garden by two cranes on May 9, 1988. The Sculpture Garden held opening ceremonies September 9–11 of that year, with an official dedication on September 10 featuring a band of spoon players.

Spoonbridge and Cherry was entirely repainted in 1995. In 2012, the word "Kony" was spray painted onto the sculpture's spoon, possibly as part of Invisible Children's Cover the Night campaign, requiring the sculpture to be scrubbed and repaired, which Walker staff were able to complete within 48 hours. In 2021, the cherry of the Spoonbridge and Cherry was sent to New York to be entirely repainted again. It was returned to the Minneapolis Sculpture Garden in 2022.

== Design ==
Spoonbridge and Cherry measures 30 by 52 by 13 feet (9 m × 15.7 m × 4.1 m) and straddles a small pond built in the shape of a linden tree seed, evoking the lindens in the surrounding park. The pond's shores were lined with irises and reeds. The sculpture is built from stainless steel and aluminum and coated with polyurethane enamel. The cherry portion of the piece weighs 1,199 pounds (544 kg) while the spoon portion weighs 5,800 pounds (2,630 kg).

The sculpture emits filtered water from both the tip and the base of the cherry's stem, the latter intended to keep the cherry gleaming in the light.

== Reception ==
The editors of Phaidon Press wrote favorably of the sculpture's placement in a park frequented by families, writing that the "surprise of finding a oversized fruit spooned up in a park, together with its curved forms and the bright colour, creates a sensuous joy that makes the work immediately accessible to a wide audience, including children."

Writing in the Star Tribune a year after the Sculpture Garden's opening, Chris Waddington found the linden seed pond critical to enjoying Spoonbridge, writing that in winter months when the pond was frozen and snowed over, the sculpture "can seem like a soulless mock-up, a quirky idea that lost its charm somewhere between the artist's hand and the factory where it was built; but with spring comes the fountain's spray, the pool's play of liquid reflections on steel and an animate charge that recalls the poetry of the artists' original sketches."

Within a decade of the Sculpture Garden's opening, the Star Tribune reported that Spoonbridge was "something of an icon for the Walker". In 2001, Eric Dregni wrote that the sculpture had "become the unofficial symbol of Minneapolis" and in 2008, City Pages described it as "one of the Twin Cities' most iconic images." The Walker reported receiving more requests for images of Spoonbridge and Cherry than any other work in its collections.
