= Coosje van Bruggen =

Dutch and American sculptor and painter

- van Bruggen and her husband, Claes Oldenburg
- Born: Jacoba Wilhelmina Hendrika van Bruggen; June 6, 1942; Groningen, Netherlands
- Died: January 10, 2009 (aged 66); Los Angeles, California, U.S.
- Known for: Sculpture
- Notable work: List of public art by Oldenburg and van Bruggen
- Spouses: Paul Kapteyn (before 1977); Claes Oldenburg (m. 1977)
- Children: 2

Coosje van Bruggen (June 6, 1942 – January 10, 2009) was a Dutch-born American sculptor, art historian, and critic. She collaborated extensively with her husband, Claes Oldenburg.

== Biography ==
Born to a physician in Groningen, van Bruggen studied history of art at the University of Groningen. From 1967 to 1971, she worked at the Stedelijk Museum in Amsterdam. Van Bruggen married her first husband Paul Kapteyn, they had two children, Maartje Kapteyn and Paulus Kapteyn. In Amsterdam she worked with environmental artists like Doug Wheeler, Larry Bell, and the members of the Dutch avant-garde. Until 1976, van Bruggen taught at the Academy for Art and Industries in Enschede. She married her second husband, Claes Oldenburg, in 1977 and moved to New York the following year. In 1993, she became a United States citizen.

== Work ==
She began working with her new husband, sculptor Claes Oldenburg, in 1976. Her first work with Oldenburg came when she helped him install his 41-foot Trowel I on the grounds of the Kröller-Müller Museum in Otterlo. Together Oldenburg and van Bruggen produced three decades of monumental sculpture that van Bruggen would call Large-Scale Projects, with their first piece created as a team being Flashlight (1981), a huge outdoor sculpture at the University of Nevada, Las Vegas. In Los Angeles, Collar and Bow - a 65-foot metal and fiberglass sculpture in the shape of a man's dress shirt collar and bow tie, designed for a spot outside Walt Disney Concert Hall was stalled and eventually canceled due to technical problems and escalating costs. In 1988, her work with Oldenburg entitled Spoonbridge and Cherry was commissioned by the Walker Art Center. It became a permanent fixture of the Minneapolis Sculpture Garden as well as an iconic image of the city of Minneapolis. Their final joint work, fabricated in Turin, Italy and titled Tumbling Tacks (2009), was designed for the Kistefos Sculpture Park in the countryside north of Oslo.

At her instigation, the couple branched out into indoor installation and performance art. In 1985 they collaborated on Il Corso del Coltello (“The Course of the Knife”), a performance piece in Venice, Italy, with the architect Frank Gehry, whom van Bruggen had met in 1982 when she was on the selection committee for documenta 7 in Kassel.

Since the early 1980s van Bruggen worked as an independent critic and curator. She contributed articles to Artforum magazine from 1983 to 1988, and served as senior critic in the sculpture department at Yale University School of Art in 1996–97.

Van Bruggen was the author of scholarly books and essays on the work of major contemporary artists including Gerhard Richter (1985), John Baldessari (1990), Bruce Nauman (1991), and Hanne Darboven (1991). She also wrote a monograph on architect Frank O. Gehry's Guggenheim Museum in Bilbao, Spain.

Van Bruggen and Oldenburg were based in New York for many years, but they also lived and worked for extensive periods in Los Angeles and, since 1992, at Château de la Borde in Beaumont-sur-Dême, in the Loire Valley of France.

One U.S. installation the pair collaborated on is the fiberglass and steel Cupid's Span, which was commissioned by GAP founders Donald and Doris F. Fisher, and installed in the newly built Rincon Park along the Embarcadero in San Francisco in 2002.

In 2021, Pace Gallery presented an exhibition of van Bruggen's collaborative work with Claes Oldenburg spanning the 1980s to the late 2000s.

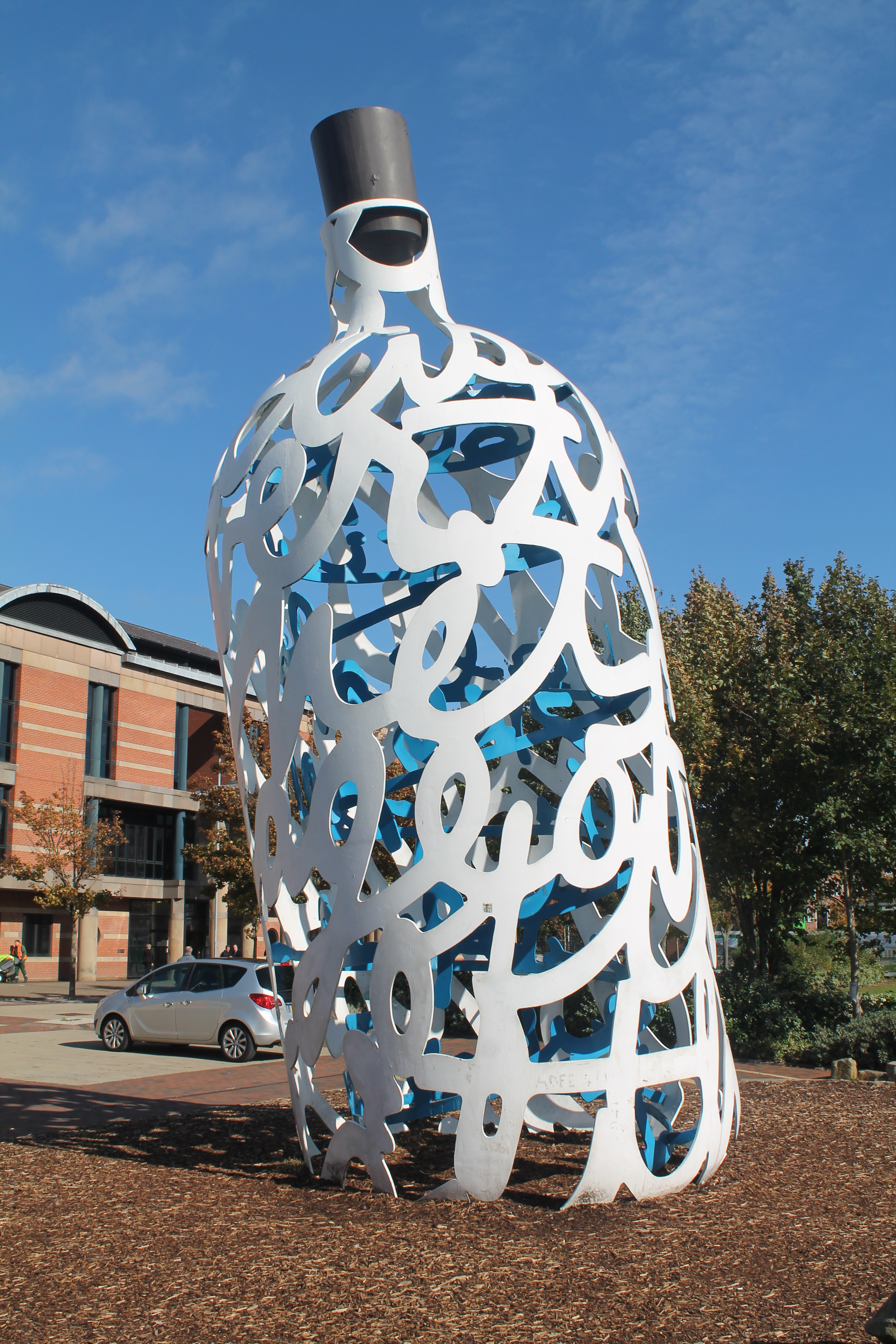
Bottle O'Notes (Middlesbrough)

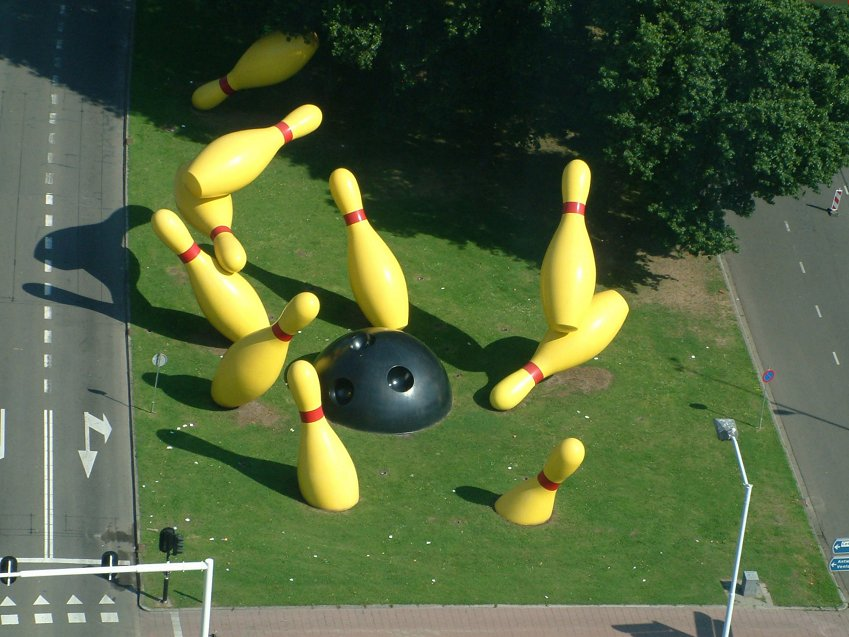
Flying Pins (2000), Eindhoven

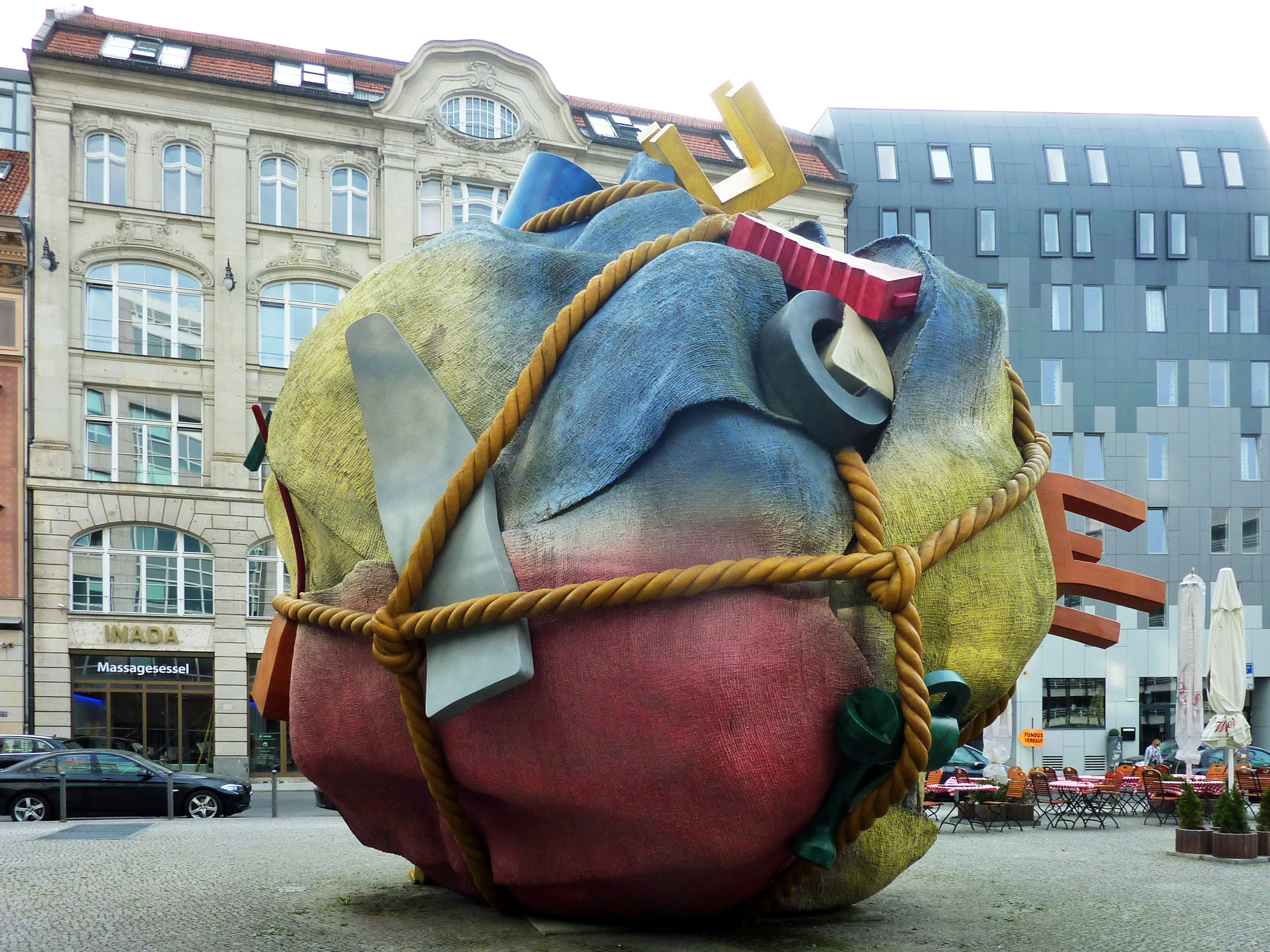
Houseball, Berlin

== Awards ==
Together with Oldenburg, van Bruggen received numerous awards including the Distinction in Sculpture, Sculpture Center, New York (1994); Nathaniel S. Saltonstall Award, Institute of Contemporary Art, Boston (1996); Partners in Education Award, Solomon R. Guggenheim Museum, New York (2002); the Medal Award, School of the Museum of Fine Arts, Boston (2004) and honorary degrees from the California College of the Arts, San Francisco, California (1996); University of Teesside, Middlesbrough, England (1999); Nova Scotia College of Art and Design, Halifax, Nova Scotia (2005); and the College for Creative Studies in Detroit, Michigan (2005).

The estate of van Bruggen is represented by The Pace Gallery, New York.

== Death ==
After a long battle with breast cancer, van Bruggen died at her residence in Los Angeles in 2009, aged 66.

== Sculptures ==
- Pool Balls (1977), Münster
- Spitzhacke (1982), Kassel
- Gartenschlauch (1983), Freiburg im Breisgau
- Screwarch (1983), Rotterdam
- Cross section of a Toothbrush with Paste, in a Cup, on a Sink: Portrait of Coosje's Thinking (1983), Krefeld
- Balancing Tools (1984), Weil am Rhein
- Knife Ship I (1985), Bilbao
- Spoonbridge and Cherry (1988), Minneapolis
- Bicyclette Ensevelie (1990) Parc de la Villette, Paris
- Free Stamp (1991) Willard Park, Cleveland
- Mistos (1992), Barcelona
- Bottle of Notes (1993), Middlesbrough
- Inverted Collar and Tie (1994), Frankfurt
- Houseball (1996), Berlin
- Torn Notebook (1996), Lincoln, Nebraska
- Lion's Tail (1999), Venice
- Ago, Filo e Nodo (2000), Milan
- Flying Pins (2000), Eindhoven
- Dropped Cone (2001), Cologne
- Cupid's Span (2002), San Francisco
- Spiral (2006), Seoul
- Clothespin (1976), Philadelphia
- Split Button (1981), Philadelphia

== See also ==
- Women in the art history field
