= List of Guggenheim Fellowships awarded in 1971 =

A total of 354 scholars, artists, and scientists received Guggenheim Fellowships in 1971. $3,787,000 was disbursed between the recipients, who were chosen from an applicant pool of 2,363. Of the 96 universities represented, Harvard University boasted the most faculty winners (21), with University of California, Berkeley in second (19) and Columbia University in third (15). This was the first time in several years that Berkeley did not have the most winners.

== 1971 United States and Canada fellows ==
Category	Field of Study	Fellow	Institutional association	Research topic	Notes	Ref
Creative Arts	Choreography	Twyla Tharp	Twyla Tharp Dance		Also won in 1974	
Creative Arts	Drama and Performance Art	Julie Bovasso	Sarah Lawrence College			
Creative Arts	Drama and Performance Art	Ed Bullins		Playwriting	Also won in 1976	
Creative Arts	Drama and Performance Art	Lonnie Carter		Creative writing for theater		
Creative Arts	Drama and Performance Art	Charles Ludlam				
Creative Arts	Drama and Performance Art	Rochelle Owens				
Creative Arts	Drama and Performance Art	Sam Shepard			Also won in 1968	
Creative Arts	Drama and Performance Art	Richard Ernest Whitehall				
Creative Arts	Fiction	Robert Coover		Writing	Also won in 1974	
Creative Arts	Fiction	Victor Kolpacoff	Hobart and William Smith Colleges (visiting)	Writing		
Creative Arts	Fiction	Wilfrid Sheed	Princeton University	Writing		
Creative Arts	Fiction	Henry L. Van Dyke Jr.	Kent State University (in residence)	Writing		
Creative Arts	Film	James A. Herbert	University of Georgia	Four Films: Fig, Pear I, Pear II, and Plum	Also won in 1989	
Creative Arts	Film	Richard L. Myers	Kent State University		Also won in 1969	
Creative Arts	Fine Arts	Ben Berns	University of North Carolina, Greensboro (visiting)	Sculpture		
Creative Arts	Fine Arts	Harry D. Bouras	Columbia College Chicago	Sculpture		
Creative Arts	Fine Arts	Rosemarie Castoro		Painting		
Creative Arts	Fine Arts	Donald De Mauro	SUNY Binghamton	Lithographic printing process		
Creative Arts	Fine Arts	Dale Eldred	Kansas City Art Institute	Sculpture		
Creative Arts	Fine Arts	Sam Gilliam		Painting		
Creative Arts	Fine Arts	Peter Golfinopoulos	Art Students League	Painting		
Creative Arts	Fine Arts	Charles S. Klabunde	Cooper Union	Etchings inspired by the I Ching		
Creative Arts	Fine Arts	Vincent Longo	Hunter College, CUNY	Graphics		
Creative Arts	Fine Arts	David Novros		Painting		
Creative Arts	Fine Arts	Peter Passuntino		Graphics		
Creative Arts	Fine Arts	Philip Pearlstein	Brooklyn College	Painting		
Creative Arts	Fine Arts	Murray Reich	Bard College	Painting		
Creative Arts	Fine Arts	Edward Ruscha		Graphics		
Creative Arts	Fine Arts	Richard Serra		Sculpture		
Creative Arts	Fine Arts	George Smith	Hunter College, CUNY	Sculpture		
Creative Arts	Fine Arts	Kimber Smith	Dayton Art Institute	Painting		
Creative Arts	Fine Arts	Michael Steiner		Sculpture		
Creative Arts	Fine Arts	Doug Wheeler		"Experiments in Environments"		
Creative Arts	Music Composition	Michael Brozen		Composing		
Creative Arts	Music Composition	Marc-Antonio Consoli		Composing	Also won in 1979	
Creative Arts	Music Composition	Barbara Kolb		Composing	Also won in 1976	
Creative Arts	Music Composition	İlhan Mimaroğlu		Composing		
Creative Arts	Music Composition	Charles Mingus	New York State University at Buffalo	Composing	Also won in 1978	
Creative Arts	Music Composition	Loren Rush		Composing		
Creative Arts	Music Composition	Robert Leigh Selig		Composing	Also won in 1977	
Creative Arts	Music Composition	Halsey Stevens	University of Southern California	Composing	Also won in 1964	
Creative Arts	Music Composition	Olly W. Wilson	University of California, Berkeley	Composing	Also won in 1977	
Creative Arts	Photography	Claudia Love		Yanomami people	Also won in 1977	
Creative Arts	Photography	Mark Cohen	King's College	Travel to Ireland and Greece	Also won in 1976	
Creative Arts	Photography	Len Gittleman	Harvard University			
Creative Arts	Photography	Chauncey Hare		Domestic scenes of working-class people	Also won in 1969, 1976	
Creative Arts	Photography	Enrico Natali	School of the Art Institute of Chicago	Series: American Landscapes		
Creative Arts	Photography	Cervin Robinson				
Creative Arts	Photography	Henry Wessel		"U.S. highways and the adjacent landscape"	Also won in 1978	
Creative Arts	Poetry	Tom Clark	The Paris Review	Writing		
Creative Arts	Poetry	Robert Creeley	San Francisco State College (visiting)	Writing	Also won in 1964	
Creative Arts	Poetry	Robert Fitzgerald	Harvard University	Verse translation of the Iliad	Also won in 1952	
Creative Arts	Poetry	Thomas Kinsella	Temple University	Anthology of Irish tradition	Also won in 1968	
Creative Arts	Poetry	Thom Gunn	University of California, Berkeley	House in San Francisco		
Creative Arts	Poetry	Ruth Stone		New roof for her home	Also won in 1975	
Humanities	African Studies	David W. Cohen	Johns Hopkins University	Precolonial history of the East African Lake Victoria region		
Humanities	American Literature	Millicent Bell	Boston University			
Humanities	American Literature	John Clendenning	Valley State College	Life and thoughts of Josiah Royce		
Humanities	American Literature	Hamlin L. Hill	University of Chicago			
Humanities	American Literature	Dan E. McCall	Cornell University	Critical study of James Agee		
Humanities	American Literature	Larry Neal	Yale University	Contemporary Afro-American culture		
Humanities	American Literature	Ernest Samuels	Northwestern University	Bernard Berenson biography	Also won in 1955	
Humanities	American Literature	Milton R. Stern	University of Connecticut	Politics of American literature		
Humanities	American Literature	Hyatt H. Waggoner	Brown University	Ralph Waldo Emerson as a poet	Also won in 1964	
Humanities	Architecture, Planning and Design	Walter L. Creese	University of Illinois			
Humanities	Architecture, Planning and Design	Bernard Rudofsky			Also won in 1963, 1964	
Humanities	Bibliography	J. Periam Danton	University of California, Berkeley	Comparative librarianship		
Humanities	Bibliography	Robert B. Downs	University of Illinois	Bibliographical guide to research resources in Britain (published 1973)		
Humanities	Biography	Matthew J. Bruccoli	University of South Carolina	Biography of John O'Hara		
Humanities	Biography	Ved Mehta	The New Yorker		Also won in 1977	
Humanities	Biography	Richard Winston				
Humanities	British History	Arthur B. Ferguson	Duke University	How the people of 16th-century Tudor England thought of themselves in relationship to the past		
Humanities	British History	Alfred M. Gollin	University of California, Santa Barbara	Battle of Britain	Also won in 1961, 1964	
Humanities	British History	Katherine S. Van Eerde	Muhlenberg College	John Ogilby		
Humanities	Classics	Steele Commager	Amherst College			
Humanities	Classics	George Patrick Goold	Harvard University			
Humanities	Classics	Wesley D. Smith	University of Pennsylvania			
Humanities	Dance Studies	Arlene Croce			Also won in 1985	
Humanities	East Asian Studies	Donald Keene	Columbia University		Also won in 1961	
Humanities	East Asian Studies	James Jo-Yu Liu	Stanford University			
Humanities	English Literature	Leo Braudy	Columbia University			
Humanities	English Literature	Patricia B. Craddock	Goucher College	Biography of Edward Gibbon		
Humanities	English Literature	Robert C. Elliott	University of California, San Diego	Genre criticism	Also won in 1962	
Humanities	English Literature	Philip J. Finkelpearl	Lehman College	Historical and critical study of Beaumont and Fletcher's plays		
Humanities	English Literature	William E. Fredeman	University of British Columbia	19th-century pre-Raphealite literary movement in England	Also won in 1965	
Humanities	English Literature	Irving Howe	Hunter College, CUNY	Jewish experience in America	Also won in 1964	
Humanities	English Literature	George L. Levine	Livingston College	Conventions of realism in the 19th-century novel		
Humanities	English Literature	Robert B. Martin	Princeton University		Also won in 1983	
Humanities	English Literature	Stanley Stewart	University of California, Riverside			
Humanities	English Literature	Helen H. Vendler	Boston University			
Humanities	English Literature	Don Marion Wolfe	Brooklyn College			
Humanities	Fine Arts Research	Robert L. Herbert	Yale University	Evolution of a secular iconography in French painting, 1850-1920		
Humanities	Fine Arts Research	Sam Hunter	Princeton University			
Humanities	Fine Arts Research	Bates Lowry	Princeton University			
Humanities	Fine Arts Research	Harold Edwin Wethey	University of Michigan		Also won in 1949	
Humanities	Folklore and Popular Culture	Richard M. Dorson	Indiana University		Also won in 1949, 1964	
Humanities	Folklore and Popular Culture	Bruce Jackson	University at Buffalo	Historical and psychological study of Afro-American folklore		
Humanities	French History	Nathanael Greene	Wesleyan University	French provincial politics in the 1930s		
Humanities	French Literature	Marcel Gutwirth	Haverford College		Also won in 1985	
Humanities	French Literature	Joseph H. McMahon	Wesleyan University	Jean-Jacques Rousseau's La nouvelle Héloïse		
Humanities	French Literature	Eléonore M. Zimmermann	University of Rochester			
Humanities	General Nonfiction	David Cort	Life			
Humanities	General Nonfiction	Leonard Kriegel	City College of New York			
Humanities	General Nonfiction	Peter Schrag	University of Massachusetts, Amherst (visiting)	Politics of social disintegration		
Humanities	German and East European History	Jerome Blum	Princeton University		Also won in 1951	
Humanities	German and East European History	H. G. Koenigsberger	Cornell University	States General of the Netherlands in the 15th and 16th centuries		
Humanities	German and East European History	Gerhard L. Weinberg	University of Michigan			
Humanities	German and Scandinavian Literature	Martin Bircher	McGill University			
Humanities	German and Scandinavian Literature	Ernst F. Hoffmann	Hunter College, CUNY			
Humanities	German and Scandinavian Literature	Wolfgang Leppmann	University of Oregon		Also won in 1962	
Humanities	German and Scandinavian Literature	Ralph Manheim				
Humanities	German and Scandinavian Literature	Jeffrey L. Sammons	Yale University	Literary sociology		
Humanities	History of Science and Technology	Stillman Drake	University of Toronto		Also won in 1976	
Humanities	History of Science and Technology	Nathan Sivin	Massachusetts Institute of Technology			
Humanities	History of Science and Technology	Arnold W. Thackray	University of Pennsylvania		Also won in 1985	
Humanities	Italian Literature	Mark Musa	Indiana University			
Humanities	Latin American Literature	Jaime Alazraki	University of California, San Diego	Structure and style in the short stories of Julio Cortazar	Also won in 1982	
Humanities	Linguistics	Noam Chomsky	Massachusetts Institute of Technology	Syntax and semantics		
Humanities	Linguistics	Bernard Spolsky	University of New Mexico	Relationship of language and education		
Humanities	Literary Criticism	Richard A. Blessing	University of Washington			
Humanities	Literary Criticism	Robert Gorham Davis	Columbia University			
Humanities	Literary Criticism	Isabel Gamble MacCaffrey	Tufts University	Spenser's Allegory: The Anatomy of Imagination (published 1976)		
Humanities	Literary Criticism	Martin Price	Yale University	Changing conceptions of character in the novel	Also won in 1957	
Humanities	Medieval History	Angeliki Laiou	Harvard University		Also won in 1978	
Humanities	Medieval Literature	John Freccero	Yale University	Dante's allegory		
Humanities	Medieval Literature	Henry A. Kelly	University of California, Los Angeles	Research in Chelsea, London		
Humanities	Medieval Literature	Lars Lönnroth	University of California, Berkeley	Njáls saga		
Humanities	Music Research	Philip Gossett	University of Chicago			
Humanities	Music Research	R. M. Longyear	University of Kentucky	Musical Romanticism		
Humanities	Music Research	Leon Plantinga	Yale University	Music of Muzio Clementi		
Humanities	Near Eastern Studies	James T. Monroe	University of California, Berkeley	Poetry of Arab Spain from the 10th to the 15th centuries		
Humanities	Philosophy	Mario A. Bunge	McGill University			
Humanities	Philosophy	Karsten Harries	Yale University	Bavarian rococo church		
Humanities	Philosophy	Alvin C. Plantinga	Calvin College	Writing his fourth philosophy book		
Humanities	Philosophy	Giorgio Tonelli	SUNY Binghamton	Historical background of Immanuel Kant's philosophy		
Humanities	Religion	Van A. Harvey	University of Pennsylvania		Also won in 1966	
Humanities	Religion	Charles H. Long	University of Chicago Divinity School			
Humanities	Religion	Malcolm L. Peel	Coe College	Translation and interpretation of ancient writings discovered near Nag Hammadi		
Humanities	Russian History	Vartan Gregorian	University of Texas, Austin	National culture in Soviet Armenia, 1920-1970		
Humanities	Russian History	Reginald Ely Zelnik	University of California, Berkeley	Labor and society in Tsarist Russia, 1871-1891		
Humanities	Science Writing	Hardy M. Edwards, Jr.	University of Georgia	Nutrition and endocrine function		
Humanities	Spanish and Portuguese Literature	Samuel Gordon Armistead	University of Pennsylvania		Also won in 1966	
Humanities	Spanish and Portuguese Literature	Edmund de Chasca	University of Iowa			
Humanities	Spanish and Portuguese Literature	Rafael Pérez de la Dehesa	University of California, Berkeley	Origins of the Generation of 1898		
Humanities	Spanish and Portuguese Literature	Antonio Regalado	Columbia University			
Humanities	Spanish and Portuguese Literature	Emma Speratti-Piñero	Wheaton College			
Humanities	Theatre Arts	George C. Izenour	Yale University	History of theater design		
Humanities	Theatre Arts	Arthur H. Saxon	University of Connecticut	Biography of Andrew Ducrow	Also won in 1982	
Humanities	United States History	Stephen Foster	Northern Illinois University	Origins of congregational polity in England and America, 1620-1649		
Humanities	United States History	John R. Howe	University of Minnesota			
Humanities	United States History	Nathan I. Huggins	Columbia University			
Humanities	United States History	Alfred F. Hurley	US Air Force Academy	Institutional history of the US Air Force		
Humanities	United States History	Stanley I. Kutler	University of Wisconsin, Madison	John Marshall's judicial career		
Humanities	United States History	August Meier	Kent State University	History of the Congress of Racial Equality (CORE) (with Elliott M. Rudwick)		
Humanities	United States History	Stephen B. Oates	University of Massachusetts Amherst	Biography of Abraham Lincoln		
Humanities	United States History	Earl S. Pomeroy	University of Oregon		Also won in 1956	
Humanities	United States History	Richard A. Preston	Duke University	Military history of Canadian-American relations, 1867-1917		
Humanities	United States History	Elliott M. Rudwick	Kent State University	History of the Congress of Racial Equality (CORE) (with August Meier)		
Humanities	United States History	William Stanton	University of Pittsburgh	Intellectual history of the United States, 1815-1848		
Natural Sciences	Applied Mathematics	C. K. Chu	Columbia University			
Natural Sciences	Applied Mathematics	Stanford S. Penner	University of California, San Diego	Spectroscopy; theory of reactive flows		
Natural Sciences	Applied Mathematics	Steven E. Schwarz	University of California, Berkeley	Quantum electronics		
Natural Sciences	Applied Mathematics	Peter J. Wangersky	Dalhousie University			
Natural Sciences	Applied Mathematics	Norman J. Zabusky	Bell Telephone Laboratories	Computational fluid physics		
Natural Sciences	Astronomy and Astrophysics	Donald E. Gault	Ames Research Center	Impacts made by micro-particles on a simulated lunar surface		
Natural Sciences	Astronomy and Astrophysics	John A. Simpson	University of Chicago		Also won in 1984	
Natural Sciences	Chemistry	Paul D. Bartlett	Harvard University		Also won in 1955	
Natural Sciences	Chemistry	Paul Delahay	New York University		Also won in 1955	
Natural Sciences	Chemistry	Leon M. Dorfman	Ohio State University	Research at the Royal Institution of Great Britain		
Natural Sciences	Chemistry	Saul T. Epstein	University of Wisconsin, Madison	Quantum chemistry		
Natural Sciences	Chemistry	Willis H. Flygare	University of Illinois	Structure of liquids	Also won in 1978	
Natural Sciences	Chemistry	Robin M. Hochstrasser	University of Pennsylvania			
Natural Sciences	Chemistry	Stephen J. Lippard	Columbia University			
Natural Sciences	Chemistry	Fred W. McLafferty	Cornell University	Techniques of mass spectrometry in organic chemistry, biochemistry and photochemistry		
Natural Sciences	Chemistry	Norbert T. Porile	Purdue University	High energy chemistry		
Natural Sciences	Chemistry	G. Wilse Robinson	California Institute of Technology	Photobiology		
Natural Sciences	Chemistry	Glen A. Russell	Iowa State University	Free radical chemistry		
Natural Sciences	Chemistry	Marvin J. Stern	Yeshiva University	Isotopes		
Natural Sciences	Chemistry	Ulrich P. Strauss	Rutgers University	Physical chemistry of polyelectrolytes		
Natural Sciences	Chemistry	Richard L. Wolfgang	Yale University	Chemical kinetics	Also won in 1962	
Natural Sciences	Computer Science	King-Sun Fu	Purdue University	New approach to pattern recognition through stochastic languages, considering such factors as noise and distortion		
Natural Sciences	Computer Science	Aravind Joshi	University of Pennsylvania			
Natural Sciences	Computer Science	Pravin Varaiya	University of California, Berkeley	Optimal decisions in large systems		
Natural Sciences	Earth Science	James R. Arnold	University of California, San Diego	Pure and applied geochemistry		
Natural Sciences	Earth Science	Robert A. Berner	Yale University	Sedimentary geochemistry		
Natural Sciences	Earth Science	Kenneth J. Hsü	ETH Zurich			
Natural Sciences	Earth Science	Arvid M. Johnson	Stanford University			
Natural Sciences	Earth Science	Robert L. Kovach	Stanford University	Man's intervention in geologic processes		
Natural Sciences	Earth Science	Ferren MacIntyre	University of California, Santa Barbara	Philosophical studies of man, nature and technology		
Natural Sciences	Earth Science	Allan R. Robinson	Harvard University			
Natural Sciences	Earth Science	John T. Wasson	University of California, Los Angeles			
Natural Sciences	Engineering	Rutherford Aris	University of Minnesota			
Natural Sciences	Engineering	Charles A. Eckert	University of Illinois	Chemical kinetics		
Natural Sciences	Engineering	Gareth Thomas	University of California, Berkeley	High voltage electron microscopy		
Natural Sciences	Mathematics	Lars V. Ahlfors	Harvard University			
Natural Sciences	Mathematics	Louis Auslander	CUNY Graduate Center	Research at the Institute for Advanced Studies		
Natural Sciences	Mathematics	Patrick Billingsley	University of Chicago	Research at University of Cambridge		
Natural Sciences	Mathematics	Rafael V. Chacon	University of Minnesota			
Natural Sciences	Mathematics	Hubert Halkin	University of California, San Diego	Optimization theory		
Natural Sciences	Mathematics	Heisuke Hironaka	Harvard University			
Natural Sciences	Mathematics	Peter E. Ney	University of Wisconsin, Madison	Mathematical analysis of complex biological models		
Natural Sciences	Mathematics	Murray Rosenblatt	University of California, San Diego	Mathematical statistics and probability theory	Also won in 1965	
Natural Sciences	Mathematics	Walter A. Strauss	Brown University			
Natural Sciences	Medicine and Health	Raul E. Falicov	University of Chicago			
Natural Sciences	Medicine and Health	Alexander Leaf	Massachusetts General Hospital; Harvard Medical School			
Natural Sciences	Medicine and Health	Kenneth L. Melmon	University of California Medical Center			
Natural Sciences	Medicine and Health	David A. Prince	Stanford University School of Medicine	Abnormalities of single nerve cells in epilepsy		
Natural Sciences	Medicine and Health	Paul G. Quie	University of Minnesota Medical School			
Natural Sciences	Medicine and Health	Leon E. Rosenberg	Yale University School of Medicine	Biochemical genetics		
Natural Sciences	Medicine and Health	Robert Silber	New York University School of Medicine			
Natural Sciences	Medicine and Health	Bruce A. D. Stocker	Stanford University		Also won in 1981	
Natural Sciences	Molecular and Cellular Biology	Elijah Adams	University of Maryland School of Medicine	Synthesis of peptides		
Natural Sciences	Molecular and Cellular Biology	W. Lane Barksdale	New York University School of Medicine			
Natural Sciences	Molecular and Cellular Biology	Harold J. Bright	University of Pennsylvania			
Natural Sciences	Molecular and Cellular Biology	Ellis Englesberg	University of California, Santa Barbara	Mammalian cell genetics		
Natural Sciences	Molecular and Cellular Biology	Irving I. Geschwind	University of California, Davis	Research at National Institute for Medical Research		
Natural Sciences	Molecular and Cellular Biology	Jerry L. Hedrick	University of California, Davis	Biochemistry of fertilization		
Natural Sciences	Molecular and Cellular Biology	Frans F. Jöbsis	Duke University	Cellular physiology		
Natural Sciences	Molecular and Cellular Biology	Jack F. Kirsch	University of California, Berkeley	Enzyme reaction mechanisms		
Natural Sciences	Molecular and Cellular Biology	Daniel E. Koshland Jr.	University of California, Berkeley	Mechanisms of enzyme action		
Natural Sciences	Molecular and Cellular Biology	Leonard S. Lerman	Vanderbilt University			
Natural Sciences	Molecular and Cellular Biology	David E. Metzler	Iowa State University	Chemistry of metabolism		
Natural Sciences	Molecular and Cellular Biology	David R. Morris	University of Washington			
Natural Sciences	Molecular and Cellular Biology	Leslie A. Orgel	Salk Institute for Biological Studies	Theory of aging		
Natural Sciences	Molecular and Cellular Biology	Irwin A. Rose	University of Pennsylvania			
Natural Sciences	Molecular and Cellular Biology	George Streisinger	University of Oregon			
Natural Sciences	Molecular and Cellular Biology	Noboru Sueoka	Princeton University			
Natural Sciences	Molecular and Cellular Biology	Robert Harold Wasserman	New York State College of Veterinary Medicine at Cornell University	Calcium physiology	Also won in 1964	
Natural Sciences	Neuroscience	Abraham Spector	Columbia University College of Physicians and Surgeons	Protein synthesis in bacterial systems		
Natural Sciences	Organismic Biology and Ecology	John Tyler Bonner	Princeton University		Also won in 1957	
Natural Sciences	Organismic Biology and Ecology	Paul A. Colinvaux	Ohio State University			
Natural Sciences	Organismic Biology and Ecology	Joseph H. Connell	University of California, Santa Barbara	Experimental studies in population ecology	Also won in 1962	
Natural Sciences	Organismic Biology and Ecology	William M. Hamner III	University of California, Davis			
Natural Sciences	Organismic Biology and Ecology	Arnold G. Kluge	University of Michigan	Research in Australia		
Natural Sciences	Organismic Biology and Ecology	Michael Menaker	University of Texas, Austin	Research at the University of Montpellier		
Natural Sciences	Organismic Biology and Ecology	George B. Schaller	New York Zoological Society; Rockefeller University			
Natural Sciences	Physics	Joseph Ballam	Stanford University			
Natural Sciences	Physics	Vernon D. Barger	University of Wisconsin, Madison	Theoretical studies in high energy physics		
Natural Sciences	Physics	Boris W. Batterman	Cornell University	Solid-state physics		
Natural Sciences	Physics	David O. Caldwell	University of California, Santa Barbara	Elementary particle physics		
Natural Sciences	Physics	Geoffrey V. Chester	Cornell University	Low-temperature physics		
Natural Sciences	Physics	Benjamin D. Day	Argonne National Laboratory	Research at the Niels Bohr Institute		
Natural Sciences	Physics	Sidney David Drell	Stanford Linear Accelerator Center		Also won in 1961	
Natural Sciences	Physics	Thomas Ferbel	University of Rochester	Research at Fermilab		
Natural Sciences	Physics	Norman C. Ford	University of Massachusetts, Amherst	Characteristics of large molecules such as those that make up living tissue		
Natural Sciences	Physics	Steven Frautschi	California Institute of Technology	High-energy particle physics		
Natural Sciences	Physics	Murray Gell-Mann	California Institute of Technology	Elementary particle physics		
Natural Sciences	Physics	Lee Grodzins	Massachusetts Institute of Technology		Also won in 1964	
Natural Sciences	Physics	Frank S. Ham	General Electric			
Natural Sciences	Physics	David Lowery Hendrie	Lawrence Radiation Laboratory	Experimental studies in high-energy nuclear physics		
Natural Sciences	Physics	Kenneth A. Johnson	Massachusetts Institute of Technology	Research at the Stanford Linear Accelerator Center		
Natural Sciences	Physics	Gordon L. Kane	University of Michigan			
Natural Sciences	Physics	David Litster	Massachusetts Institute of Technology			
Natural Sciences	Physics	Richard Marrus	University of California, Berkeley	Quantum electrodynamics		
Natural Sciences	Physics	George E. Masek	University of California, San Diego	High-energy physics		
Natural Sciences	Physics	Paul C. Martin	Harvard University		Also won in 1965	
Natural Sciences	Physics	Carl E. McIlwain	University of California, San Diego	Plasma phenomena in the magnetosphere	Also won in 1967	
Natural Sciences	Physics	Yoichiro Nambu	University of Chicago		Also won in 1977	
Natural Sciences	Physics	Lee G. Pondrom	University of Wisconsin, Madison	High-energy physics		
Natural Sciences	Physics	Robert V. Pound	Harvard University		Also won in 1957	
Natural Sciences	Physics	Walter Selove	University of Pennsylvania			
Natural Sciences	Physics	Richard E. Taylor	Stanford Linear Accelerator Center	Research at CERN		
Natural Sciences	Plant Science	Norman I. Bishop	Oregon State University			
Natural Sciences	Plant Science	Norman E. Good	Michigan State University	Bioenergetics of ion movements in photosynthetic systems		
Natural Sciences	Plant Science	Subodh K. Jain	University of California, Davis			
Natural Sciences	Plant Science	Tom J. Mabry	University of Texas, Austin	Metabolic role in plant development		
Social Sciences	Anthropology and Cultural Studies	Gerald Berreman	University of California, Berkeley	Urban social interaction in India		
Social Sciences	Anthropology and Cultural Studies	William Oliver Bright	University of California, Los Angeles			
Social Sciences	Anthropology and Cultural Studies	Robbins Burling	University of Michigan	Research in Toulouse		
Social Sciences	Anthropology and Cultural Studies	J. Desmond Clark	University of California, Berkeley	African paleolithic archaeology		
Social Sciences	Anthropology and Cultural Studies	Lambros Comitas	Columbia University			
Social Sciences	Anthropology and Cultural Studies	Robert H. Dyson Jr.	University of Pennsylvania			
Social Sciences	Anthropology and Cultural Studies	John J. Gumperz	University of California, Berkeley	Sociolinguistics		
Social Sciences	Anthropology and Cultural Studies	William Hardy McNeill	University of Chicago		Also won in 1985	
Social Sciences	Anthropology and Cultural Studies	John Middleton	New York University			
Social Sciences	Anthropology and Cultural Studies	Peter J. Powell	St. Augustine's Center for American Indians			
Social Sciences	Anthropology and Cultural Studies	Elliott P. Skinner	Columbia University			
Social Sciences	Economics	Alfred S. Eichner	Columbia University			
Social Sciences	Economics	Gerald K. Helleiner	University of Toronto			
Social Sciences	Economics	Charles E. Lindblom	Yale University	Comparative study of politico-economic systems	Also won in 1950, 1985	
Social Sciences	Economics	Robert A. Mundell	University of Chicago			
Social Sciences	Economics	John W. Pratt	Harvard University	Research in Kyoto		
Social Sciences	Education	Charles E. Bidwell	University of Chicago			
Social Sciences	Education	Lee J. Cronbach	Stanford University	Interactions of psychological measurements and social policy		
Social Sciences	Education	Joseph J. Schwab	University of Chicago			
Social Sciences	Geography and Environmental Studies	Peter O. Wacker	Rutgers University	Historical-cultural geography of New Jersey before 1800		
Social Sciences	Law	Francis A. Allen	University of Michigan	Concept of political crime	Also won in 1977	
Social Sciences	Law	Jerome A. Cohen	Harvard Law School	Research in Kyoto		
Social Sciences	Law	Melvin A. Eisenberg	University of California, Berkeley	Modern corporate decision-making		
Social Sciences	Law	Charles Fried	Harvard University Law School			
Social Sciences	Law	Grant Gilmore	University of Chicago			
Social Sciences	Law	Herbert L. Packer	Stanford University			
Social Sciences	Law	Ralph K. Winter	Yale University	Labor law, economic policy, and poverty programs		
Social Sciences	Political Science	Gar Alperovitz	University of Cambridge			
Social Sciences	Political Science	Karl W. Deutsch	Harvard University	Formulation of a general theory of politics	Also won in 1954	
Social Sciences	Political Science	George Kateb	Amherst College	Study of the radical critique of liberal democracy		
Social Sciences	Political Science	Everett Carll Ladd Jr.	University of Connecticut	Political responses to social change in the American experience		
Social Sciences	Political Science	Joseph LaPalombara	Yale University	Role of public bureaucracies in effecting political and social change		
Social Sciences	Political Science	Hanna Pitkin	University of California, Berkeley	Nature of self and its significance for politics		
Social Sciences	Political Science	Hanes Walton	Savannah State College			
Social Sciences	Political Science	Neal Wood	York University, Toronto			
Social Sciences	Psychology	Eugene Burnstein	University of Michigan			
Social Sciences	Psychology	Emilia Ferreiro	University of the Republic	Comparative developmental psycholinguistics		
Social Sciences	Psychology	George Mandler	University of California, San Diego	Cognitive psychology		
Social Sciences	Psychology	David H. Raab	Brooklyn College			
Social Sciences	Psychology	Leo Rangell	University of California, Los Angeles			
Social Sciences	Psychology	Roger Newland Shepard	Stanford University			
Social Sciences	Psychology	Patrick Suppes	Stanford University			
Social Sciences	Psychology	David Garrett Winter	Wesleyan University	Psychology of power		
Social Sciences	Sociology	Norman Birnbaum	Amherst College	Marxist legacy in sociology		
Social Sciences	Sociology	Troy Duster	University of California, Berkeley	Colonial analogy and the "black situation" in the United States		
Social Sciences	Sociology	Seymour Martin Lipset	Harvard University	Political role of intellectuals		
Social Sciences	Sociology	Theodore Roszak	California State University, Hayward	The making of a counterculture		
Social Sciences	Sociology	Ezra F. Vogel	Harvard University			

== 1971 Latin American and Caribbean Fellows ==
Category	Field of Study	Fellow	Institutional association	Research topic	Notes	Ref
Creative Arts	Fiction	Max Aub	Universidad Nacional Autónoma de México	Life and times of Luis Buñuel	Also won in 1966, 1968	
Creative Arts	Fiction	Daniel Moyano		Writing		
Creative Arts	Film	Jorge R. Preloran	Harvard University	Filmmaking in Argentina	Also won in 1975	
Creative Arts	Fine Arts	Antonio Dias		Painting		
Creative Arts	Fine Arts	Juan Downey	Pratt Institute	Sculpture	Also won in 1976	
Creative Arts	Fine Arts	Fernando Maza		Painting		
Creative Arts	Fine Arts	Alejandro Otero		Sculpture		
Creative Arts	Music Composition	Carlos R. Alsina		Composing		
Creative Arts	Poetry	Edward Kamau Brathwaite	University of the West Indies	Writing		
Creative Arts	Poetry	Marco Antonio Montes de Oca	Universidad Nacional Autónoma de México	Writing	Also won in 1967	
Humanities	Architecture, Planning and Design	Armando D. Mendes	Universidade Federal do Pará	River-basin planning in the Amazon region		
Humanities	Fine Arts Research	Jorge Elliott	Universidad de Chile	Creation of visual images in art and literature		
Humanities	Iberian and Latin American History	Jorge Arias de Greiff	National University of Colombia	History of the development of astronomy in Colombia		
Humanities	Latin American Literature	Fernando Ainsa	El Diario	The Latin American novel		
Humanities	Literary Criticism	Haroldo de Campos		Development of the Brazilian contemporary novel		
Humanities	Music Research	Fernando von Reichenbach	Torcuato di Tella Institute	Computer-based experiments on sound synthesis from graphs		
Humanities	Philosophy	José Rafael Echeverría	Universidad de Puerto Rico	Concept of general studies		
Natural Sciences	Earth Science	Rafael Herbst	National University of the Northeast	Triassic flora		
Natural Sciences	Molecular and Cellular Biology	Jorge E. Allende	University of Chile	Regulation of protein synthesis in plant cells	Also won in 1966	
Natural Sciences	Molecular and Cellular Biology	Ernesto G. Bade	Campomar Institute of Research in Biochemistry	Control mechanisms of protein biosynthesis	Also won in 1970	
Natural Sciences	Molecular and Cellular Biology	Jorge Cerbón Solórzano	Instituto Politécnico Nacional	Spectroscopic studies of membrane phenomena		
Natural Sciences	Molecular and Cellular Biology	Luiz R. Travassos	University of Buenos Aires	16th-century chroniclers of Spanish America		
Natural Sciences	Organismic Biology and Ecology	Alejo Mesa	University of the Republic	Cytological studies of Antarctic cricket-like insects		
Natural Sciences	Physics	Roberto L. Lobo e Silva	University of São Paulo	Solid state physics		
Natural Sciences	Physics	Carlos Alberto Luengo	Bariloche Atomic Centre	Low-temperature solid state physics		
Natural Sciences	Plant Science	Margaret U. Mee		Illustrated book of Amazonian plants		
Social Sciences	Anthropology and Cultural Studies	Miguel Chase-Sardi	Universidad Católica "Nuestra Señora de la Asunción"	Ethnological studies of "Paraguayan Indians"		
Social Sciences	Sociology	Julio Cotler	National University of San Marcos	Contemporary Peru		

== See also ==
- John Simon Guggenheim Memorial Foundation
- List of Guggenheim Fellowships awarded in 1970
- List of Guggenheim Fellowships awarded in 1972
