= Roberto Leal =

Roberto Leal may refer to:

- Roberto Leal Lobo e Silva Filho (born 1938), Brazilian professor
- Roberto Leal Monteiro (born 1946), Home Affairs Minister of Angola
- Roberto Leal (singer) (1951–2019), Portuguese singer
- Roberto Leal (TV presenter) (born 1979), Spanish TV presenter
