= Robert Wasserman =

Robert Wasserman may refer to:

- Lew Wasserman (Lewis Robert Wasserman, 1913–2002), American talent agent and manager
- Bob Wasserman (1934–2011), American politician and police chief
- Rob Wasserman (1952–2016), American musician
- Robert Harold Wasserman (1926–2018), professor of veterinary medicine
