= John Hightower (museum director) =

American museum director (1933–2013)

John Brantley Hightower (May 23, 1933 – July 6, 2013) was a director of the Museum of Modern Art, the South Street Seaport Museum, and the Mariners' Museum.

== Biography ==
Hightower was born in Atlanta, Georgia, and moved with his family to New York City, New York, when he was one year old. He attended the Northfield Mount Hermon School, a private boarding school in Massachusetts. He graduated Yale University in 1955. He served two years in the Marines after graduation. From 1957 to 1961, he was in an executive training program at First National City Bank. In 1961, he became an assistant to the president and publisher of American Heritage Publishing Company.

From 1964 to 1970, he was executive director of the New York State Council on the Arts, where his budget went from $500,000 in his first year to $22 million in his last year.

On May 1, 1970, he assumed the position of director of the Museum of Modern Art. Hightower's tenure at the museum was marked by the unionizing of its work force into the Professional and Administrative Staff Association (PASTA) which also went on strike. He resigned from his position on January 5, 1972.

From 1977 to 1993, he was president of the South Street Seaport Museum

From 1993 to 2006, he was president and Director of the Mariners' Museum, a period which included establishing the USS Monitor Center and Conservation Laboratory.

Cultural offices
Preceded by Bates Lowry	Directors of the Museum of Modern Art; 1970–1971	Succeeded by Richard Oldenburg
