= Richard Oldenburg =

Swedish-American museum director (1933–2018)

Richard E. Oldenburg (September 21, 1933 – April 17, 2018) was the director of the Museum of Modern Art from 1972 to 1995.

Oldenburg was born in Stockholm, brother of Pop Art sculptor artist Claes Oldenburg. The family moved to the United States when he was a child, as his father was in the Swedish diplomatic service. His mother, Sigrid Lindforss, was an opera singer in Sweden and an abstract artist.

== Education ==
Oldenburg received a B.A. from Harvard University and attended one year of Harvard Law School before becoming an assistant director of financial aid at Harvard.

== Career ==
=== Early career ===
He served in the United States army from 1956 to 1958. After the military he was a manager at Doubleday and in 1963 he joined Macmillan Company where became managing director of the trade division.

=== Museum of Modern Art ===
In 1969 Oldenburg joined MoMA and was responsible for what MoMA said was the largest publishing program of any museum in the world.

In 1972 he was named acting director of the museum in January following the resignation of John B. Hightower. In June 1972 he was named the official director of the museum. During his tenure, Oldenburg oversaw the $55 million expansion of the museum building to more than double its size, increased both the museum's endowment and its attendance and helped organize several blockbuster exhibitions, including the Matisse retrospective in 1992. Other important shows during Oldenburg's tenure included "Picasso and Braque: Pioneering Cubism" in 1989; "Vienna 1900: Art, Architecture & Design" in 1986; "Primitivism in 20th-Century Art" in 1984; "Pablo Picasso: A Retrospective" in 1980, and "Cezanne: The Late Work" in 1978. Under his direction, the museum attendance grew from 853,996 in 1972 to 1.28 million in 1992.

While at MoMA, Oldenburg served as president of the Association of Art Museum Directors in 1987 and 1988. Referring to then Governor Mario Cuomo's proposal for a cut of 56 percent in the budget for the New York State Council on the Arts in 1991, Oldenburg called it "extremely disproportionate, a sign of the low priority Governor Cuomo puts on arts and cultural programs in general." When he retired in 1995, he became the museum's director emeritus and served as an honorary member of the institution's board of trustees.

=== Sotheby's ===
Oldenburg became Chairman of Sotheby's North and South America operations from 1995 to 2000 and later was named Sotheby's Honorary Chairman. While at Sotheby's, he did not conduct sales but focussed on obtaining works of art for sale and conferring with museums on appraisals, acquisitions and sales. He also advised Sotheby's on its educational programs. However, Time art critic Robert Hughes, commented: "I'm sad he's being sucked into the totally pernicious cultural influence of Sotheby's and the auction system."

He served as president of the Harvard Board of Overseers from 2001 to 2002.

== Death ==
Oldenburg died at the age of 84 at his home in Manhattan due to heart failure. He was survived by his brother and his wife Mary Ellen Meehan. After his death, a selection of pieces from his art collection were sold at auction, including 20th century works by Mimmo Rotella, Roy Lichtenstein, Ellsworth Kelly, and Claes Oldenburg.

== Publications ==
- 1998: Primitivism in 20th Century Art: Affinity of the Tribal and the Modern (2 Volume Set), The Museum of Modern Art, ISBN 9780870705342
- 2002: A Century Of Artists Books, The Museum of Modern Art, ISBN 9780870701511
- 2002: Kandinsky Compositions, The Museum of Modern Art, ISBN 9780870704055
- 2010: How the Quail Earned His Topknot, Strategic Book Publishing & Rights Agency, LLC, ISBN 9781609116682
- 2012: The Musical Dragon: The Dragon That Wanted to Join the Band, Strategic Book Publishing & Rights Agency, LLC, ISBN 9781618973351
- 2012: A Curator's Quest: Building the Museum of Modern Art's Painting and Sculpture Collection, 1967-1988, Harry N. Abrams, ISBN 9781590201176
- 2013: The Three Little Green Pigs, LLC: A Recycling Pig Tale, Strategic Book Publishing & Rights Agency, LLC, ISBN 9781625167538

Cultural offices
Preceded by John B. Hightower	Director of the Museum of Modern Art; 1972-1995	Succeeded by Glenn D. Lowry
