= Leonard Kriegel =

American writer (1933–2022)

Leonard Kriegel (May 25, 1933 – September 25, 2022) was an American author and self-proclaimed "cripple". His writing included essays, stories, and novels. He contracted polio at the age of 11, leaving him confined to steel braces and crutches shortly after. Kriegel recounted his experience with the illness in his memoir, The Long Walk Home, published in 1964. He received both Guggenheim and Rockefeller Fellowships, and three of his books were named New York Times Notable Books of the Year.

== Early life ==
Kriegel was born in the Bronx on May 25, 1933. His father, Fred, worked as a deli counterman; his mother, Sylvia (Breittholz), was a housewife. Kriegel grew up in the neighborhood of Norwood. He caught polio during summer camp in 1944 and consequently remained at the New York State Reconstruction Home in West Haverstraw for two years. After being unsuccessfully treated, he went back to his home borough and finished his secondary school at home with visiting teachers. Kriegel opted not to use a wheelchair – believing that it suggested surrender to his illness – and consequently taught himself how to use braces and crutches to walk. He studied at Hunter College, graduating with a bachelor's degree. He then obtained a master's degree at Columbia University, before being awarded a Doctor of Philosophy from New York University. The subject of his thesis was the writer and critic Edmund Wilson.

== Career ==
Kriegel first taught at Long Island University, before teaching at the City College of New York and becoming director of its Center for Worker Education. He published his first book, The Long Walk Home, in 1964. The memoir bluntly described his experience with polio and his resulting anger, and utilized the term "cripple" at his insistence (a phrase that would be used throughout his later works). He recounted telling his wife how he wanted his work to be "free of the sentimentality and cant and papier-mâché religiosity usually found in such books", at a time when it was uncommon to openly talk about the illness. Richard Shepard described the memoir in The New York Times as "superb craft and keen insight ... written without a trace of false sentimentality or phony revelation". Another reviewer, in the Chicago Tribune, noted that it had "flashes of insight and self-understanding amid sordidness and frequently unnecessary obscene realism".

Kriegel went on to author several other books, including Working Through: A Teacher's Journey in the Urban University (1972), Notes for the Two-Dollar Window: Portraits From an American Neighborhood (1976), On Men and Manhood (1979), and Quitting Time (1982). He also released Flying Solo: Reimagining Manhood, Courage, and Loss, a collection of mostly autobiographical essays, in 1998. He was awarded a Guggenheim Fellowship for general nonfiction in 1971. Four years later, he was conferred a Rockefeller fellowship. Kriegel also received a MacDowell fellowship in 1976, the O. Henry Award, and three of his books were named New York Times Notable Books of the Year.

== Personal life ==
Kriegel was married to Harriet Bernzweig until his death. Together, they had two children.

Kriegel died on September 25, 2022, in Manhattan. He was 89, and suffered from heart failure prior to his death.

== List of works ==
- The Long Walk Home (1964), published by Appleton-Century
- Essential Works of the Founding Fathers (1964, ed.)
- Edmund Wilson (1971) ISBN 9780809305230
- Working Through: A Teacher's Journey in the Urban University (1972) ISBN 9780841501867
- Notes for the Two-Dollar Window (1976) ISBN 9780841504066
- On Men and Manhood (1979) ISBN 9780801502484
- Quitting Time: A Novel (1982) ISBN 9780394508931
- Falling Into Life (1991) ISBN 9780865474581
- Flying Solo (1998) ISBN 9780807072301

== General and cited references ==
- Haugen, Hayley Mitchell (2010). "The 'Disabled Imagination' and the Masculine Metaphor in the Works of Leonard Kriegel". In Klaver, Elizabeth (ed.). The Body in Medical Culture. Albany, NY: State University of New York Press. pp. 89–108. ISBN 9781438425856. OCLC 610904703.
