= Claes Oldenburg =

Swedish-born American sculptor (1929–2022)

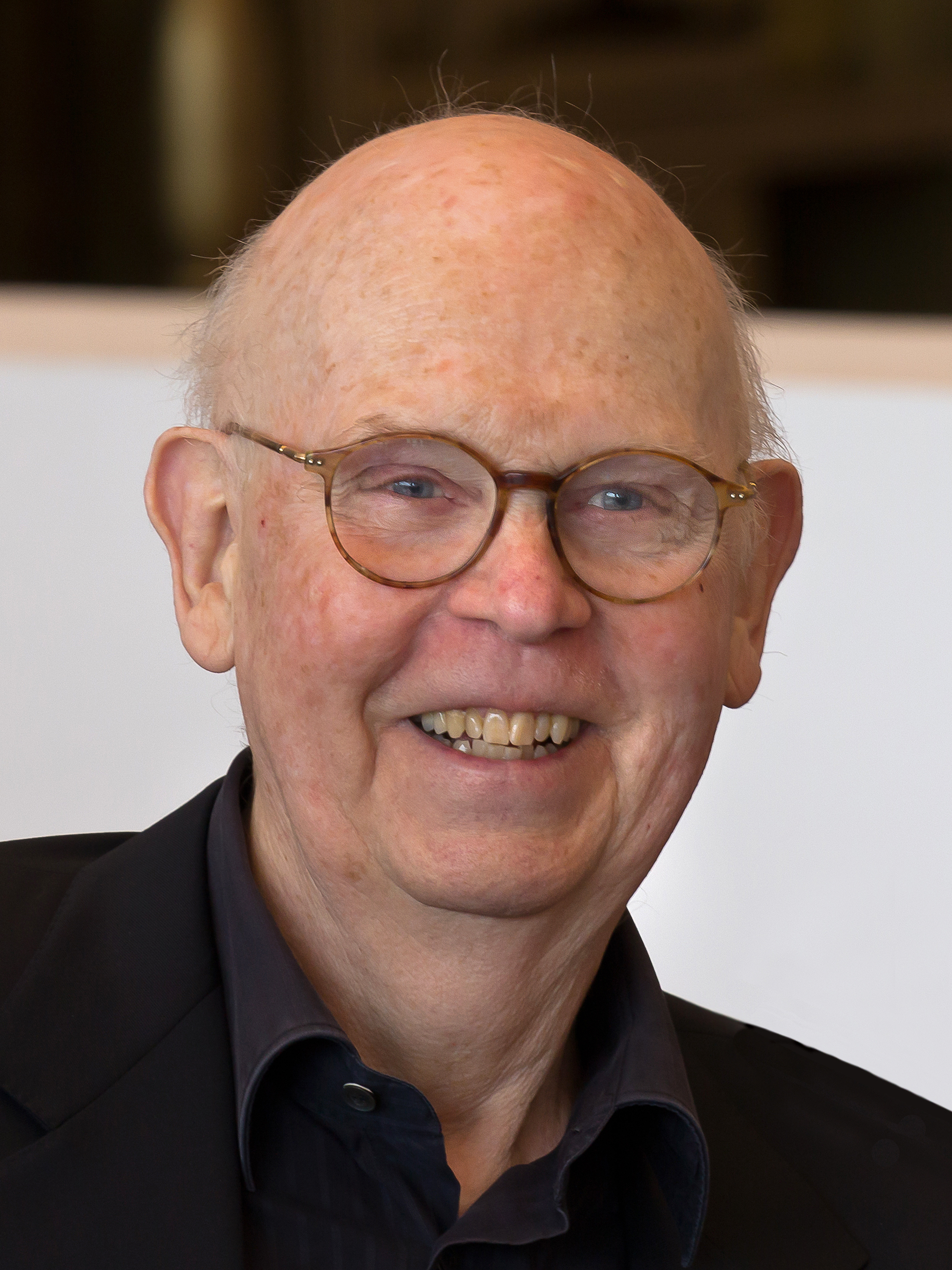
- Oldenburg in 2012
- Born: January 28, 1929; Stockholm, Sweden
- Died: July 18, 2022 (aged 93); New York City, U.S.
- Education: Latin School of Chicago; Art Institute of Chicago; Yale University
- Known for: Sculpture
- Notable work: List of public art by Oldenburg and van Bruggen
- Movement: Pop art; avant-garde
- Spouses: Patty Mucha (m. 1960; div. 1970) Coosje van Bruggen (m. 1977; died 2009)
- Partner: Hannah Wilke (1969–1977)
- Children: 2
- Relatives: Richard Oldenburg (brother)
- Awards: Wolf Prize in Arts – Sculpture 1989; Rolf Schock Prize – Visual arts 1995; National Medal of Arts 2000

Claes Oldenburg (January 28, 1929 – July 18, 2022) was a Swedish-born American sculptor best known for his public art installations, typically featuring large replicas of everyday objects. Another theme in his work is soft sculpture versions of everyday objects. Many of his works were made in collaboration with his wife, Coosje van Bruggen, who died in 2009; they had been married for 32 years. Oldenburg lived and worked in New York City.

== Early life and education ==
Claes Oldenburg was born on January 28, 1929, in Stockholm, the son of Gösta Oldenburg and his wife Sigrid Elisabeth née Lindforss. His father was then a Swedish diplomat stationed in New York and in 1936 was appointed consul general of Sweden to Chicago where Oldenburg grew up, attending the Latin School of Chicago. He studied literature and art history at Yale University from 1946 to 1950, then returned to Chicago where he took classes at The School of the Art Institute of Chicago. While further developing his craft, he worked as a reporter at the City News Bureau of Chicago. He also opened his own studio and, in 1953, became a naturalized citizen of the United States. In 1956, he moved to New York, and for a time worked in the library of the Cooper Union Museum for the Arts of Decoration, where he also took the opportunity to learn more, on his own, about the history of art.

== Work ==
Oldenburg's first recorded sales of artworks were at the 57th Street Art Fair in Chicago, where he sold 5 items for a total price of $25. He moved back to New York City in 1956. There he met a number of artists, including Jim Dine, Red Grooms, and Allan Kaprow, whose happenings incorporated theatrical aspects and provided an alternative to the abstract expressionism that had come to dominate much of the art scene. Oldenburg began toying with the idea of soft sculpture in 1957, when he completed a free-hanging piece made from a woman's stocking stuffed with newspaper. (The piece was untitled when he made it but is now referred to as Sausage.)

By 1960, Oldenburg had produced sculptures containing simply rendered figures, letters, and signs, inspired by the Lower East Side neighborhood where he lived, made out of materials such as cardboard, burlap, and newspapers; in 1961, he shifted his method, creating sculptures from chicken wire covered with plaster-soaked canvas and enamel paint, depicting everyday objects – articles of clothing and food items. Oldenburg's first show which included three-dimensional works, in May 1959, was at the Judson Gallery, at Judson Memorial Church on Washington Square. During this time, artist Robert Beauchamp described Oldenburg as "brilliant", due to the reaction that the pop artist brought to a "dull" abstract expressionist period.

In the 1960s, Oldenburg became associated with the pop art movement and created many so-called happenings, which were performance art related productions of that time. The name he gave to his own productions was "Ray Gun Theater". The cast of colleagues who appeared in his performances included artists Lucas Samaras, Tom Wesselmann, Carolee Schneemann, Oyvind Fahlstrom and Richard Artschwager, art gallerist Annina Nosei, critic Barbara Rose, and screenwriter Rudy Wurlitzer. His first wife (1960–1970) Patty Mucha (Patricia Muchinski), who sewed many of his early soft sculptures, was a constant performer in his happenings. His brash, often humorous, approach to art was at great odds with the prevailing sensibility that, by its nature, dealt with "profound" expressions or ideas. But Oldenburg's spirited art found first a niche then a great popularity that endures to this day. In December 1961, he rented a store on Manhattan's Lower East Side to house "The Store", a month-long installation he had first presented at the Martha Jackson Gallery in New York, stocked with sculptures in the form of consumer goods.

Oldenburg moved to Los Angeles in 1963 "because it was the most opposite thing to New York [he] could think of". That same year, he conceived AUT OBO DYS, performed in the parking lot of the American Institute of Aeronautics and Astronautics in December 1963. In 1965, he turned his attention to drawings and projects for imaginary outdoor monuments. Initially these monuments took the form of small collages such as a crayon image of a fat, fuzzy teddy bear looming over the grassy fields of New York's Central Park (1965) and Lipsticks in Piccadilly Circus, London (1966). In 1967, New York city cultural adviser Sam Green realized Oldenburg's first outdoor public monument; Placid Civic Monument took the form of a Conceptual performance/action behind the Metropolitan Museum of Art in New York City, with a crew of gravediggers digging a 6-by-3-foot rectangular hole in the ground. In 1969, Oldenberg contributed a drawing to the Moon Museum. Geometric Mouse-Scale A, Black 1/6, also from 1969, was selected to be part of the Governor Nelson A. Rockefeller Empire State Plaza Art Collection in Albany, New York.

Many of Oldenburg's large-scale sculptures of mundane objects elicited ridicule before being accepted. For example, the 1969 Lipstick (Ascending) on Caterpillar Tracks, was removed from its original place in Beinecke Plaza at Yale University, and "circulated on a loan basis to other campuses". English art critic Ellen H. Johnson says that with its "bright color, contemporary form and material and its ignoble subject, it attacked the sterility and pretentiousness of the classicistic building behind it". The artist "pointed out it opposed levity to solemnity, color to colorlessness, metal to stone, simple to a sophisticated tradition. In theme, it is both phallic, life-engendering, and a bomb, the harbinger of death. Male in form, it is female in subject". One of a number of Oldenburg's sculptures that possess interactive capabilities, it now resides in the Morse College courtyard.

From the early 1970s on, Oldenburg concentrated almost exclusively on public commissions. His first public work, Three-Way Plug came on commission from Oberlin College with a grant from the National Endowment for the Arts. His collaboration with Dutch/American writer and art historian Coosje van Bruggen dates from 1976. They were married in 1977, and continued to work collaboratively for 30 years, developing over 40 public pieces, which they called ‘large-scale projects’. Oldenburg officially signed all the work he did from 1981 on with both his own name and van Bruggen's. Their first collaboration came when Oldenburg was commissioned to rework Trowel I, a 1971 sculpture of an oversize garden tool, for the grounds of the Kröller-Müller Museum in Otterlo in the Netherlands.

In 1988, the two created the iconic Spoonbridge and Cherry sculpture for the Walker Art Center in Minneapolis. It remains a staple of the Minneapolis Sculpture Garden as well as a classic image of the city. Typewriter Eraser, Scale X (1999) is in the National Gallery of Art Sculpture Garden. Another well known construction by the duo is the Free Stamp in downtown Cleveland.

In addition to freestanding projects, they occasionally contributed to architectural projects, among them, two Los Angeles projects in collaboration with architect Frank Gehry: Toppling Ladder With Spilling Paint, which was installed at Loyola Law School in 1986, and the building-mounted sculpture Giant Binoculars, completed in Venice Beach in 1991. The couple's collaboration with Gehry also involved a return to performance for Oldenburg when the trio presented Il Corso del Coltello, in Venice, Italy, in 1985; other characters were portrayed by Germano Celant and Pontus Hultén. "Coltello" is the source of Knife Ship, a large-scale sculpture that served as the central prop; it was later seen in Los Angeles in 1988 when Oldenburg, van Bruggen and Gehry presented Coltello Recalled: Reflections on a Performance at the Japanese American Cultural & Community Center and the exhibition Props, Costumes and Designs for the Performance "Il Corso del Coltello" at Margo Leavin Gallery. He collaborated with English director Gerald Fox in 1996 to make a documentary about himself in association with The South Bank Show which was broadcast on ITV.

The city of Milan, Italy, commissioned the work known as Needle, Thread and Knot (Italian: Ago, filo e nodo) which was installed in 2000 in the Piazzale Cadorna. In 2001, Oldenburg and van Bruggen created Dropped Cone, a huge inverted ice cream cone, on top of a shopping center in Cologne, Germany. Installed at the Pennsylvania Academy of the Fine Arts in 2011, Paint Torch is a towering 53-foot-high (16 m) pop sculpture of a paintbrush, capped with bristles that are illuminated at night. The sculpture is installed at a daring 60-degree angle, as if in the act of painting. In 2018, The Maze was included in 1968: Sparta Dreaming Athens at Château de Montsoreau-Museum of Contemporary Art.

== Exhibitions ==
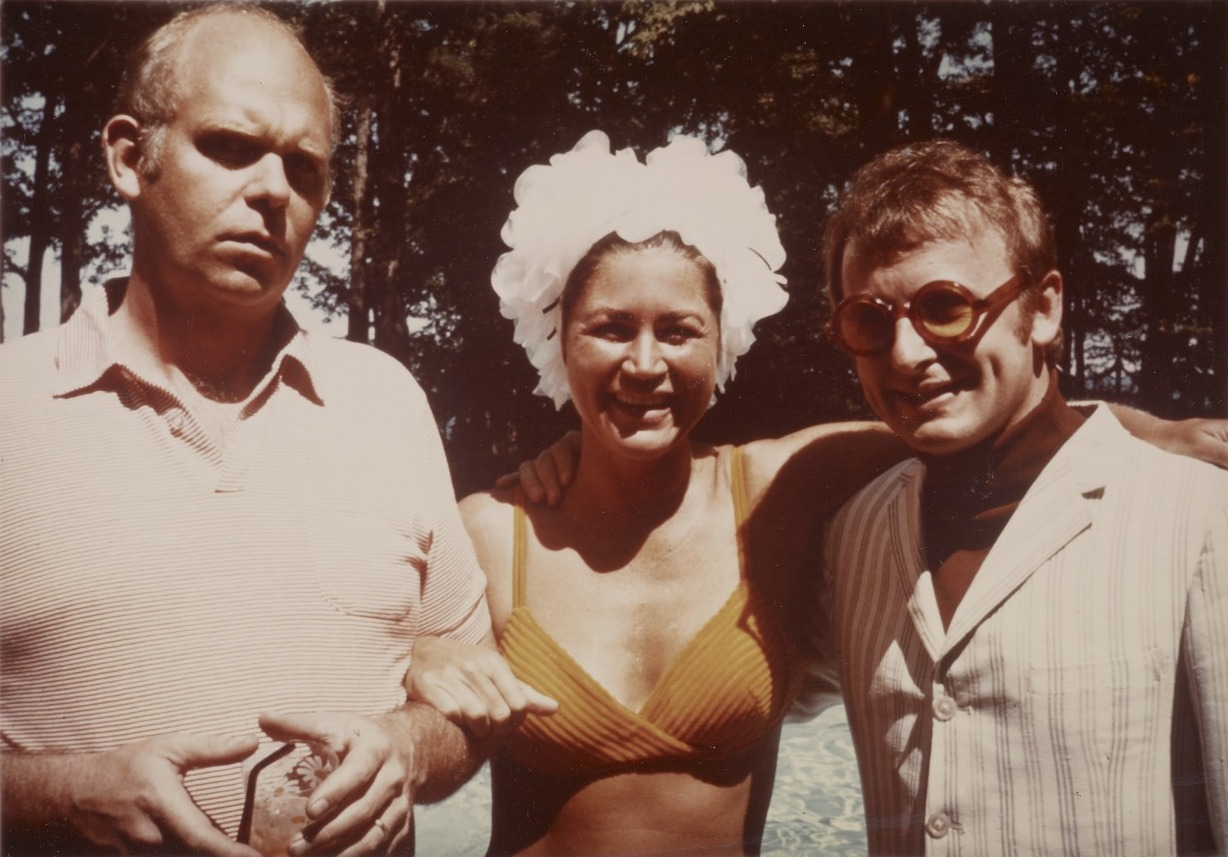
Artists Claes Oldenburg and Fay Peck with museum director Jan van der Marck in 1968

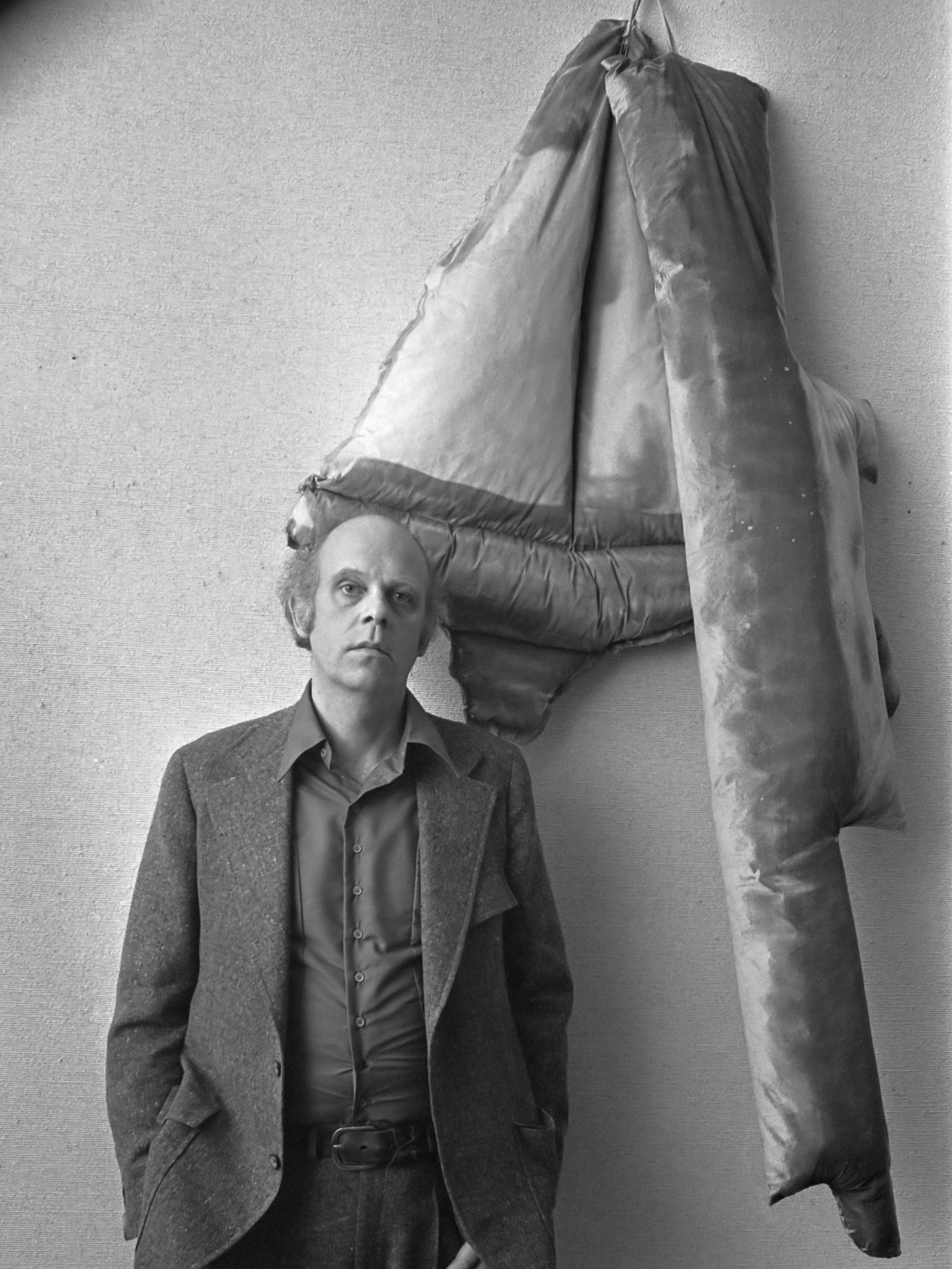
Oldenburg in Stedelijk Museum Amsterdam, 1970

Oldenburg's first one-man show, in 1959 at the Judson Gallery in New York, had shown figurative drawings and papier-mâché sculptures. He was honored with a solo exhibition of his work at the Moderna Museet (organized by Pontus Hultén), in 1966; the Museum of Modern Art, New York, in 1969; London's Tate Gallery in 1970 (chronicled in a 1970 twin-projection documentary by James Scott called The Great Ice Cream Robbery); and with a retrospective organized by Germano Celant at the Solomon R. Guggenheim Museum, New York, in 1995 (travelling to the National Gallery of Art, Washington, D.C.; Museum of Contemporary Art, Los Angeles; Kunst- und Ausstellungshalle der Bundesrepublik Deutschland, Bonn; and Hayward Gallery, London). In 2002, the Whitney Museum of American Art in New York held a retrospective of the drawings of Oldenburg and van Bruggen; the same year, the Metropolitan Museum of Art in New York exhibited a selection of their sculptures on the roof of the museum.

Oldenburg is represented by the Pace Gallery in New York and Margo Leavin Gallery in Los Angeles.

== Recognition ==
Oldenburg received honorary degrees from Oberlin College, Ohio, in 1970; Art Institute of Chicago, Illinois, in 1979; Bard College, New York, in 1995; and Royal College of Art, London, in 1996.

Honors awarded to Oldenburg included:

- Brandeis University Sculpture Award, 1971
- Skowhegan Medal for Sculpture, 1972
- Art Institute of Chicago, First Prize Sculpture Award, 72nd American Exhibition, 1976
- Medal, American Institute of Architects, 1977
- Wilhelm-Lehmbruck Prize for Sculpture, Duisburg, Germany, 1981
- Brandeis University Creative Arts Award for Lifetime Artistic Achievement, The Jack I. and Lillian Poses Medal for Sculpture, 1993
- Wolf Prize in Arts, 1989
- Rolf Schock Foundation Prize, Stockholm, Sweden, 1995
- National Medal of Arts, 2000

Oldenburg was a member of the American Academy and Institute of Arts and Letters from 1975 on and the American Academy of Arts and Sciences from 1978.

=== Together with Coosje van Bruggen ===
Oldenburg and Coosje van Bruggen together received honorary degrees from the California College of the Arts, San Francisco, California, in 1996; University of Teesside, Middlesbrough, England, in 1999; Nova Scotia College of Art and Design, Halifax, Nova Scotia, in 2005; the College for Creative Studies in Detroit, Michigan, in 2005, and the Pennsylvania Academy of Fine Arts, 2011. Awards for their collaboration include the Distinction in Sculpture, SculptureCenter, New York (1994); Nathaniel S. Saltonstall Award, Institute of Contemporary Art, Boston (1996); Partners in Education Award, Solomon R. Guggenheim Museum, New York (2002); and Medal Award, School of the Museum of Fine Arts, Boston (2004).

=== Depictions in media ===
In her 16-minute, 16mm film Manhattan Mouse Museum (2011), artist Tacita Dean captured Oldenburg in his studio as he gently handles and dusts the small objects that line his bookshelves. The film is less about the artist's iconography than the embedded intellectual process which allowed him to transform everyday objects into remarkable sculptural forms.

== Personal life ==
Claes Oldenburg was married to his first wife Patty Mucha from 1960 to 1970, after Mucha moved to New York City in 1957 to become an artist. They met when Oldenburg was painting portraits and Mucha posed as one of his nude models. An Oldenburg drawing of Mucha titled Pat Reading in Bed, Lenox, 1959 is in the collection of the Whitney Museum of American Art. She was a collaborator in Oldenburg's happenings by brainstorming ideas together, making the costumes together, acting as a performer in the piece, having also sewed his famous 'Floor Hamburger', 'Floor Cone', and 'Floor Cake'. Mucha was lead singer in The Druds, a band of artists including Andy Warhol, LaMonte Young, Lucas Samaras, and Walter DeMaria pre-Velvet Underground.

Between 1969 and 1977, Oldenburg was in a relationship with the feminist artist and sculptor, Hannah Wilke, who died in 1993. They shared several studios and traveled together, and Wilke often photographed him.

Oldenburg and his second wife, Coosje van Bruggen, met in 1970 when Oldenburg's first major retrospective traveled to the Stedelijk Museum in Amsterdam, where van Bruggen was a curator. The couple married in 1977.

In 1992, Oldenburg and van Bruggen acquired Château de la Borde, a small Loire Valley chateau, whose music room gave them the idea of making a domestically sized collection. Van Bruggen and Oldenburg renovated the house, decorating it with modernist pieces by among others Le Corbusier, Charles and Ray Eames, and Alvar Aalto, Frank Gehry, Eileen Gray. Van Bruggen died on January 10, 2009, from the effects of breast cancer.

Oldenburg's brother, art historian Richard E. Oldenburg, was director of the Museum of Modern Art, New York, between 1972 and 1993, and later chairman of Sotheby's America.

On July 18, 2022, Oldenburg died at his home in Manhattan from complications of a fall, aged 93.

== Art market ==
Oldenburg's sculpture Typewriter Eraser (1976), the third piece from an edition of three, was sold for $2.2 million at Christie's New York in 2009.

The Whitney Museum of American Art currently houses thirty of Oldenburg's works.

== Gallery ==
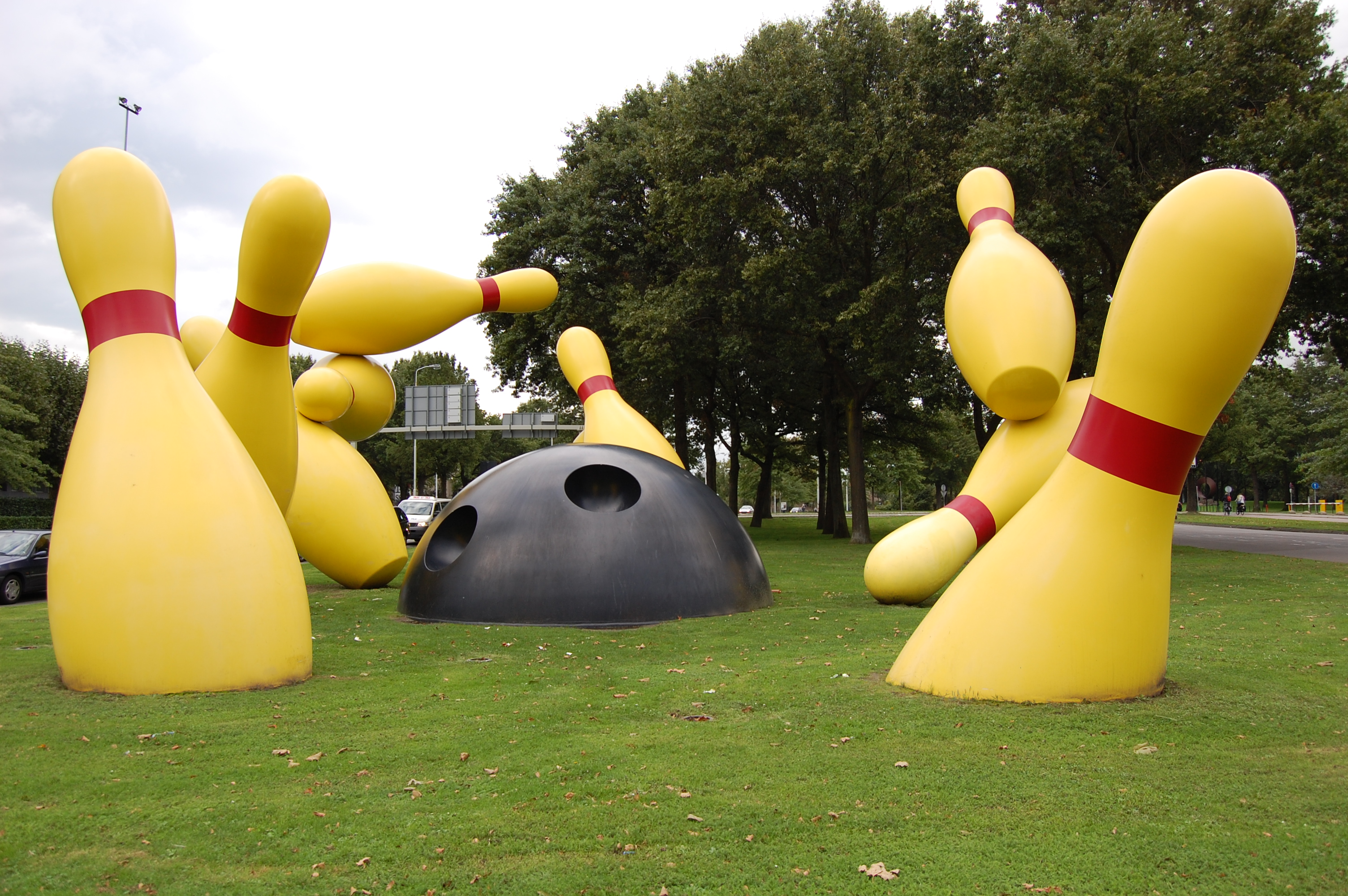
Flying Pins by Claes Oldenburg and Coosje van Bruggen, Eindhoven, Netherlands

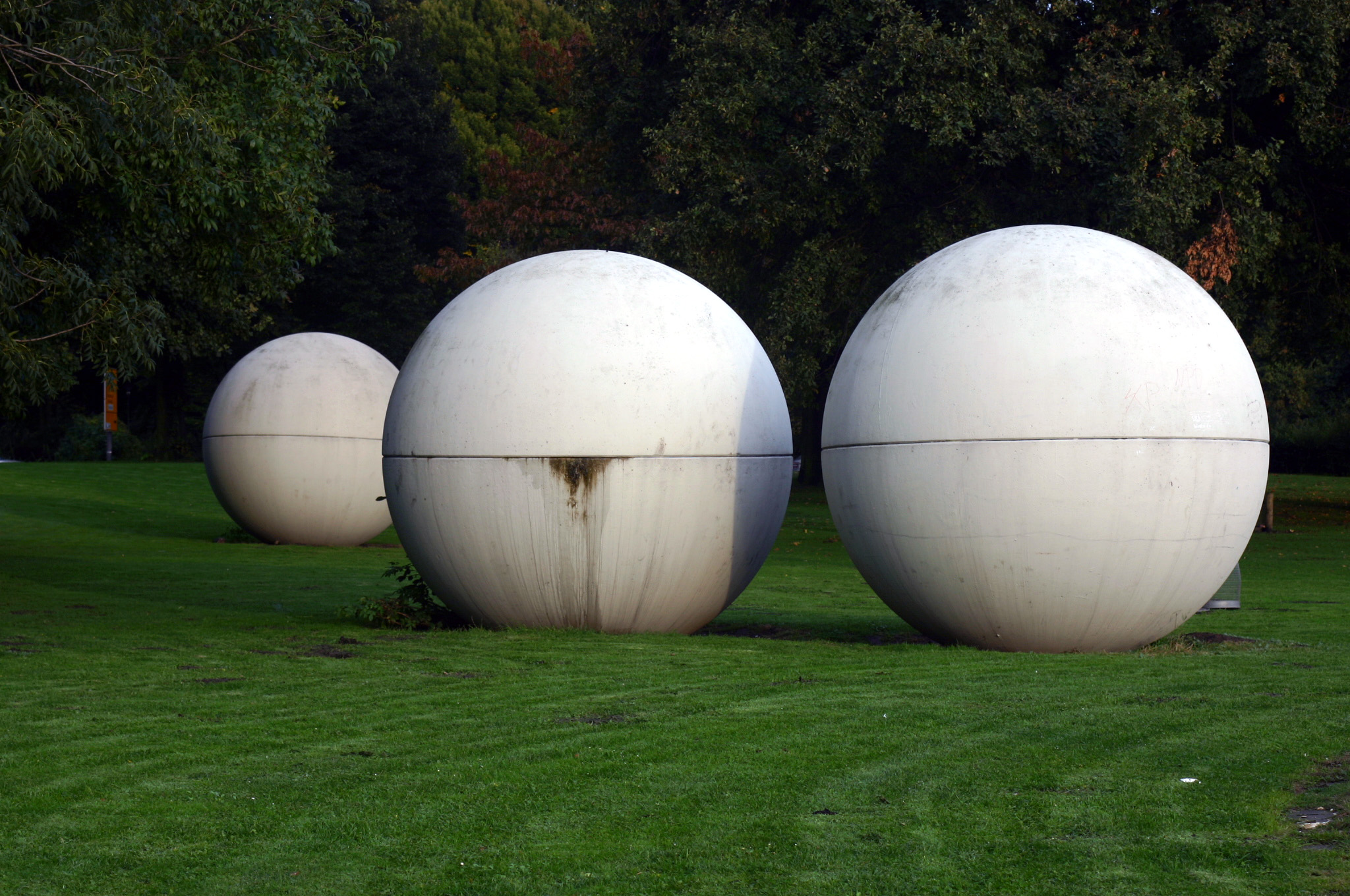
Giant Pool Balls (1977) by Claes Oldenburg and Coosje van Bruggen for Skulptur Projekte Münster, Münster, Germany

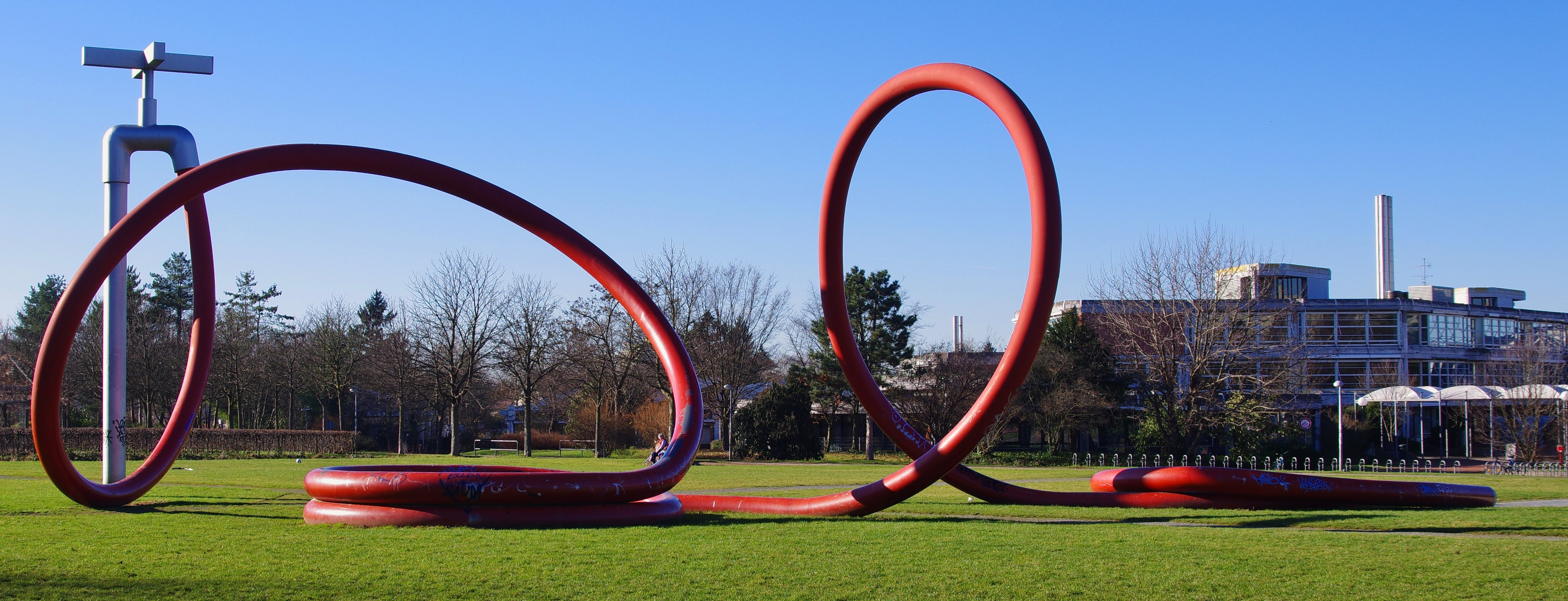
The Garden Hose, Freiburg im Breisgau, Baden-Württemberg, Germany

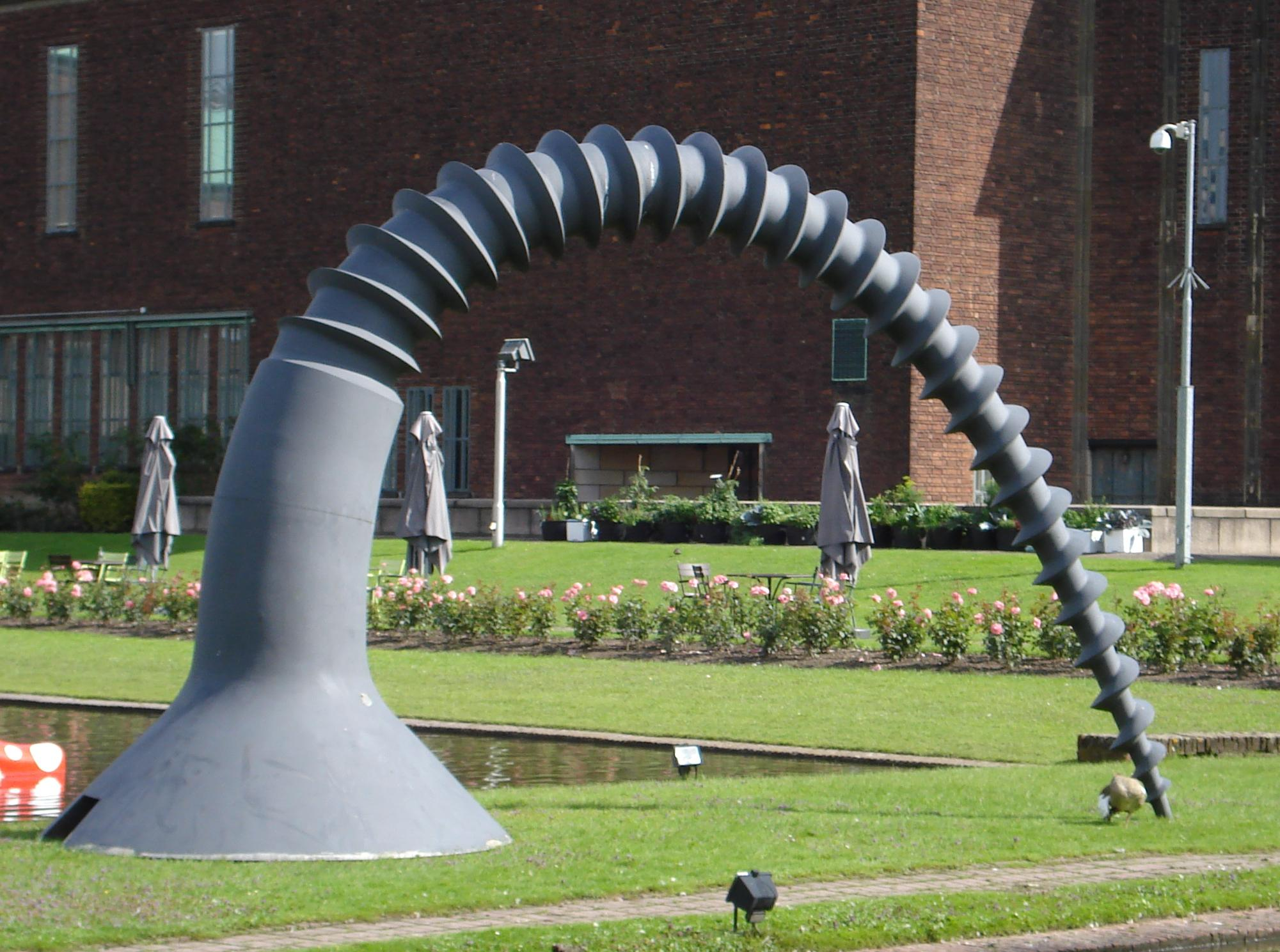
Screw Arch, Museum Boijmans Van Beuningen, Rotterdam, Netherlands

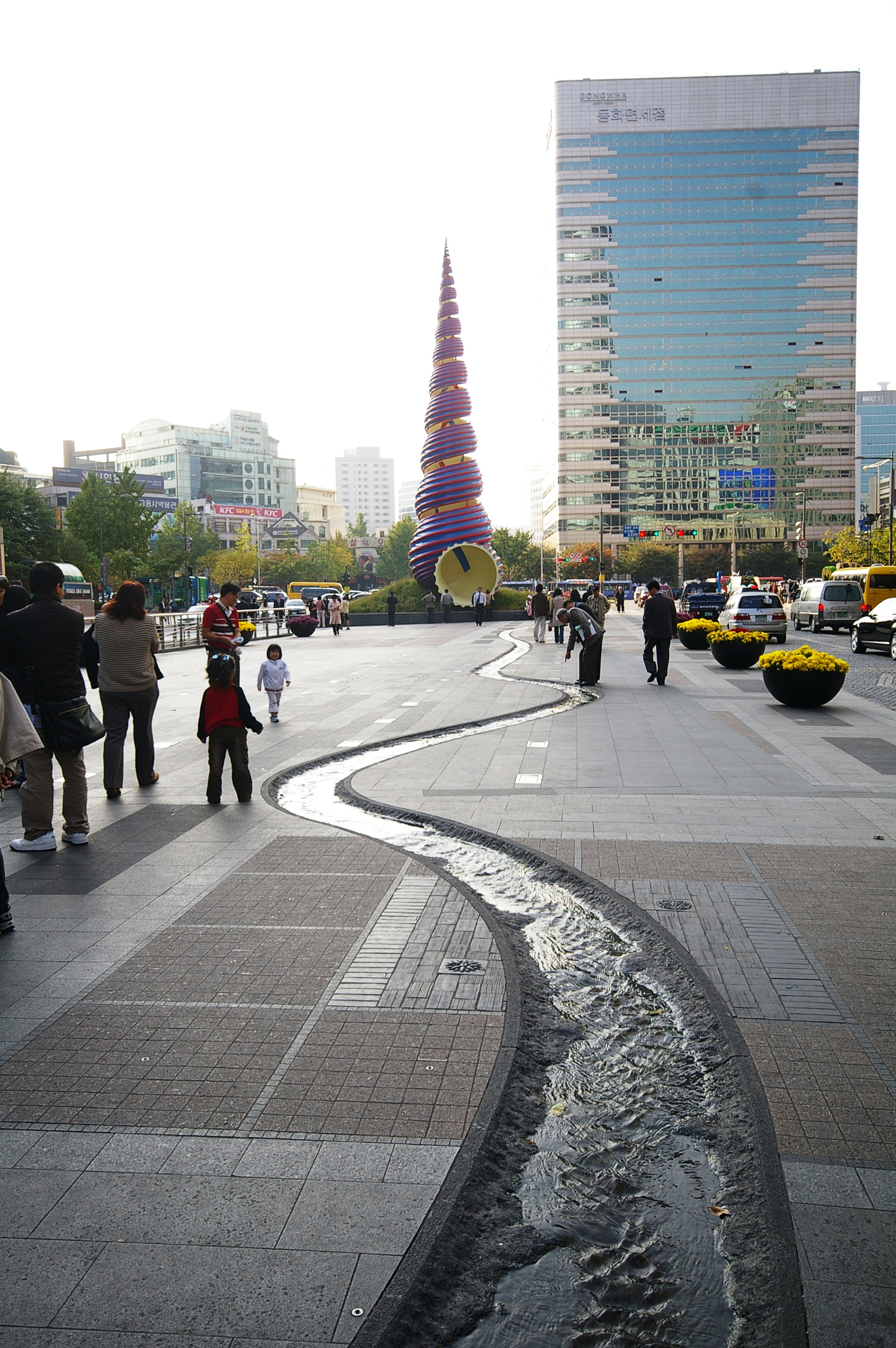
Spring 2006, Coosje van Bruggen and Claes Oldenburg, Cheonggyecheon, Seoul, South Korea

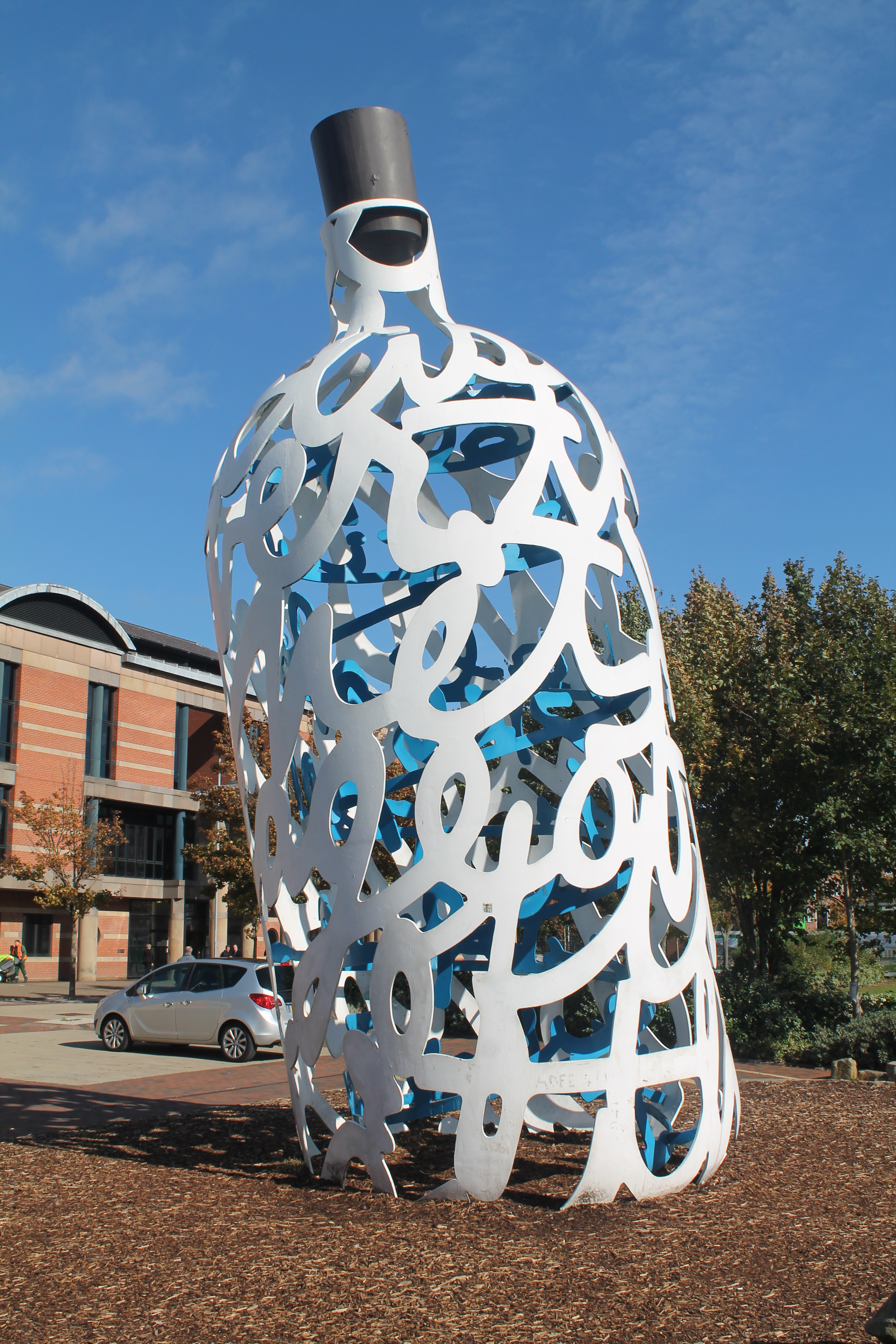
Bottle of Notes, Middlesbrough, North Yorkshire, England

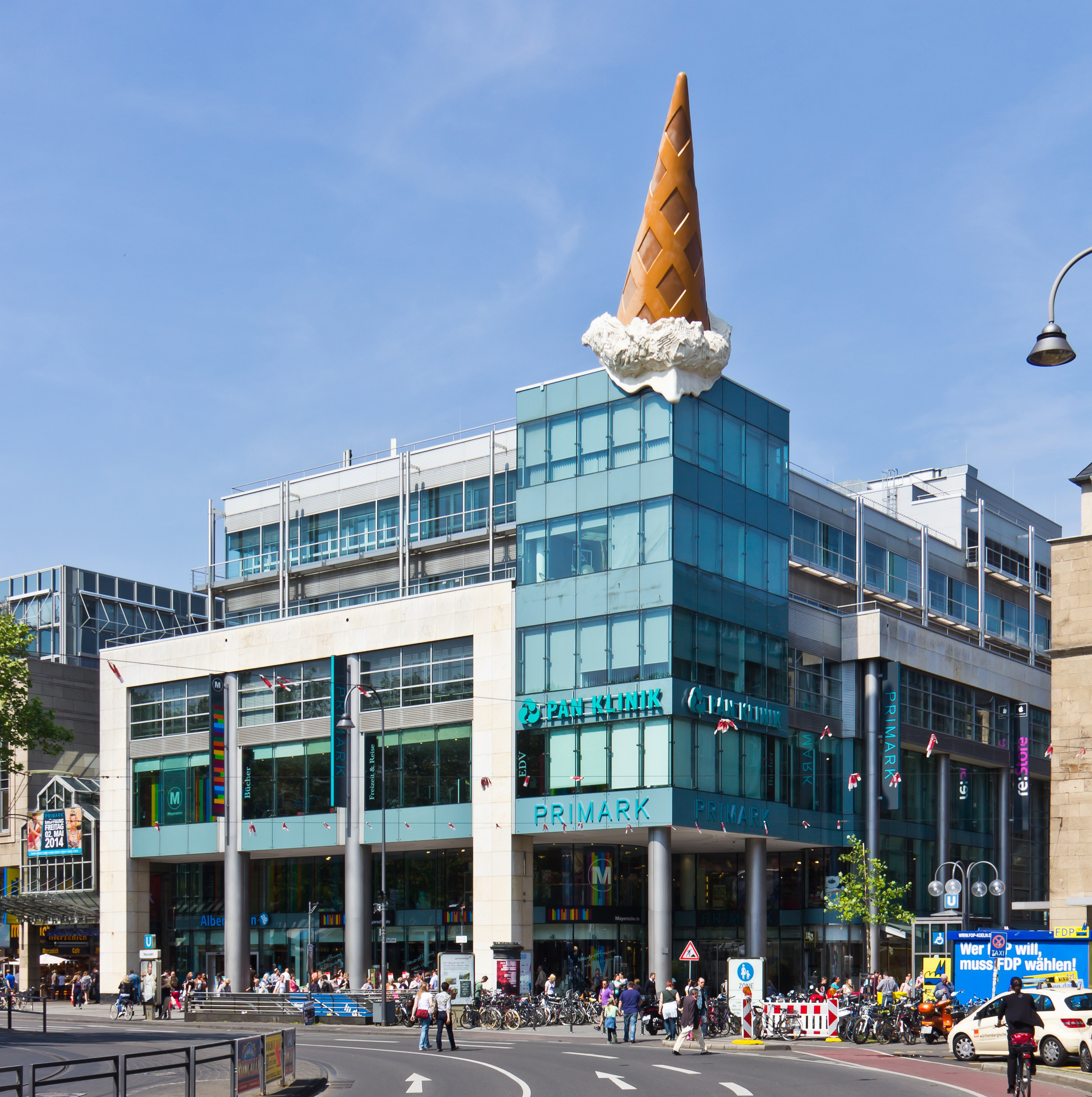
Dropped Cone 2001, Claes Oldenburg and Coosje van Bruggen, Neumarkt area, Cologne, Germany

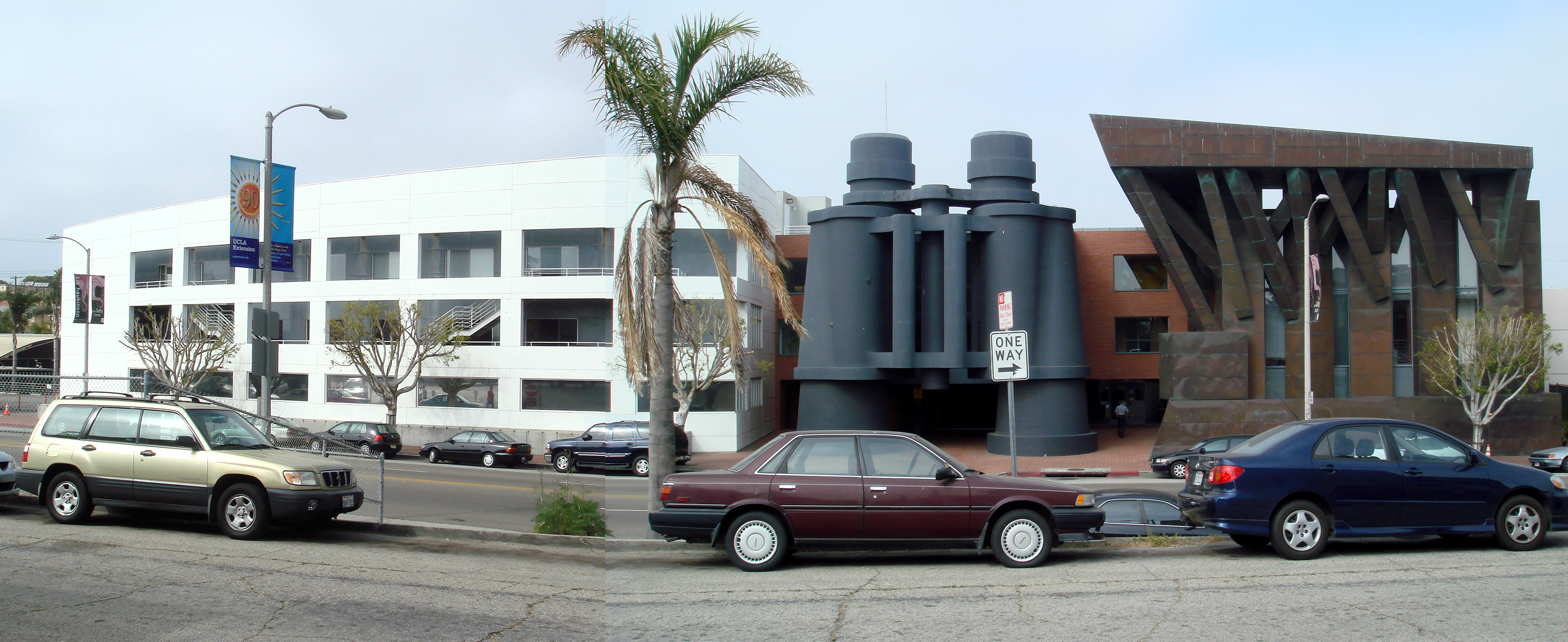
Giant Binoculars, Chiat/Day Building, Venice, Los Angeles, California

May 1974, Clothespin is a weathering steel sculpture by Claes Oldenburg, located at Centre Square, 1500 Market Street, Philadelphia

== See also ==
- Cupid's Span, San Francisco

== General and cited references ==
- Axsom, Richard H., Printed Stuff: Prints, Poster, and Ephemera by Claes Oldenburg A Catalogue Raisonne 1958–1996 (Hudson Hills Press: 1997) ISBN 1-55595-123-6
- Busch, Julia M., A Decade of Sculpture: the New Media in the 1960s (The Art Alliance Press: Philadelphia; Associated University Presses: London, 1974) ISBN 0-87982-007-1
- Gianelli, Ida and Beccaria, Marcella (editors) Claes Oldenburg Coosje van Bruggen: Sculpture by the Way Fundació Joan Miró 2007
- Haskell, Barbara. Claes Oldenburg, Pasadena, CA: Pasadena Art Museum, 1971
- Höchdorfer, Achim, Claes Oldenburg: The Sixties (Prestel: US, 2012) ISBN 3-7913-5205-9
- Johnson, Ellen H. Claes Oldenburg, Penguin Books, (Harmondsworth, Middlesex, England; Baltimore, Maryland, US; Ringwood, Victoria, Australia), 1971
- Oldenburg, Claes. Log May 1974 – August 1976, Stuttgart: edition hansjorg mayer, 1976 (Two volume boxed set: "Photo Log" and "Press Log")
- Oldenburg, Claes. Raw Notes: Documents and Scripts of the Performances: Stars, Moveyhouse, Massage, The Typewriter, with annotations by the author. (The Press of the Nova Scotia College of Art and Design: Halifax, 2005) ISBN 0-919616-43-7
- Thalacker, Donald W. "The Place of Art in the World of Architecture." Chelsea House Publishers, New York, 1980. ISBN 0-87754-098-5
- Valentin, Eric, Claes Oldenburg, Coosje van Bruggen. Le grotesque contre le sacré, Paris, collection Art et artistes, Gallimard, 2009. ISBN 978-2-07-078627-5
- Valentin, Eric, Claes Oldenburg et Coosje van Bruggen. La sculpture comme subversion de l'architecture (1981–1997), Dijon, collection Inflexion, Les Presses du réel, 2012 ISBN 978-2-84066-450-5
