= Elliott Rudwick =

American historian

- Born: Elliott M. Rudwick
- Died: 1985
- Education: Temple University; University of Pennsylvania
- Occupations: Historian and author

Elliott M. Rudwick was a professor of Sociology and History as well as an author in the United States. He wrote about African Americans and their history, including W. E. B. Du Bois. He corresponded with Du Bois. Rudwick worked with historian August Meier on several books. He also wrote about the East St. Louis massacre of 1917.

He graduated from Temple University and received a master's degree and doctorate from the University of Pennsylvania. Prior to joining the Kent State University faculty in 1968, Rudwick had taught at Southern Illinois University, Florida State University and the University of Tampa.

He was a Guggenheim Fellow. In 1967, he was interviewed about "Negro retaliatory violence".

== Bibliography ==
- The Niagara Movement (1957)
- Race Riot at East St. Louis; July 2, 1917 (1964)
- W. E. B. Dubois; Propagandist of the Negro Protest
- Core : A Study in the Civil Rights Movement, 1942–1968 with Meier
- From Plantation To Ghetto with August Meier
- "Fifty Years of Race Relations in East St. Louis: The Breaking Down of White Supremacy"
- "Race Leadership Struggle: Background of the Boston Riot of 1903, The Journal of Negro Education, Vol. 31, No. 1 (Winter, 1962), pp. 16–24
- The Making of Black America; Essays in Negro Life and History (two volumes), edited with August Meier
- Black Detroit and the Rise of the UAW with August Meier
- Along the Color Line, Explorations in the Black Experience, edited with August Meier, University of Illinois Press, 1976
