= Bates Lowry =

American art historian

Bates Lowry (June 23, 1923 – March 12, 2004) was an art historian who was a director of the Museum of Modern Art and founding director of the National Building Museum.

== Early life ==
He was born in Cincinnati, Ohio, received an undergraduate degree from the University of Chicago. He was in the United States Army during World War II. He returned to the University of Chicago after the war and earned a masters and Phd.

== Career ==
He had teaching stints at the University of Chicago, University of California, Riverside, New York University Institute of Fine Arts, Pomona College, the University of Massachusetts Boston, University of Delaware and Brown University.

In 1966, he was a founder of the Committee to Rescue Italian Art to raise funds for the protection of Italian art endangered in Florence, Italy flooding. He remained chairman until 1976.

In 1968–69, he served a 10-month tenure as director the Museum of Modern Art. David Rockefeller, chairman of the museum, said he was dismissed because he had attempted to take on the job of curator of the painting and sculpture at the museum which caused strife in the department and because he did a major renovation to his office without MoMA board approval.

In 1980, he became founding director of the National Building Museum and oversaw the establishment and renovation of its home in the 1881 Pension Building. He remained there until 1987.

== Personal life ==
Lowry died in Brooklyn, New York while visiting his daughter. He had been living in Boston at the time.

== Publications ==
- 1961: The Visual Experience: An Introduction to Art, Prentice-Hall Inc., ISBN 9780139424908
- 1965: Renaissance Architecture, George Braziller Inc., ISBN 9780807603352
- 1985: Building a National Image: Architectural Drawings for the American Democracy, 1789-1912, National Building Museum, ISBN 9780802708731
- 1994: Looking for Leonardo: Naive and Folk Art Objects Found in America, University of Iowa Press, ISBN 9780877454410
- 1998: The Silver Canvas: Daguerreotype Masterpieces from the J. Paul Getty Museum, J. Paul Getty Trust Publications, ISBN 9780892365364

Cultural offices
Preceded by Rene d'Harnoncourt	Directors of the Museum of Modern Art; 1968–1969	Succeeded by John B. Hightower
