= Fernando von Reichenbach =

Argentine engineer and inventor

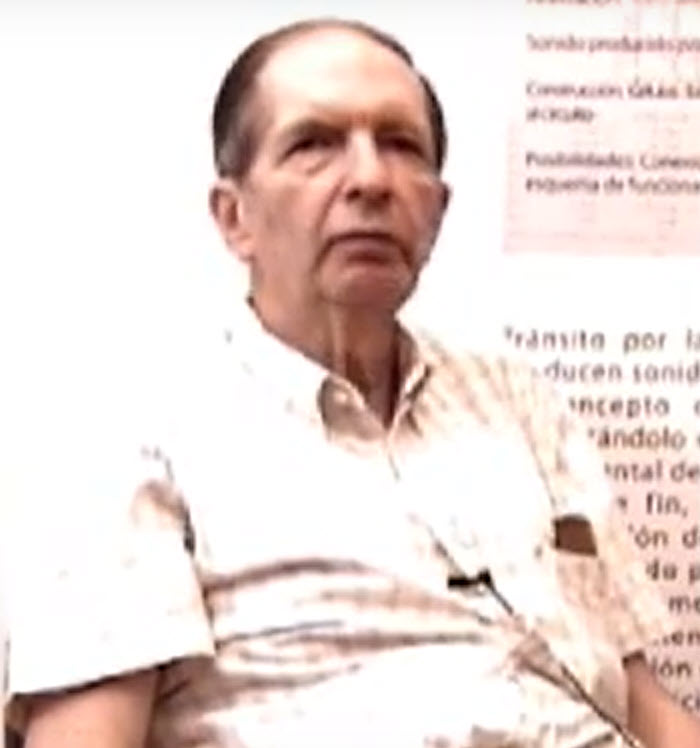
Reichenbach in 2004

Fernando von Reichenbach (1931 – March 17, 2005) was an Argentine engineer and inventor.

== Inventions ==
Some of his inventions were:

- Catalina or graphic analog converter (1967): capable of synthesizing sounds following an analog score by a video camera.
- System for inducing sleep (developed in conjunction with Dr. Fontana), by reproducing maternal prenatal sounds.
- Ultrasonic drill.
