= August Meier =

American historian (1923–2003)

August Meier (April 30, 1923 – March 19, 2003) was a professor of history at Kent State University and an author. He was a leading scholar on African American history, teaching also at Morgan State College, Baltimore. He edited several books with Elliott Rudwick. The New York Public Library has a collection of his papers.

Raised in Newark, New Jersey, Meier graduated from Barringer High School. He graduated from Oberlin College and received an M.A. in 1947 and PhD in 1957 from Columbia University, where he studied under Henry Steele Commager and published his dissertation, Foundational Negro Thought in America: 1880–1915 (1963).

== Writings ==
- Foundational Negro Thought in America: 1880–1915 (1963)
- From Plantation to Ghetto; An Interpretive History of American Negroes, co-author (1970)
- The Making of Black America: The black community in modern America (1971)
- CORE, a Study in the Civil Rights Movement, 1942-1968 (1975)
- Negro Thought in America, 1880-1915; Racial Ideologies in the Age of Booker T. Washington (1988)
- Black history and the historical profession, 1915-1980, co-author (1986)
- Time of Trial, Time of Hope; The Negro in America, 1919-1941, co-author (1986)
- Black Leaders in the Nineteenth Century, co-author (1988)
- Black Leaders in the Twentieth Century, co-author (1988)
- A White Scholar and the Black Community, 1945-1965; Essays and Reflections (1992), a collection of his writings
- Along the Color Line; Explorations in the Black Experience, co-author Elliott M. Rudwick (2002)
- Black Detroit and the Rise of the UAW, co-author (2007)

=== Articles ===
- "New Currents in the Civil Rights Movement," New Politics, Summer 1963.
- "On the role of Martin Luther King" (1965)
