= Roberto Lobo =

Brazilian physicist and university president

- Born: Roberto Leal Lobo e Silva Filho; September 4, 1938; Rio de Janeiro, RJ, Brazil
- Other name: Roberto Leal Lobo
- Occupations: Researcher, Professor, University Manager and Consultant
- Years active: 1962–present
- Known for: President of USP, President of UMC, Director of CNPq, President of Instituto Lobo
- Notable work: Creator of Synchroton, President of the Scientific Committee ALFA, Honorary Doctor of Science Degree by the Purdue University
- Spouse: Maria Beatriz de Carvalho Melo Lobo
- Website: institulolobo.org.br

Roberto Lobo (birthname: Roberto Leal Lobo e Silva Filho), was born in Rio de Janeiro, Brazil, where he graduated in electrical engineering at the Catholic University of Rio de Janeiro (PUC). Later, he received a master and doctorate degrees in physics from Purdue University in the United States. In 1991, Lobo was awarded with the Honorary Doctor of Science Degree (called in some universities "Doctor Honoris Causa"), by Purdue University.

At the University of São Paulo (USP) he developed an academic career as a researcher, full-time professor and manager, holding several command position, reaching its vice - presidency and presidency.

== President of University of São Paulo ==
Having assumed the presidency of USP in a deep financial crisis due to the hyperinflation that Brazil suffered at that time, he had to combine the need for constant improvement of an institution the size of USP with financial restrictions and a need of a deep reorganization.

He cleaned up the university's finances, and improved every major academic (education, research and extension) and institutional indicators.

Under his leadership, the university gave priority to the quality of undergraduate teaching, a difficult task in a research university of this level. New majors were created, many of them with classes taught at night, to serve qualified students who had to work. It also began the most innovative and revolutionary major in Brazil at the time, "molecular sciences", which still exists to this day. Graduates of this program frequently go directly to the best PhDs programs in the world, most of them with prestigious grants from the Government of Brazil and abroad. This major was evaluated by a high level commission from the Academy of Sciences of Brazil and was considered an example of teaching excellence and research in the area.

During his term as president there was big opening of the University for the population, using the campus as a locus of culture and leisure, putting together more than 120,000 people per weekend and, likewise, amplifying the interaction with the community and businesses, increasing significantly the fund raising to support these programs.

== President of University of Mogi das Cruzes ==
Later, he became president of a large private university in Brazil, the University of Mogi das Cruzes.

In his three years as president, UMC changed. As a university dedicated to teaching, (outside the capital of São Paulo and without good quality indicators) and no experience in raising research funds and graduate studies, in only 18 months of work the University of Mogi das Cruzes became the second private institution in the ranking of funding of FAPESP (see below), participated as the only private university in the Genome Project (DNA sequencing in Brazil), created and reorganized several research centers and had two master's degree programs approved by the federal agency graduate of accreditation (CAPES) with the best possible assessment given to new programs. Those programs soon after became doctorate programs.

In addition, UMC image improved significantly, based on an extensive academic advancement program that modernized the curricula of its more than 30 undergraduate majors, a better qualification of the Faculty, with an increase from 9% to 39% the number of masters and doctors among its professors and increased the number of new applicants from 16,000 to 35,000 candidates, all supported additionally by a solid and aggressive marketing plan. UMC financially not only reached equilibrium during that period but it was also able to capture 11% of its budget derived from other programs besides tuitions.

== National Synchrotron Light Laboratory ==
It was as CNPq's Director that he actively participated in the Brazilian Synchrotron Accelerator. The National Synchrotron Light Laboratory has the largest particle accelerator in Latin America and the first in the southern hemisphere. He was responsible for its conceptual project, creation and coordination of deployment for three years, before returning to USP as its vice-president, in 1986.

== International associations ==
He has also several experiences in international associations. Probably the most important one was ALFA, an international program to enhance the scientific collaboration between Europe and Latin America through the financing of joint research projects and mobility programs for student and researches from 895 Higher Education Institutions (373 from Latin America and 522 from Europe) and also 155 associated institutions composing 596 research networks. He was elected by his peers in the Committee vice-president of the committee for three years. Later, he became the committee's president and hold that place from 1997 to 1999.

Other important international experiences as a member of the Columbus Program, a program funded by the European Community with technical support from the Board of Presidents European Community – CRE where he became an international consultant and part of the staff of the training programs for new university presidents in Latin America organized by Columbus. He has also participated in several other international and national committees and boards of prestigious institutions and universities networks in Brazil, United States and Latin America.
