= Robert Harold Wasserman =

Robert Harold Wasserman (11 February 1926, Schenectady, New York – 23 May 2018, Ithaca, New York) was a professor of veterinary medicine and a research scientist, known as the principal investigator leading the scientists credited with the discovery of calcium-binding proteins.

== Biography ==
After graduating from high school in Schenectady, Wasserman matriculated in June 1943 at Union College, where he studied for three months before joining the Army Specialized Training Program and then the U. S. Army for basic training. In October 1944 he was sent overseas, where in December 1944 his division participated in operations of the Battle of the Bulge. After military service in WWII, he spent a year working on a farm in upstate New York and then matriculated at Cornell University. There he graduated with a bachelor's degree in microbiology in 1949. After a year at Michigan State University, where he graduated in August 1950 with a master's degree in microbiology, Wasserman returned to Cornell University. There he graduated in 1953 with a Ph.D. in nutritional microbiology.

From 1953 to 1957, Wasserman was employed at the University of Tennessee's Atomic Energy Commission facility, where he worked on the radiation biology program with Dr. Cyril L. Comar (1914–1979), the program's director. In spring 1958, Wasserman returned to Cornell University as an associate professor in the New York State College of Veterinary Medicine's newly created Laboratory of Radiation Biology. Comar, who had moved to Cornell, in 1957 was the Laboratory's director. Wasserman was promoted in 1963 to full professor and eventually retired from Cornell as professor emeritus.

In the 1990s, his laboratory made pioneering studies using ion microscopic imaging of calcium. He suggested "the presence of a vitamin D induced calcium channel in the intestine (later identified as the vitamin D regulated epithelial calcium channel, TRPV6)."

Wasserman was a member of the editorial boards of the Proceedings of the Society for Experimental Biology and Medicine, The Cornell Veterinarian, Calcified Tissue International, and the Journal of Nutrition. He was the author or co-author of more than 360 research articles, including 14 papers in Science and 7 papers in Nature. Wassermann was on sabbatical leave at the University of Copenhagen in 1964–1965, the University of Leeds in 1972, Woods Hole Marine Biological Laboratory in 1981, and the National Institute on Aging in 1982–1983. He participated in over 40 international conferences on calcium metabolism, bone health, calcification, and vitamin D.

Robert Wasserman married Marilyn Joyce Mintz in 1950 in Ithaca. He was predeceased by his wife after 63 years of marriage. Upon his death he was survived by three daughters and four grandchildren.

== Awards and honors ==
- 1964 — Guggenheim Fellowship (academic year 1964-1965 spent studying under Hans H. Ussing)
- 1969 — Mead Johnson Award in Nutrition from the American Society for Nutrition
- 1971 — Guggenheim Fellowship
- 1974 — Burroughs Lectureship at Iowa State University
- 1980 — Member of the National Academy of Sciences
- 1987 — Burroughs Lectureship at Iowa State University
- 1982 — Prix André Lichtwitz from the Institut National de la Santé et de la Recherche Médicale-Paris
- 1989 — MERIT Award from the National Institute of Diabetes and Digestive and Kidney Diseases
- 1990 — William F. Neuman Award of the American Society for Bone and Mineral Research
- 1992 — Fellow of the American Society for Nutrition

== Selected publications ==
- Davis, R.F.; Wasserman, R.H.; Loosli, J.K.; Grippin, C.H. (1955). "Studies on the Availability of Nitrogen from Various Ammoniated Products for Rumen Bacteria and Dairy Cattle". Journal of Dairy Science. 38 (6): 677–687. doi:10.3168/jds.S0022-0302(55)95024-4. ISSN 0022-0302.
- Comar, C. L.; Russell, R. S.; Wasserman, R. H. (1957). "Strontium-Calcium Movement from Soil to Man". Science. 126 (3272): 485–492. Bibcode:1957Sci...126..485C. doi:10.1126/science.126.3272.485. ISSN 0036-8075. PMID 13467231. S2CID 27225206.
- Wasserman, R. H.; Kallfelz, F. A.; Comar, C. L. (1961). "Active Transport of Calcium by Rat Duodenum in vivo". Science. 133 (3456): 883–884. Bibcode:1961Sci...133..883W. doi:10.1126/science.133.3456.883. ISSN 0036-8075. PMID 13783309. S2CID 20556199.
- Wasserman, R. H.; Taylor, A. N. (1966). "Vitamin D_{3}-Induced Calcium-Binding Protein in Chick Intestinal Mucosa". Science. 152 (3723): 791–793. Bibcode:1966Sci...152..791W. doi:10.1126/science.152.3723.791. ISSN 0036-8075. PMID 17797460. S2CID 8221178.
- Krook, L.; Wasserman, R. H.; Shively, J. N.; Tashjian Jr, A. H.; Brokken, T. D.; Morton, J. F. (1975). "Hypercalcemia and calcinosis in Florida horses: implication of the shrub, Cestrum diurnum, as the causative agent". The Cornell Veterinarian. 65 (1): 26–56. PMID 1112096.
- Wasserman, R.; Henion, J.; Haussler, M.; McCain, T. (1976). "Calcinogenic factor in Solanum malacoxylon: evidence that it is 1,25-dihydroxyvitamin D3-glycoside". Science. 194 (4267): 853–855. doi:10.1126/science.982048. ISSN 0036-8075. PMID 982048.
- Howe, C. L.; Keller, T. C. S.; Mooseker, M. S.; Wasserman, R. H. (1982). "Analysis of cytoskeletal proteins and Ca2+-dependent regulation of structure in intestinal brush borders from rachitic chicks". Proceedings of the National Academy of Sciences. 79 (4): 1134–1138. Bibcode:1982PNAS...79.1134H. doi:10.1073/pnas.79.4.1134. PMC 345915. PMID 6951164.
- Fullmer, C. S.; Wasserman, R. H. (1987). "Chicken intestinal 28-kilodalton calbindin-D: Complete amino acid sequence and structural considerations". Proceedings of the National Academy of Sciences. 84 (14): 4772–4776. Bibcode:1987PNAS...84.4772F. doi:10.1073/pnas.84.14.4772. PMC 305187. PMID 3474624.
- Lee, Y. S.; Taylor, A. N.; Reimers, T. J.; Edelstein, S.; Fullmer, C. S.; Wasserman, R. H. (1987). "Calbindin-D in peripheral nerve cells is vitamin D and calcium dependent". Proceedings of the National Academy of Sciences. 84 (20): 7344–7348. Bibcode:1987PNAS...84.7344L. doi:10.1073/pnas.84.20.7344. PMC 299289. PMID 3478696.
- Chandra, S.; Fullmer, C. S.; Smith, C. A.; Wasserman, R. H.; Morrison, G. H. (1990). "Ion microscopic imaging of calcium transport in the intestinal tissue of vitamin D-deficient and vitamin D-replete chickens: A 44Ca stable isotope study". Proceedings of the National Academy of Sciences. 87 (15): 5715–5719. Bibcode:1990PNAS...87.5715C. doi:10.1073/pnas.87.15.5715. PMC 54398. PMID 2377608.
- Cai, Q.; Chandler, J. S.; Wasserman, R. H.; Kumar, R.; Penniston, J. T. (1993). "Vitamin D and adaptation to dietary calcium and phosphate deficiencies increase intestinal plasma membrane calcium pump gene expression". Proceedings of the National Academy of Sciences. 90 (4): 1345–1349. Bibcode:1993PNAS...90.1345C. doi:10.1073/pnas.90.4.1345. PMC 45869. PMID 7679502.
- De Talamoni, N.; Smith, C. A.; Wasserman, R. H.; Beltramino, C.; Fullmer, C. S.; Penniston, J. T. (1993). "Immunocytochemical localization of the plasma membrane calcium pump, calbindin-D28k, and parvalbumin in Purkinje cells of avian and mammalian cerebellum". Proceedings of the National Academy of Sciences. 90 (24): 11949–11953. Bibcode:1993PNAS...9011949D. doi:10.1073/pnas.90.24.11949. PMC 48102. PMID 8265654.
