= Near North (neighborhood), Minneapolis =

Coordinates: 44.9945°N 93.2983°W

North Minneapolis
- Neighborhood
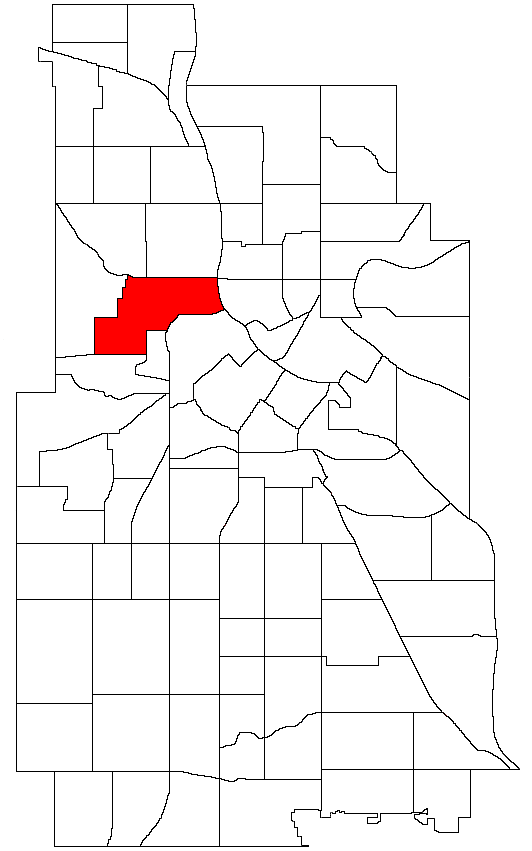
- Location of Near North within the U.S. city of Minneapolis
- Interactive map of North Minneapolis
- Country: United States
- State: Minnesota
- County: Hennepin
- City: Minneapolis
- Community: Near North
- City Council ward: 5

Government
  - Council member: Pearll Warren

Area
  - Total: 1.136 sq mi (2.94 km^{2})

Population (2020)
  - Total: 6,667
  - Density: 5,869/sq mi (2,266/km^{2})
- Time zone: UTC-6 (CST)
  - Summer (DST): UTC-5 (CDT)
- ZIP code: 55411
- Area code: 612

Historical population
| Census | Pop. | Note | %± |
|---|---|---|---|
| 1980 | 5,911 | | — |
| 1990 | 6,175 | | 4.5% |
| 2000 | 6,921 | | 12.1% |
| 2010 | 5,968 | | −13.8% |
| 2020 | 6,667 | | 11.7% |

Near North is one of six neighborhoods in the Near North community of Minneapolis. It is located in Ward 5 of the represented by city council and in state legislative district 59B.

== Geography and demographics ==
The neighborhood is located directly north of the more industrial and historic neighborhoods of Minneapolis, the North Loop. It is one of Minneapolis’s historically Black neighborhoods.

It is bordered by the Hawthorne and Jordan neighborhoods to the north, St. Anthony West across the Mississippi River to the east, North Loop, Sumner-Glenwood, and Harrison to the south, and Willard-Hay to the west. Official boundaries are the Mississippi River and Emerson Avenue on the east, West Broadway Avenue on the north, a combination of streets from Irving Avenue to Penn Avenue on the west, and Olson Memorial Highway and 11th Avenue North on the south.

Portions of Near North east of Dupont Avenue form the unofficial neighborhood of Lyn Park, home of Minnesota Senate president Bobby Joe Champion.

Race/ethnicity
| Race/ethnicity | 2000 | | 2010 | | 2020 | |
| Race/ethnicity | Number | % | Number | % | Number | % |
|---|---|---|---|---|---|---|
| White alone | 893 | 12.90 | 810 | 13.57 | 899 | 13.27 |
| Black alone | 4,002 | 57.82 | 3,355 | 56.22 | 4,048 | 59.74 |
| Hispanic or Latino (any race) | 625 | 9.03 | 655 | 10.98 | 775 | 11.44 |
| Native American alone | 68 | 0.98 | 61 | 1.02 | 99 | 1.46 |
| Asian alone | 983 | 14.20 | 765 | 12.82 | 586 | 8.65 |
| Other race alone | 31 | 0.45 | 17 | 0.28 | 23 | 0.34 |
| Pacific Islander alone | 7 | 0.10 | 0 | 0.00 | 2 | 0.03 |
| Two or more races | 312 | 4.51 | 305 | 5.11 | 344 | 5.08 |
| Total | 6,921 | 100.0 | 5,968 | 100.0 | 6,776 | 100.0 |

== Historic structures ==
The neighborhood contains three buildings listed on the National Register of Historic Places:

- Minneapolis Public Library, North Branch
- Sumner Community Library
- John Lohmar House

== See also ==
- Neighborhoods of Minneapolis
