= List of public art in Minneapolis =

This is a list of public art in Minneapolis, in the United States. This list applies only to works of public art on permanent display in an outdoor public space. For example, this does not include artworks in museums. Public art may include sculptures, statues, monuments, memorials, murals, and mosaics.

Image	Title / subject	Location and coordinates	Date	Artist / designer	Type	Material	Dimensions	Designation	Owner / administrator	Wikidata	Notes
	Cottontail on the Trail	Minnehaha Park 44°54′44.2″N 93°16′01.8″W	2002	Jeff Barber	Statue	Bronze				Q95299403	
More images	Hiawatha and Minnehaha	Minnehaha Park 44.9155°N 93.2117°W	1912	Jacob Fjelde	Statue	Bronze				Q16892281	
	Inner Search	Outside of the Wells Fargo Operations Center 44°58′48″N 93°15′57″W	1980	Mark di Suvero	Sculpture	COR-TEN steel, stainless steel					Removed in 2022
More images	Minneapolis Sculpture Garden	Near the Walker Art Center 44°58′13″N 93°17′20″W	1988		Sculpture garden					Q690225	
	Shadows at the Crossroads	Minneapolis Sculpture Garden	2019	Ta-coumba T. Aiken; Seitu Jones	Sculptures					Q106741356	A collection of seven sculptures
	Spoonbridge and Cherry	Minneapolis Sculpture Garden 44°58′12.9″N 93°17′20.7″W	1988	Claes Oldenburg; Coosje van Bruggen	Sculpture; Fountain	Aluminum; Stainless steel				Q18084723	
	Statue of Calvin Griffith	Outside of Target Field	2010		Statue					Q97356663	Removed in 2020
