= Nellie Stone Johnson =

American civil rights activist and union organizer

- Johnson in 1943
- Born: Nellie Saunders Allen; December 17, 1905; Dakota County, Minnesota
- Died: April 2, 2002 (aged 96); Minneapolis, Minnesota
- Education: GED from University of Minnesota, 1925; Attended University of Wisconsin
- Alma mater: Honorary Doctor of Letters, St. Cloud State University, 1995
- Occupations: Union organizer; Seamstress
- Organization: NAACP
- Political party: Democratic National Committee (1979–1988); Nonpartisan League Young Socialists; Socialist Workers Party; Young Communists League; Farmer-Labor Party; Minnesota Democratic-Farmer-Labor Party
- Movement: Labor movement; Civil rights movement; Minneapolis National Association for the Advancement of Colored People (NAACP)
- Board member of: Vice-President Hotel and Restaurant International Union, Local 665; Vice-President, Minnesota Culinary Council; Minneapolis Library Board, 1945–1951; Minnesota State University Board; Minnesota State Colleges and Universities Board of Trustees; Minneapolis Urban League
- Spouses: Clyde Stone, m. 1931; Lee Johnson, m. 1947
- Awards: Urban League's Cecil E. Newman Humanitarian Award, Distinguished Minnesotan Award; Bemidji State University; WCCO Good Neighbor Award.

Nellie Stone Johnson (December 17, 1905 – April 2, 2002) was an American civil rights activist and union organizer. She was the first African-American elected official in Minneapolis and shaped Minnesota politics for 70 years.

Johnson helped form the Minnesota Democratic–Farmer–Labor Party (DFL) and spearheaded the effort to create the first Fair Employment Practices department in the nation. She counseled both Hubert Humphrey and Walter Mondale and was on the Democratic National Committee in the 1980s.

== Early life and education ==
Nellie Saunders Allen was born, the oldest of eight, in Dakota County, Minnesota, near Lakeville, to William and Gladys (née Foree) Allen, one of the few black farming families in Minnesota in the early 1900s. Nellie’s family owned their first two farms between 1905 and 1918. Her mother was a college-educated schoolteacher from Kentucky and had African American, French, Irish and American Indian ancestry. Their family had a dairy farm and her father was involved with the Nonpartisan League, helping organize farmers and co-founding the Twin Cities Milk Producers Association. When she was 13, she distributed literature for the Nonpartisan League on her way to school. Nellie attended public schools in both Dakota and Pine Counties. The family moved to a larger farm east of Hinckley in 1919. She would milk cows every morning and earned money by trapping muskrat and mink. She joined the NAACP as a teenager. Nellie attended school in Clover Township, which only taught up to the 10th grade.

In September 1922, Nellie moved to Minneapolis where she was a live-in nanny for a white family that lived close to Loring Park. She then moved into her aunt and uncle's house in north Minneapolis. She took extension courses at the University of Minnesota, initially at the agriculture school. She took chemistry, intending to become a pharmacist, before gravitating towards social and political science. While at the university she took classes from E. W. Ziebarth and met Paul Robeson and Swan Assarson. She finished her GED in 1925.

== Labor organizing and political activity ==
In 1924, she was hired as an elevator attendant at the all-male Minneapolis Athletic Club, earning $15 per week. After her wages were cut to $12.50, she began quietly organizing workers with the Minneapolis Hotel and Restaurant Workers union. In the 1930s she joined the University of Minnesota's Young Communist League. In 1936, she became a member and then vice president of AFL's Local 665, Hotel and Restaurant Workers union.

Johnson met future Vice President Hubert Humphrey in 1941 at Duluth State College. She would later mentor him in civil rights issues. In 1944, she was on the committee that merged the moderate Minnesota Democratic Party with the more radical Farmer–Labor Party, forming the Minnesota Democratic–Farmer–Labor Party (DFL).

In 1945, she was elected to the Library Board and became the first black person to be elected to a citywide office in Minneapolis.

Johnson was the main force behind the creation of state and local Fair Employment Practices departments, which later became the Minneapolis Civil Rights Commission and the state Human Rights Department. In the 1940s she spearheaded the drive to create the Minneapolis Fair Employment Practices department, which was the first of its kind in the nation. In 1955, she led the initiative to create a statewide version of the Minneapolis legislation, the Employment Practices Act of 1955. She also authored the 1950 initiative from the Minneapolis NAACP that led to the desegregation of the US armed forces.

She had differences with the Communist party leadership in 1946.

She was fired from her job at the Minneapolis Athletic Club in 1950 and in October 1950, she resigned her position as Chair of the Hennepin County Progressive Party. She lost a union election for the Local 665 in January 1951, at a time when left wing officers in the union were on the wane. In February 1951, Johnson formally severed her relations with the Progressive and Communist Parties.

"I've always been preaching a simple message, jobs, jobs, jobs. Clear back in 1950s, it was fashionable for white liberals to go out to dinner with black people. They'd take you to a restaurant like Charlie's and people would think 'Isn't this nice? This wouldn't happen in some places.' But I'd say, even then, 'What good does it do if we can go into nice restaurants if we can't afford to order in them."

== Later life ==
In the 1960s, she raised money for the Freedom Marches of Martin Luther King.

A seamstress, in 1963 Johnson opened her own sewing and alterations shop in the old Kresge building. She continued her business in downtown Minneapolis for over 30 years. In the 1980s her store in the Lumber Exchange Building was known as Nellie's Shirt & Zipper Shop and in 1988 her store was named Nellie's Alterations.

Johnson continued to be active in state and local politics and was Van Freeman White's campaign manager in his successful 1979 bid for a seat on the Minneapolis City Council. She traveled to Africa for the State Department with Vice President Walter Mondale in 1980 and Governor Rudy Perpich appointed her to the Minnesota State University Board in 1982. In the 1980s she was a member of the Democratic National Committee for two terms.

After a power struggle, she was ousted from the Minneapolis Urban League in 1987.

The Nellie Stone Johnson Scholarship Program was founded in 1989 and offers scholarships to minority students from union families.

Johnson released an autobiography in 2000, Nellie Stone Johnson: The Life of an Activist. The book was edited and organized by David Brauer from over 50 interviews.

Johnson was a trustee of the Minneapolis Public Library and a board member of MnSCU. She received a lifetime achievement award from the Black Caucus of the American Association for Higher Education in 2000.

== Death and legacy ==
She died on April 2, 2002, in Minneapolis. She was 96.

Nellie Stone Johnson Community School in Minneapolis is named for her. She was an inspiration for the 1992 public artwork Shadows of Spirit by Seitu Jones and Ta-coumba Aiken. Nellie, a 2013 play about her life, premiered at St. Paul's History Theatre in 2013. A statue of Nellie Stone Johnson by Sculptor Tim Cleary was unveiled at the Minnesota State Capitol November 21, 2022, and was first statue of a woman on Capitol grounds.

== Personal life ==
Johnson was married twice, to Clyde Stone for eight years, and to Lee Johnson for five years. Both marriages ended in divorce.

== See also ==
- List of civil rights leaders
