= Nyeema Morgan =

American visual artist (born 1977)

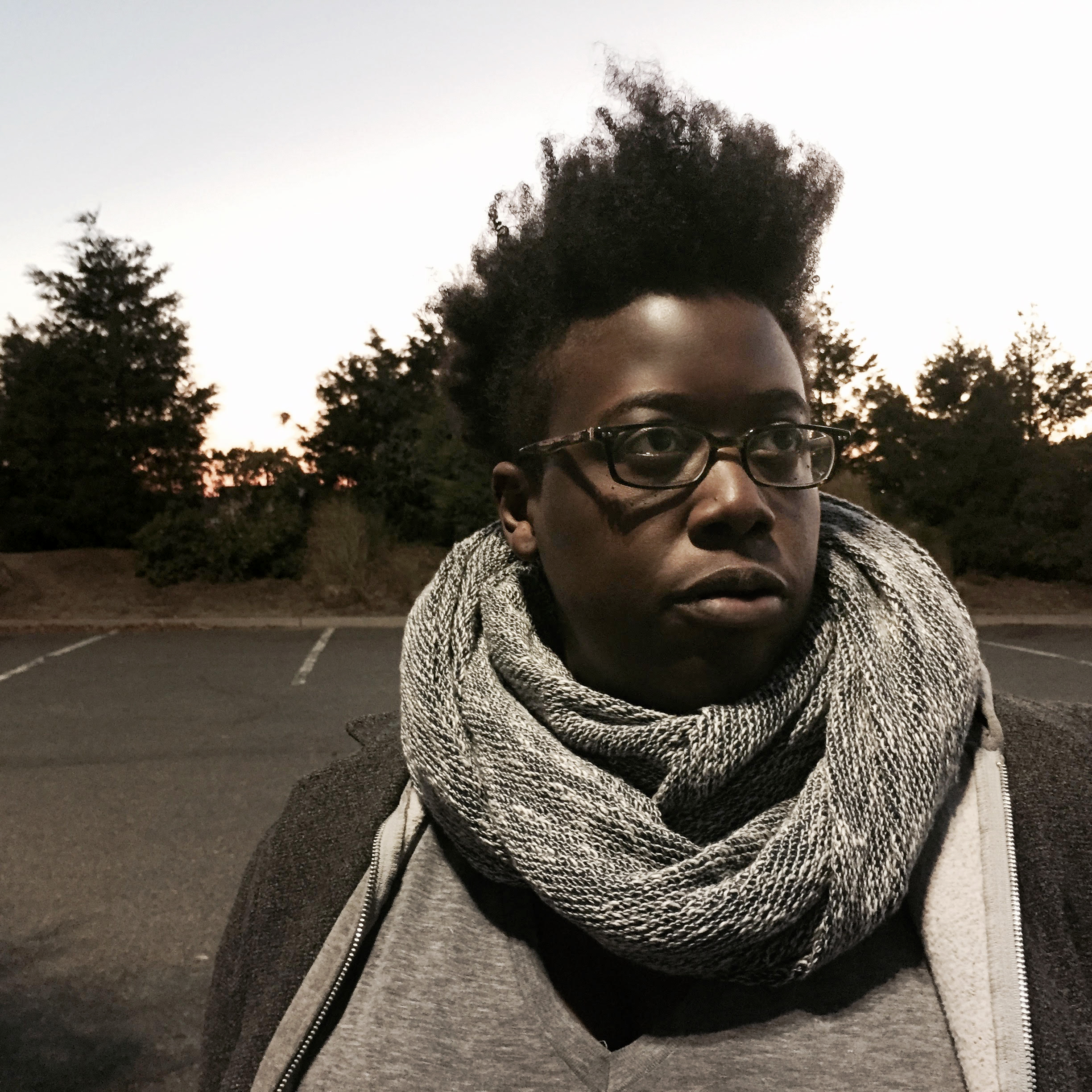
- Born: 1977 (age 48–49); Philadelphia, Pennsylvania, US
- Education: Cooper Union School of Art (BFA); California College of the Arts (MFA)
- Known for: Conceptual art, installation art
- Notable work: Like It Is: Those Extraordinary Twins yawar mallku (sculpting elsewhere in time / the arc of the moral universe is long… / the Lesson, pt. 2)
- Website: nyeemamorgan.com

Nyeema Morgan (born 1977) is an American interdisciplinary and conceptual artist. Working in drawing, sculpture and print media, her works focus on how meaning is constructed and communicated given complex socio-political systems. Born in Philadelphia, she earned her BFA from the Cooper Union School of Art and her MFA from the California College of the Arts. She has held artist residencies at the Skowhegan School of Painting and Sculpture and Smack Mellon. Morgan's works are in the permanent collections of the Bowdoin College Museum of Art and the Menil Collection.

== Early life and education ==
Morgan was born in 1977 in Philadelphia, Pennsylvania to artists Arlene Burke-Morgan and Clarence Morgan. She was raised in Greenville, North Carolina and attended South High School in Minneapolis, Minnesota. As a youth artist she was mentored by artists Rafala Green, Seitu Jones and Ta-coumba Aiken and was among the seventeen young artists selected to recreate a work by muralist John T. Biggers on an Olson Memorial Highway sound barrier as part of the North Community Mural Project.

Morgan attended The Cooper Union for the Advancement of Science and Art where she earned her BFA in 2000. She earned her MFA from the California College of the Arts in 2007. She was an artist-in-residence at the Skowhegan School of Painting and Sculpture in Maine in 2009.

== Career ==
Morgan is a mixed media and installation artist. Her works incorporate text-based media, sculptural elements, and drawing and focus on how meaning is constructed and communicated given complex socio-political systems. She has described her work as exploring the "personal and cultural economy of knowledge through familiar artifacts". As of 2021, she has had nine solo or duo exhibitions and has held residencies at Smack Mellon and the Skowhegan School of Painting and Sculpture.

Morgan's solo and two person exhibitions include THE STEM. THE FLOWER. THE ROOT. THE SEED. at the Boulder Museum of Contemporary Art, Asians Smaisians and Other Racial Slurs with the artist Mike Cloud at the Marlborough Contemporary Gallery in New York, horror horror at Grant Wahlquist Gallery in Portland, Maine, and I, Rhinoceros at the Staniar Gallery at Washington and Lee University. Her work has been part of numerous group exhibitions including at The Drawing Center, the Studio Museum in Harlem (in collaboration with artists William Cordova and Otabenga Jones & Associates), Galerie Jeanroch Dard, the Bowdoin College Museum of Art, and the Museum of African and Diasporan Arts.

Morgan has participated in artist residencies including the Lower Manhattan Cultural Council's Workspace Program (2013), Smack Mellon (2015), Aljira: Emerge 10 (2007), Abrons Art Center Airspace Program (2010) and Shandanken Project at Storm King Art Center (2016). She has been the recipient of the Joan Mitchell Painters & Sculptors Grant and an Art Matters Foundation Grant. Morgan has lectured on her work at the University of Illinois at Chicago, the University of Minnesota, Washington and Lee and University and Brooklyn College (City University of New York).

In 2013, Morgan participated in the Afrofuturist exhibition The Shadows Took Shape at the Studio Museum in Harlem. She was among the artists to construct a miniature wooden spacecraft modelled on the Star Wars spacecraft the Millennium Falcon with Otabenga Jones & Associates and William Cordova. A tiny replica of Eldridge Cleaver's book Soul on Ice was included in the spacecraft's library, which is devoted to cultural studies. This work, titled yawar mallku (sculpting elsewhere in time / the arc of the moral universe is long… / the Lesson, pt. 2), is a permanent member of the Menil Collection.

== Selected works ==
=== Forty-Seven Easy Poundcakes Like grandma Use To Make ===
Morgan's work Forty-Seven Easy Poundcakes Like grandma Use To Make consists of a series of text-based digital drawings printed on index cards based on recipes for "easy pound cake". She started the series in 2007 after experiencing a Starbucks pound cake that did not compare favorably with memories of her grandmother's version. This led her to an exploration of the authenticity of pound cake and the discovery of only 46 recipes on the Internet with distinct methods of preparation or ingredients. She edited each recipe against her grandmother's, using a procedure of striking or layering words and changing their positions until the drawing resembled what a Wall Street Journal reviewer referred to as "Etch-a-Sketch-like patterns that both emphasize words and constrain them". The series of 47 drawings debuted at The Bindery Projects in Saint Paul, Minnesota in 2012 as part of the exhibition The Dubious Sum of Vaguely Discernable Parts. An opening for a solo exhibition featuring the series at Brooklyn's BRIC Arts Media in 2013 included 47 actual pound cakes baked by volunteers based on each different recipe.

=== Like It Is: Those Extraordinary Twins ===
The 2018 exhibition Second Sight: The Paradox of Vision in Contemporary Art at the Bowdoin College Museum of Art included Morgan's 2016 work Like It Is: Those Extraordinary Twins. The graphite drawing depicts a scanned representation of the title page of a 2005 edition of The Tragedy of Pudd'nhead Wilson and Those Extraordinary Twins by Mark Twain's 1894 book, cropped to only include the text "those extraordinary twins". The left side of the work includes a double silhouette, ostensibly of the artist at work. The following page's underlying text is visible in the drawing. Like It Is: Those Extraordinary Twins is in the permanent collection of the Bowdoin College Museum of Art.

=== THE STEM. THE FLOWER. THE ROOT. THE SEED. ===
Morgan's 2020 solo exhibition THE STEM. THE FLOWER. THE ROOT. THE SEED. at the Boulder Museum of Contemporary Art, curated by London based curator Rose van Mierlo, was part of the museum's yearlong programming during the centennial of women's suffrage. Works included were: THE STEM. THE FLOWER. THE ROOT. THE SEED., a figurative installation featuring printed material, The Flower, No. 4, that the audience could take from the exhibition; The Flower, No. 3, an installation of discretely placed white vinyl text throughout the gallery space that alluded to the narratives about the lives of women, both fictional and real; Soft. Power. Hard Margins., a suite of seven sculptures that address the "permissive authority" of historical art works by women artists. This piece explored archetypes of femininity through the combination of images obscured with references to narratives in cutout lettering set in ornately framed shadowboxes. Curator van Mierlo said that Morgan's art was "brilliant at deconstructing this mechanism of mythmaking as a cultural and historical process, while at the same time enveloping the audience in a form of storytelling of her own."

== Personal life ==
Morgan lives in Chicago and is married to artist Mike Cloud. They have two children.
