= Courtenay Finn =

Courtenay Finn is an American curator who is the chief curator at the Orange County Museum of Art. She was named curator of Aspen Art Museum in January 2014 and chief curator at Museum of Contemporary Art Cleveland in September 2018 before she joined the Orange County Museum of Art in 2022.

Formerly the curator at Art in General from early 2011 to 2014, Finn's exhibitions include the gallery's 30th anniversary exhibition Walking Forward-Running Past and the Zefrey Throwell participatory piece I'll Raise You One… as part of the performance art biennial Performa's 2011 edition. The Throwell piece had strip poker players bearing all in the gallery's street-level storefront space, while crowds of voyeurs clogged the street outside. She also curated solo exhibitions, You Are Here, This Is Now with artist Nyeema Morgan and Fifteen Seconds with photographer Lia Lowenthal, while at Art in General.

In June 2013, Finn and Art in General director Anne Barlow co-curated the Latvian Pavilion at the Venice Biennale, along with Alise Tīfentāle, organizing a two-artist show by Kaspars Podnieks and Krišs Salmanis. She has also curated a show at Apex Art in 2010 called "You can't get there from here but you can get here from there" which included work by Sophie Calle, Patty Chang, Rodney Graham, Joachim Koester, Kris Martin, Bruce Nauman, Allen Ruppersberg.
