= John Lohmar House =

Historic house in Minnesota, United States

- U.S. National Register of Historic Places
- Minneapolis Landmark
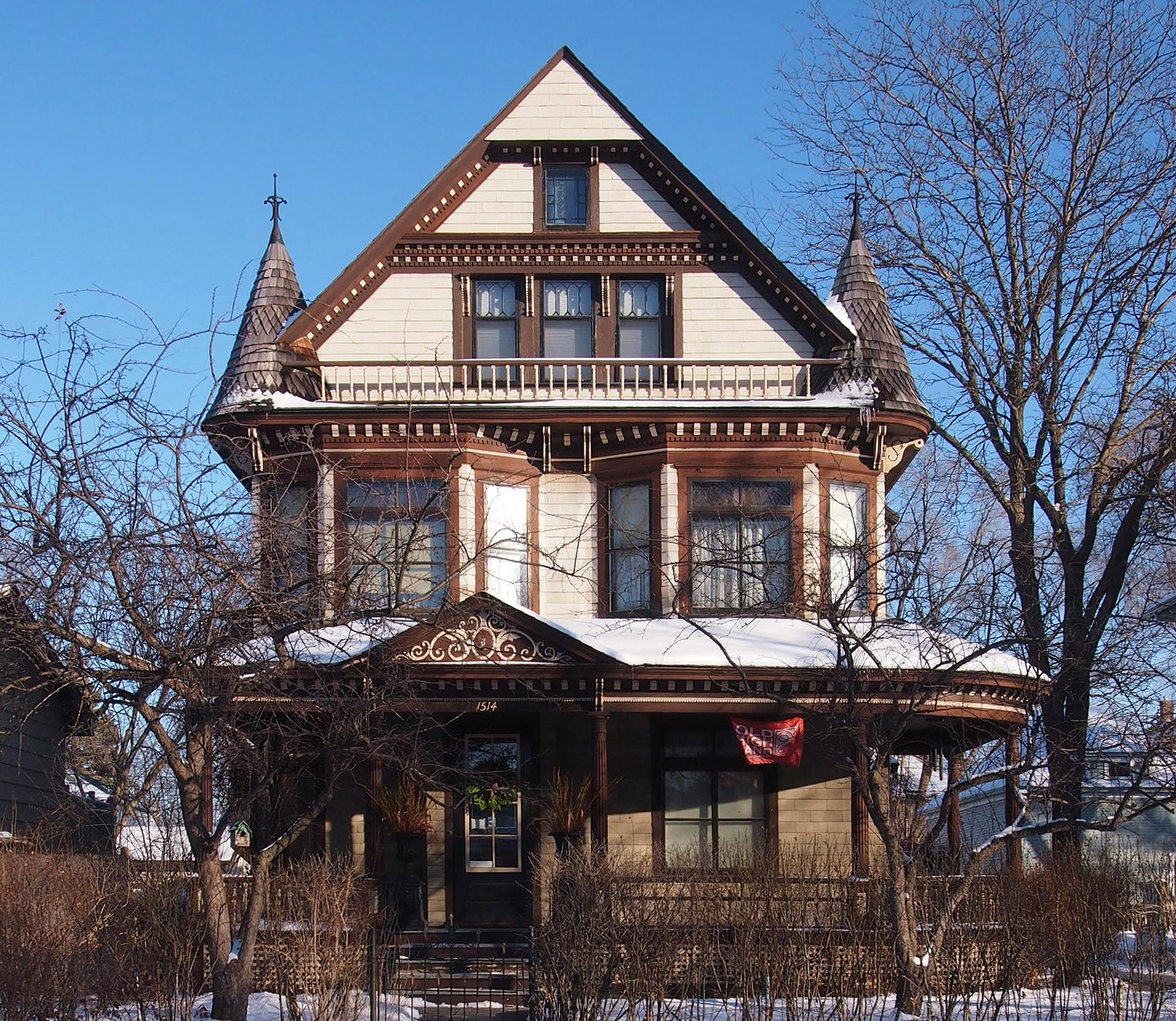
- The John Lohmar House from the west

- Location within Minnesota Location within the United States
- Location: 1514 Dupont Avenue North, Minneapolis, Minnesota
- Coordinates: 44°59′41.3″N 93°17′32.3″W
- Built: 1898
- Architect: Peter Jeub
- Architectural style: Queen Anne
- NRHP reference No.: 77000742

Significant dates
- Added to NRHP: April 18, 1977
- Designated MPLSL: 1983

The John Lohmar House is a historic house in the Near North neighborhood of Minneapolis, Minnesota, United States. It has several features common to Queen Anne style architecture, such as a wraparound Doric colonnade porch, a knob and spindle balustrade, and a bracketed cornice. Its owner, John Lohmar, was a merchant and milliner of German ancestry. Descendants of the original owner lived in the house until 1971 and preserved its original appearance as a single-family house. The house is listed on the National Register of Historic Places.
