= Inner Search =

Steel sculpture in Minneapolis, Minnesota

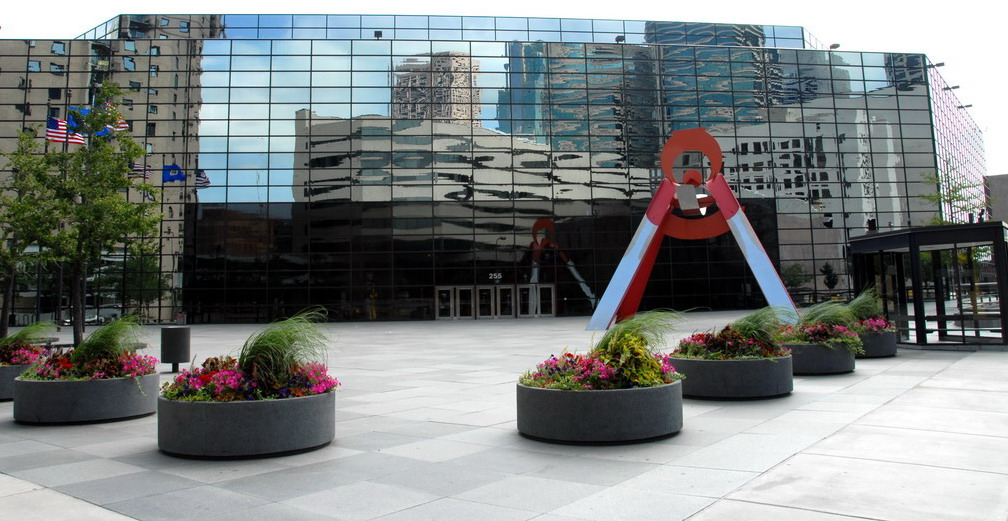
- The sculpture in front of the Wells Fargo Operations Center in 2006
- Interactive map of Inner Search
- Location: Wells Fargo Operations Center, Minneapolis, Minnesota, United States
- Coordinates: 44°58′48″N 93°15′57″W
- Designer: Mark di Suvero
- Type: Steel sculpture
- Material: COR-TEN steel, stainless steel
- Height: 30 ft (9.1 m)
- Beginning date: c. 1979
- Opening date: August 27, 1980
- Dismantled date: August 2022

Inner Search is a pyramidal welded steel sculpture designed by American artist Mark di Suvero, for an exterior plaza outside the Wells Fargo Operations Center in Downtown West, Minneapolis. Constructed on-site at the corner of 2nd Avenue and 3rd Street in 1980, the 30-foot tall sculpture consists of two bent, bisecting I-beams, utilizing COR-TEN steel and stainless steel. The general public was encouraged to watch di Suvero weld the sculpture together. A dedication ceremony occurred on August 27, 1980, where di Suvero received a standing ovation from bank employees. The sculpture's design was reportedly inspired by symbols on the United States one-dollar bill.

When the adjacent building's namesake changed from Northwestern National Bank to Wells Fargo, the originally yellow Inner Search was painted red. It was later dismantled and removed from the site in August 2022, a month ahead of news that the Wells Fargo Operations Center would be demolished for a new mixed-use development. As a result, Inner Search now resides in a storage facility managed by the bank.

== Description and history ==
Inner Search is a pyramidal steel sculpture consisting of two bisecting, bent I-beams. California artist Mark di Suvero was first commissioned for the project in October 1979 by Northwestern National Bank to construct a 30 to 40 foot sculpture on the plaza outside their new Operations Center in Downtown West, Minneapolis. He was selected at the suggestion of consulting firm Kathy Lucoff Fine Arts by a committee of representatives from the bank and Peterson, Clark & Associates, the project's architect. He received US$225,000 as his commission. His design efforts began in 1979, followed by site visits throughout 1980 during different seasons. According to the Minneapolis Star, during his trips, di Suvero loved the Operations Center design but was not impressed by the adjacent structures under construction. He welded the beams together on-site, and, in order not to damage Third Street's pavement, rested them atop steel plates. A hydraulic elevator was used for di Suvero to access portions of the positioned steel during welding. The finished work was approximately 30 feet tall, not utilizing a small portion of the 10 tons worth of raw material. The leftover steel from the project was donated to students at the Minneapolis College of Art and Design. A combination of COR-TEN steel and stainless steel was used to create the piece, which was originally painted yellow, before becoming red when the building's owner became Wells Fargo.

Inner Search was housed outside of the Wells Fargo Operations Center (shown) from 1980 to 2022.

Inner Search was dedicated at 11:30 a.m. August 27, 1980. It became the largest public sculpture in the city. John Morrison, then-chief officer of Northwestern National Bank, hosted a luncheon in di Suvero's honor at the employee dining facilities of the new Operations Center. Attendees provided the sculptor a standing ovation upon his entry. Design elements of Inner Search included a shape that, when giving off the sun's reflection, would create a warmer surrounding environment, which du Suvero said would be warm and cozy. Visitors to the sculpture's dedication felt its top resembled the Freemasonry symbol. According to Martin Friedman, di Suvero's friend and former director of the nearby Walker Art Center, the sculpture was inspired by the eye and pyramid features on the United States one-dollar bill. The Minneapolis Tribune felt Inner Search and di Suvero made artistic references to the Italian Renaissance.

It was later removed from the property in August 2022, and transported to an unnamed Wells Fargo-owned storage facility. Regarding the sculpture's future, a spokesperson for the bank remarked: "we're reviewing long-term plans for it." During that same time frame, developer Sherman Associates, who had recently acquired the Wells Fargo Operations Center, announced plans to demolish the building and replace it with a mixed-use development. The project planned to take over the site of the sculpture, Harmonia, is expected to complete construction by 2026.

== Reception ==
A view of the Wells Fargo Operations Center plaza following the removal of Inner Search, as pictured in August 2023, without the sculpture.

During its creation, the public was welcomed to watch di Suvero construct the sculpture together outside the Northwestern National Bank Operations Center plaza. In August 1980, spectators watched welding and the placement of the beams via two cranes. Barbara Flanagan from the Minneapolis Star recommended to her readers the viewing of the construction, calling it the "liveliest [show] in town". Museum director Samuel Sachs II said of the sculpture: "[it fulfills] the universal human need for spiritual and aesthetic expression". The Minneapolis Tribune also provided a positive review, claiming the city was lucky to be its home and writing of its dedication ceremony: "One got the feeling that had there been any members of the House of Medici present, they would have certainly nodded their approval [...] They would have liked it that the bank had chosen an internationally famous sculptor who has about him the robust air of the artist-statesman so familiar to that Renaissance dynasty." Inner Search received criticism, however, from the same publication's columnist Don Morrison, who noted its "busy sterility" and considered it inferior to other works by di Suvero.

Following the sculpture's removal in 2022, the Star Tribune's James Lileks reported that few were likely to notice its absence. He revealed that, in 1980, a large sculpture of a "quintessential Minnesota babushka" was also suggested for display as public art in Minneapolis, and classified Inner Search as the "more sophisticated" choice.

== See also ==
- 1980 in art
- List of public art in Minneapolis
