= Minneapolis Sculpture Garden =

American sculpture garden

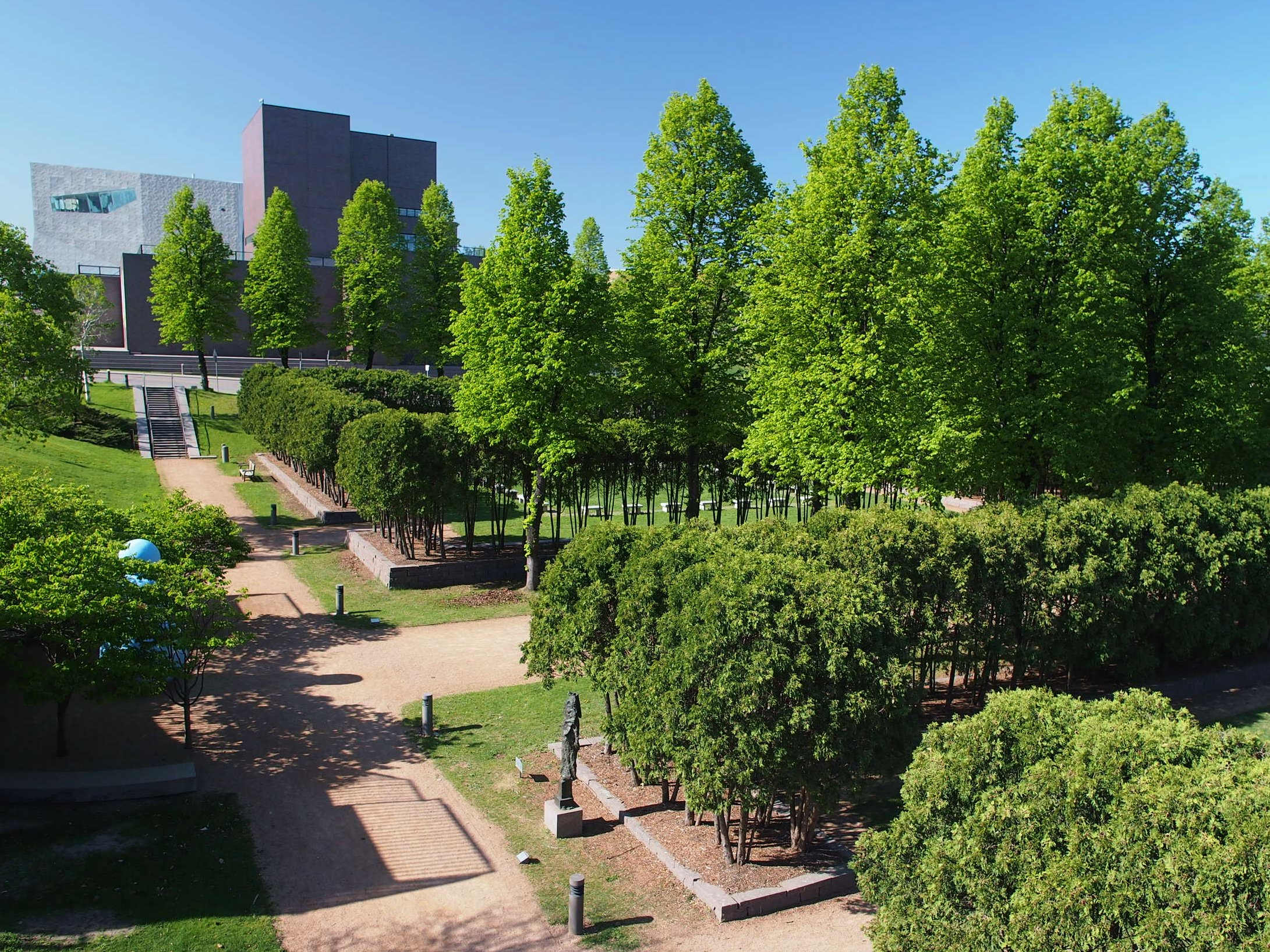
- Interactive map of Minneapolis Sculpture Garden
- Type: Sculpture park
- Location: Minneapolis, Minnesota, United States
- Coordinates: 44°58′13″N 93°17′20″W
- Area: 11 acres (4.5 ha)
- Created: 1988
- Operator: Walker Art Center, Minneapolis Park and Recreation Board

The Minneapolis Sculpture Garden is an 11-acre (4.5 ha) park in Minneapolis, Minnesota, in the United States. It is located north of the Walker Art Center, which operates it in coordination with the Minneapolis Park and Recreation Board. It reopened on June 10, 2017, after a reconstruction that resulted in the Walker Art Center and Sculpture Garden being unified into one 19-acre campus. It is one of the largest urban sculpture gardens in the United States, with 40 permanent art installations and several other pieces that are moved in and out periodically.

The park is located to the west of Loring Park and the Basilica of Saint Mary. The land was first purchased by the park board around the start of the 20th century, when it was known as "The Parade" because it had been used for military drills. It became known as the Armory Gardens after park superintendent Theodore Wirth created a formal design that included a U.S. National Guard armory (Kenwood Armory) for Spanish War volunteers.

Working as a civic and cultural center, in 1913 a floral convention transformed the land into floral gardens, which it remained for the next 50 years. In 1934, six years after the Walker Art Gallery opened across the street, the Armory was demolished for its instability, and a new Armory built in downtown Minneapolis, turning the Armory Gardens over to the Minneapolis Park Board. Since 1908 the area of today's Sculpture Garden and land to the west had been used for sport recreation via mildly-improved playing fields and the 1950 construction of the original Parade Stadium. In 1988, the Minneapolis Sculpture Garden opened, designed by Edward Larrabee Barnes and landscape architects Quinnel and Rothschild. Parade Stadium was demolished in 1990, two years later the Garden was expanded, adding 3.5 acres (1.4 ha). Michael Van Valkenburgh and Associates, Inc. designed the northward extension to complement the original space with a more open area that features a walkway and the 300-foot-long (91 m) Alene Grossman Memorial Arbor.

The centerpiece of the garden is the Spoonbridge and Cherry (1985–1988) fountain designed by husband and wife Claes Oldenburg and Coosje van Bruggen.

The Irene Hixon Whitney Bridge (1988), designed by Siah Armajani, crosses Hennepin Avenue and I-94, connecting the sculpture garden with Loring Park for pedestrians. The bridge was restored in 2018 when MnDOT replaced the wooden deck, repainted the bridge, and replaced the John Ashbery poem that stretches across the bridge beams in metal letters with new letters. The bridge was repainted in consultation with Armajani to ensure the colors met his original design. The renovation included lights on the bridge that were part of the original design but not initially installed. Walker Art Center staff joke that the Ashbery untitled poem, which was commissioned for the bridge, is the "longest poem in the world" since the bridge stretches over 16 lanes of interstate traffic for 375 feet.

In 2016 and 2017, the garden was reconstructed to provide more sustainable water management in an area that was previously a marsh. A water collection tank was installed near Spoonbridge and Cherry to provide water for the garden and adjacent ball fields. Other improvements were made, including narrowing Vineland Place between the Walker Art Center and the garden and providing upgraded restroom facilities. The Walker added 18 new art works to the garden after this reconstruction, including a site-specific commission from Theaster Gates in his first permanent outdoor sculpture, Black Vessel for a Saint.

== Notable installations ==
- Spoonbridge and Cherry (Claes Oldenburg and Coosje van Bruggen)
- Hahn/Cock (Katharina Fritsch)
- Wind Chime (Pierre Huyghe)
- Shadows at the Crossroads (Seitu Jones, Ta-coumba Aiken, Soyini Guyton)
- Okciyapi (Help Each Other) (Angela Two Stars)

== Gallery ==
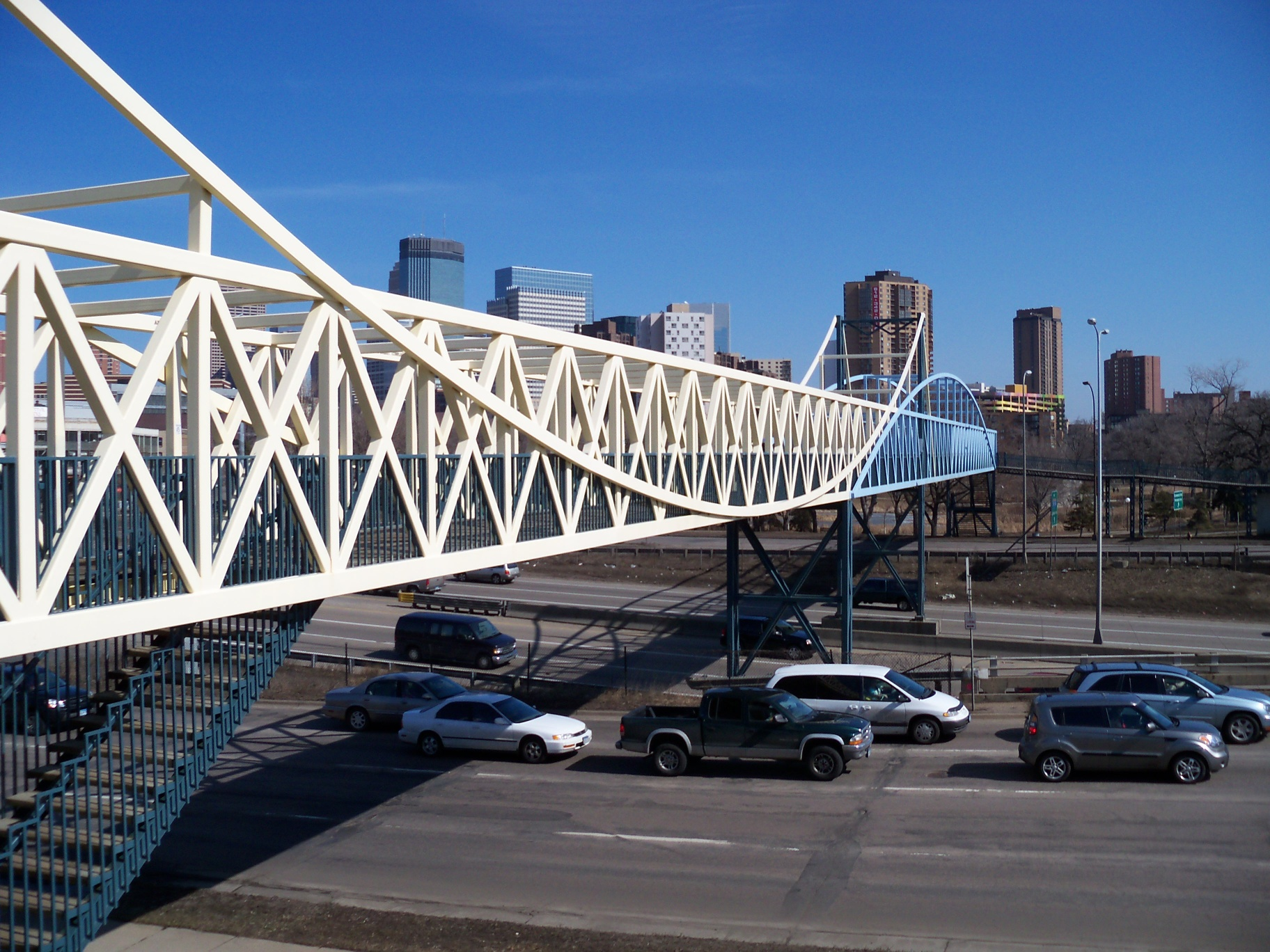
Irene Hixon Whitney Bridge

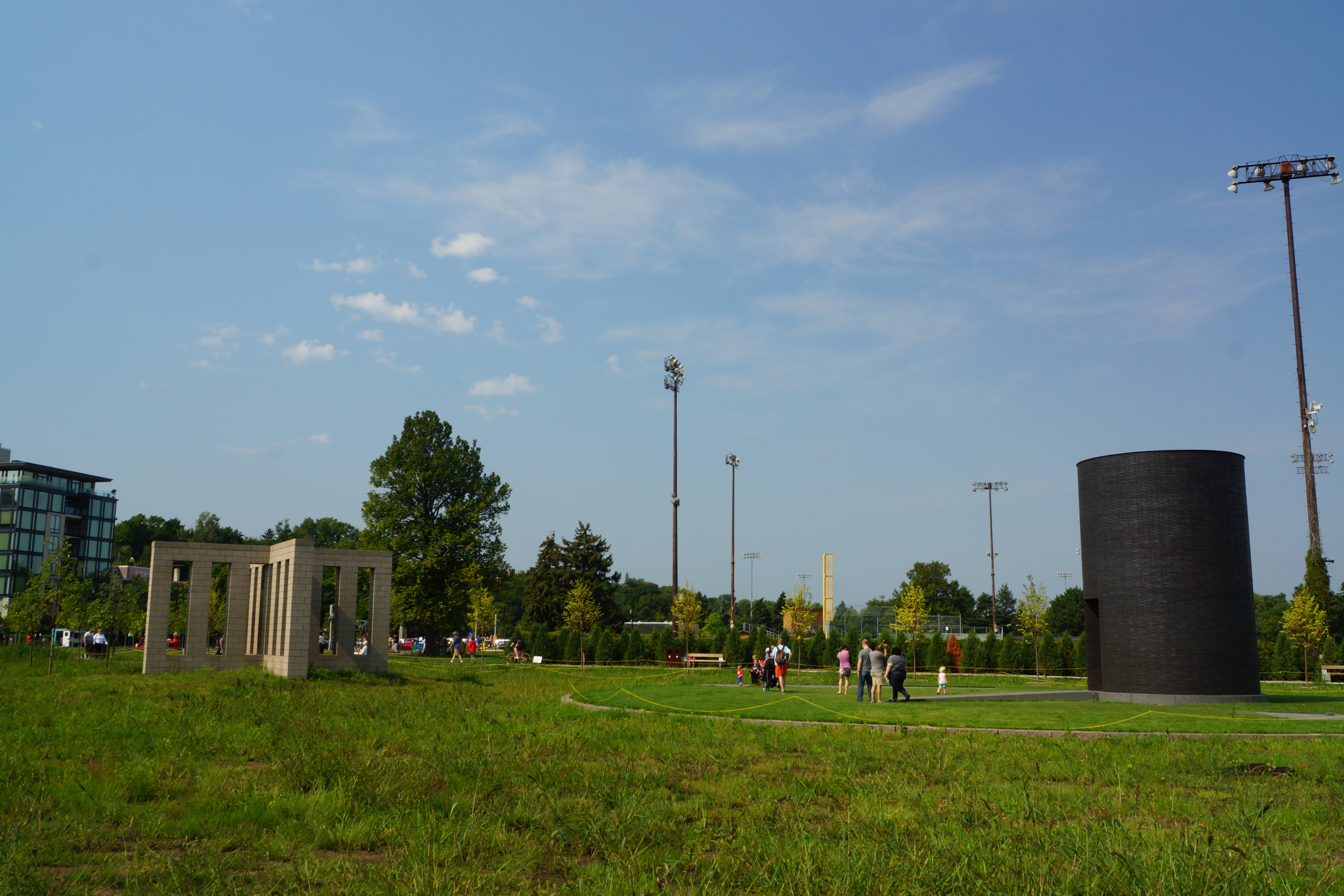
Theaster Gates, Black Vessel for a Saint, 2017

Kenwood Armory and Gardens

Kenwood Armory after remodel ca. 1919

Kenwood Armory before remodel ca. 1910
