= Sumner-Glenwood, Minneapolis =

Coordinates: 44.9841°N 93.2908°W

Sumner-Glenwood Heritage Park
- Neighborhood
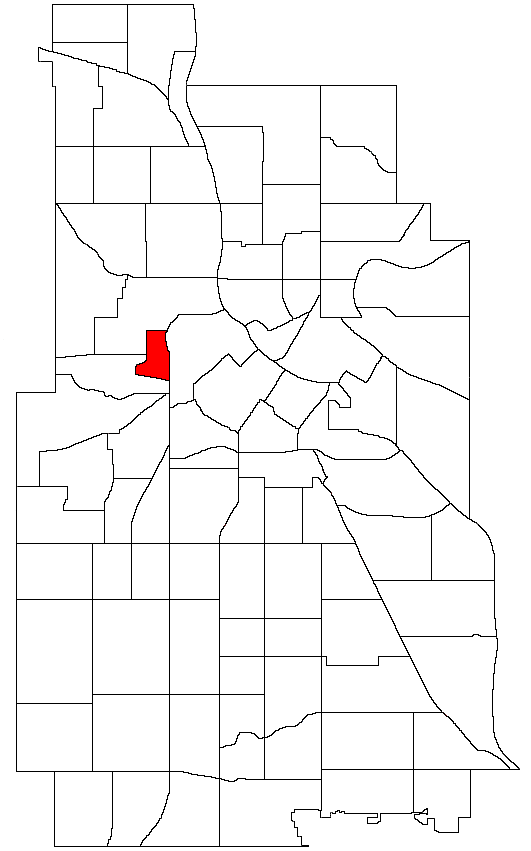
- Location of Sumner-Glenwood within the U.S. city of Minneapolis
- Interactive map of Sumner-Glenwood
- Country: United States
- State: Minnesota
- County: Hennepin
- City: Minneapolis
- Community: Near North
- City Council Ward: 5

Government
  - Council Member: Pearll Warren

Area
  - Total: 0.22 sq mi (0.57 km^{2})

Population (2020)
  - Total: 2,003
  - Density: 9,100/sq mi (3,500/km^{2})
- Time zone: UTC-6 (CST)
  - Summer (DST): UTC-5 (CDT)
- ZIP code: 55411
- Area code: 612

Historical population
Census	Pop.	Note	%±
1980	2,095		—
1990	3,336		59.2%
2000	144		−95.7%
2010	1,637		1,036.8%
2020	2,003		22.4%

Sumner-Glenwood is a neighborhood in the Near North community of Minneapolis. The neighborhood is roughly contained by 15 city blocks bordered to the north by 11th Avenue North, to the south by Glenwood Avenue, to the east by Interstate 94, and to the west by both Girard Terrace and Emerson Avenue North. It is located in ward 5 of the Minneapolis City Council and state legislative district 59B. The neighborhood includes the Heritage Park mixed-use area.

== Demographics ==
Prior to 1998, the neighborhood had 3,336 residents. 66% were Asian, Hmong, Native Hawaiian or other Pacific Islander, 29% were Black, and 5% were White. Almost all of these people lived in public housing. Most notably was the Hmong community, many of whom resided in Sumner-Glenwood in the late 1980s up until the demolition of the housing projects.

As of 2020, the population of Sumner-Glenwood was 2,768, split 46.8% male and 53.2% female 81.5% of residents were at least a high school graduate (or equivalent).

20.1% of the population were foreign-born residents, and 40.3% spoke a language other than English at home. 18.2% of residents spoke English less than "very well

28.0% of households had no access to a vehicle. Among workers 16 years and older, 84.8% commuted to work via car. The medium household income in Sumner-Glenwood was $39,609. 30.2% of residents lived below the poverty line. 62.9% of housing in the neighborhood was renter-occupied.

Race/ethnicity
Race/ethnicity	2000		2010		2020	
Race/ethnicity	Number	%	Number	%	Number	%
White alone	13	9.03	205	13.90	231	12.15
Black alone	58	40.28	1,046	70.92	1,493	78.54
Hispanic or Latino (any race)	9	6.25	49	3.32	45	2.37
Native American alone	1	0.69	14	0.95	15	0.79
Asian alone	62	43.06	106	7.16	47	2.47
Other race alone	0	0.00	4	0.27	4	0.21
Pacific Islander alone	0	0.00	0	0.00	1	0.05
Two or more races	1	0.69	51	3.46	65	3.42
Total	144	100.0	1,475	100.0	1,901	100.0

== History ==
The Sumner Field Homes, constructed by the WPA in 1938, were the first federally subsidized homes in Minnesota. The homes were demolished in 1998, along with high-rise project housing buildings constructed in the 1960s and 1970s. According to the US Census (1), the area experienced a 95.7% population loss from 3,336 in 1990 to 144 in 2000. Plans were made to rebuild the area, re-incorporating it into surrounding street grids. Buildings following the "New Urbanism" style replaced the old project housing, with both affordable and market-rate units.

The new community, developed by McCormack Baron Salazar, was funded with HOPE VI grants. It was renamed Heritage Park, and includes mixed-income rental and owned units. One of the new streets in this development, Van White Memorial Boulevard, is named for Van Freeman White, the first African-American to serve on the Minneapolis City Council.

In addition to mixed-income rentals, the Heritage Park Master Association represents the owners of single-family houses, townhouses, and condominiums in the neighborhood.
