= Van Freeman White =

American politician

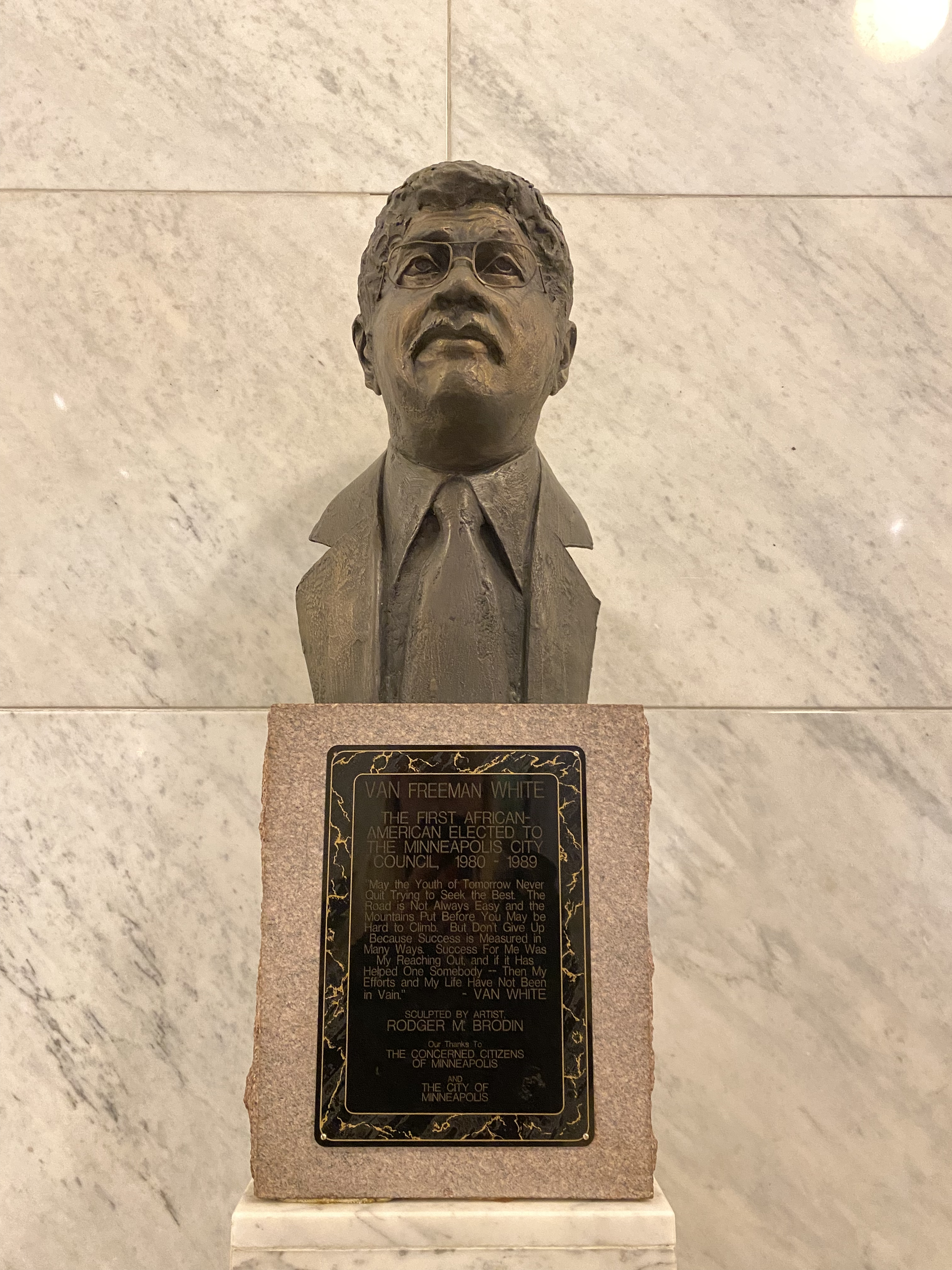
- Bust of Van White at Minneapolis City Hall

Alderman of the Minneapolis City Council from Ward 5
- In office 1980–1989
- Succeeded by: Jackie Cherryhomes

Personal details
- Born: August 2, 1924
- Died: July 14, 1993
- Political party: Democratic (DFL)
- Spouse: Javanese White
- Children: 2

Van Freeman White (August 2, 1924 – July 14, 1993) was a politician from Minneapolis, Minnesota. He was the first African-American to be elected to the Minneapolis City Council, serving from 1980–1989.

== Life and career ==
White was born in North Minneapolis in 1924. His father died when he was 10 years old leaving him, the eldest of his five siblings, responsible to help take care of the family. He attended Camden High School, graduating in 1943 and later working in construction. White married his wife Javanese White in 1955 and had 2 children: son Perri White and daughter Javoni White. Before going into politics, White worked with the Minnesota Department of Economic Security. He also became involved with several North Minneapolis community organizations; in 1971, he founded the Willard Homewood Organization in Willard-Hay.

White won a city council seat in 1979, in a race guaranteed to elect the city's first Black alderman. He encouraged commercial development in his North Minneapolis ward and also supported new housing developments, parks and school buildings. White died in 1993 at his home in North Minneapolis.

Van White Memorial Boulevard, a street in Minneapolis's Near North community, is named in his honor.
