= Cottontail on the Trail =

Sculpture in Minneapolis, Minnesota, US

- The sculpture adorned with a mask in March 2020 during the COVID-19 pandemic
- Artist: Jeff Barber
- Year: 2002
- Medium: Bronze sculpture
- Dimensions: 1.8 m × 2.7 m (6 ft × 9 ft)
- Location: Minneapolis, Minnesota, United States; 44°54′44.2″N 93°16′01.8″W

Cottontail on the Trail (nicknamed the "Minnehaha Bunny") is a bronze sculpture in Minneapolis, Minnesota, United States. The piece was commissioned as part of the city's Art in Public Places program and was designed by sculptor Jeff Barber. The sculpture, which depicts an oddly proportioned cottontail rabbit, was permanently installed on Minnehaha Parkway in 2002. Cottontail on the Trail has been well received by residents of the surrounding area, who often decorate it seasonally or in response to current events.

== History ==
In the late 1990s, the city of Minneapolis sought public input for several neighborhood "gateway art projects" to be installed throughout the city through its Art in Public Places program. City councilmember Scott Benson, who was at the time the Hale, Page and Diamond Lake Community Association's president, recalled that members of the community sought art "that would represent the beauty of the neighborhood [and] capture our appreciation for nature." Benson also stated that people desired art that was whimsical.

Proposals from artists were solicited. An artwork depicting Native Americans and an outdoor living room were among those considered. Cannon Falls-based sculptor Jeff Barber won the selection process with his proposal for Cottontail on the Trail, for which the city paid $50,000, a combination of public money and donations. Barber worked intermittently on the sculpture for two years before it was installed via crane in September 2002. The piece was dedicated on November 23 of that year.

== Design ==
Cottontail on the Trail is a bronze sculpture depicting an oddly proportioned cottontail rabbit. It measures nine feet (2.7 m) long and six feet (1.8 m) high and weighs 1,500 pounds (680 kg). It is displayed surrounded by red mulch along Minnehaha Parkway near its intersection with Portland Avenue South.

The piece is atypical of Barber's style, which typically tends to be more abstract. Barber said that "The general rule of thumb when it comes to the taste of the American public is that they want to recognize what they're looking at" and took inspiration for the piece from the whimsy sought by community members in the input process.

== Reception ==
Writer Andy Sturdevant described Cottontail on the Trail as "probably the best-known piece of art" along Minnehaha Creek between Lake Harriet and Minnehaha Falls. Local paper City Pages listed the sculpture as the best landmark in the Minneapolis–Saint Paul metropolitan area in 2019, writing that the piece "isn't glitzy or challenging—it's just a big-ass bunny that reliably brings smiles to passersby."

A 2014 survey by Minneapolis's Community Planning and Economic Development department found that 53 percent of the 58 respondents felt that the sculpture was connected to the community in which it was situated and over 80 percent said the piece contributed to the surrounding area. Of those surveyed, 40 percent identified it as a contributing factor in their decision to pass by that particular location on that day. Many respondents considered Cottontail on the Trail to be iconic and said the work served as a gathering space for the community.

The sculpture has garnered the nickname of the "Minnehaha Bunny" from residents. Children often climb on the sculpture and people who live nearby have frequently costumed and decorated it based on seasonal occasions or topical events such as leaving eggs by the sculpture during Easter or cladding the mouth of the sculpture with a large cloth face mask during the COVID-19 pandemic.

== See also ==
- List of public art in Minneapolis
- Rabbits and hares in art
