= Jordan, Minneapolis =

Neighborhood in Minneapolis

Coordinates: 45.0060°N 93.3022°W

Jordan
- Neighborhood
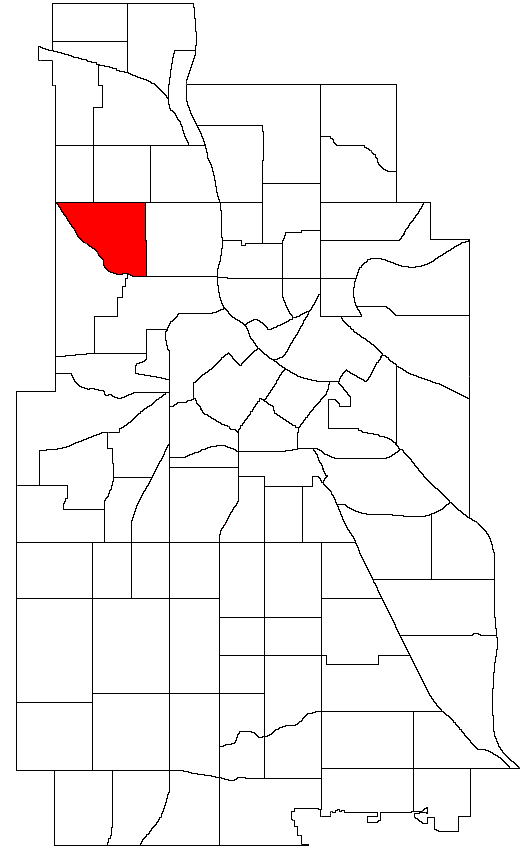
- Location of Jordan within the U.S. city of Minneapolis
- Interactive map of Jordan
- Country: United States
- State: Minnesota
- County: Hennepin
- City: Minneapolis
- Community: Near North
- Founded: 1849
- City Council wards: 4, 5

Government
  - Council member: LaTrisha Vetaw
  - Council member: Pearll Warren

Area
  - Total: 0.772 sq mi (2.00 km^{2})

Population (2020)
  - Total: 8,548
  - Density: 11,100/sq mi (4,280/km^{2})
- Time zone: UTC-6 (CST)
  - Summer (DST): UTC-5 (CDT)
- ZIP code: 55411
- Area code: 612

Historical population
Census	Pop.	Note	%±
1980	7,861		—
1990	7,737		−1.6%
2000	9,149		18.2%
2010	7,360		−19.6%
2020	8,548		16.1%

Jordan is a neighborhood in the Near North community in Minneapolis. Its boundaries are Lowry Avenue North to the north, Emerson Avenue North to the east, and West Broadway to the south and west.

It is primarily located in city council ward 5, though a small portion west of Queen Avenue N is in ward 4. In the Minnesota Legislature, Jordan is in district 59A.

== History ==
The neighborhood is named after Jordan Junior High, which in turn was named after Charles Jordan, the former superintendent of the Minneapolis Public Schools. The school was built in 1922 and demolished in 1985. Jordan Park sits on the former school location.

== Demographics ==
Race/ethnicity
Race/ethnicity	2000		2010		2020	
Race/ethnicity	Number	%	Number	%	Number	%
White alone	2,053	22.44	1,325	18.00	1,428	16.71
Black alone	4,476	48.92	3,595	48.85	3,982	46.58
Hispanic or Latino (any race)	386	4.22	611	8.30	1,139	13.32
Native American alone	153	1.67	89	1.21	145	1.70
Asian alone	1,568	17.14	1,353	18.38	1,275	14.92
Other race alone	18	0.20	24	0.33	72	0.84
Pacific Islander alone	16	0.17	1	0.01	4	0.05
Two or more races	479	5.24	362	4.92	503	5.88
Total	9,149	100.0	7,360	100.0	8,548	100.0

== Jordan Area Community Council ==
Jordan Area Community Council was originally established in 1964, and was designated as a 501 (c) 3 non-profit organization in 1965. The Jordan Area Community Council was initially established by residents organizing in the Jordan neighborhood to prevent the closure of the North Branch Public Library.

The Jordan Area Community Council is led by a Board of Directors made up of Jordan neighborhood residents. They are funded by donors, foundational grant funds, as well as State and Federal grant funds.

The Jordan Area Community Council works on active community engagement, advocacy, and holds events for residents on a monthly basis. They send out an online newsletter monthly. Jordan Area Community Council distributes everyday, essential items to residents who need them, such as food, clothing items, diapers, and first aid kits.

== See also ==
- Jordan, Minnesota
