= Shadows at the Crossroads =

Collection of seven sculptures

Shadows at the Crossroads is a collection of seven sculptures created by Twin-Cities based artists, Ta-Coumba T.Aiken, and Seitu Jones, as commissioned for the Minneapolis Sculpture Garden. On display since 2019, the works depict historically prominent and influential Minnesotan figures. The collection is a revival and continuation of a previous collaboration by the respective artists, titled "Shadows of Spirit," which was commissioned for the Nicollet Mall situated in downtown Minneapolis in 1992. It was funded by the T.B. Walker Fund, 2019. Thomas Barlow Walker founded the Walker Arts Center in 1927, which, in partnership with the Minneapolis Park and Recreation Board, manages the Minneapolis Sculpture Garden where the collection is housed.

== Subjects and medium ==
=== Medium and processes ===
The silhouettes are modelled and cast from tracings of Minneapolis residents taken at different times of the day to diversify the depth and cast of the shadows. The majority of the sculptures feature poems by Rosemary Soyini Vinelle Guyton that relate to the figures represented. There are two exceptions: these being the shadows honouring the late Kirk Washington Jr, which instead features an extract from his contribution to "One Minneapolis: a City in Verse," and Siah Armajani, which has been left blank at his request. Four of the shadows were cast in molten bronze using foam board moulds. This was executed in collaboration with the Anurag Art Foundry in Stillwater, Minnesota. The moulds were surfaced with millet to create a textured overlay, increasing the surface grit of the collection for the comfort of visitors. The sculptures dedicated to The Walker Art Center Teen Arts Council and Siah Aramajani are instead carved into the concrete ground directly. Finally, Kirk Washington Jr's dedicated sculpture is crafted from a water-resistant material, meaning it is visible only when the surrounding concrete is saturated. This distinct material choice has been said to pay direct tribute to his artistic exploration and representation of race and marginalisation.

=== Subjects featured ===
- Eliza Winston
- Harriet Robinson Scott
- Kirk Washington Jr.
- Maḣpiya Wic̣aṡṭa
- Siah Armajani
- "Time" for the members of the Walker Art Center Teen Arts Council (WACTAC)
- "Untitled" (child)
