= Harrison, Minneapolis =

Coordinates: 44.9814°N 93.3031°W

Harrison
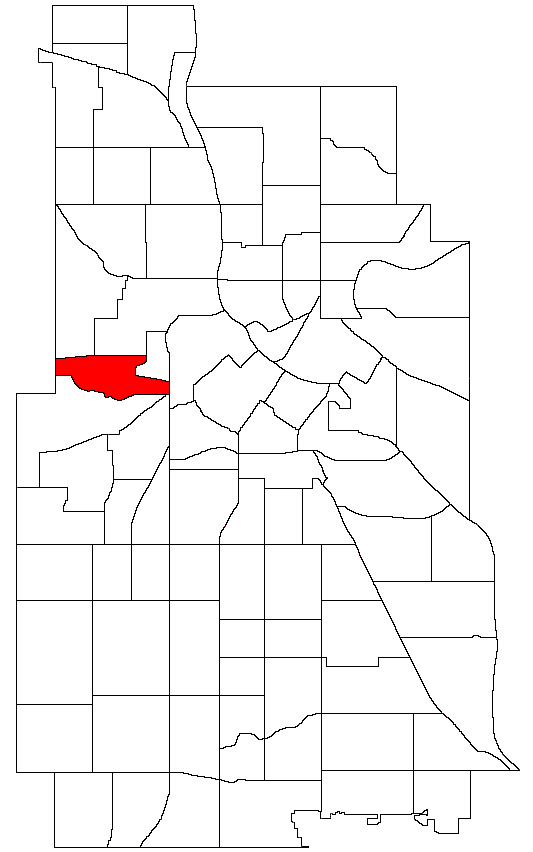
- Location of Harrison within the U.S. city of Minneapolis
- Interactive map of Harrison
- Country: United States
- State: Minnesota
- County: Hennepin
- City: Minneapolis
- Community: Near North
- City Council ward: 5

Government
  - Council member: Pearll Warren

Area
  - Total: 0.522 sq mi (1.35 km^{2})

Population (2020)
  - Total: 3,245
  - Density: 6,220/sq mi (2,400/km^{2})
- Time zone: UTC-6 (CST)
  - Summer (DST): UTC-5 (CDT)
- ZIP code: 55405
- Area code: 612

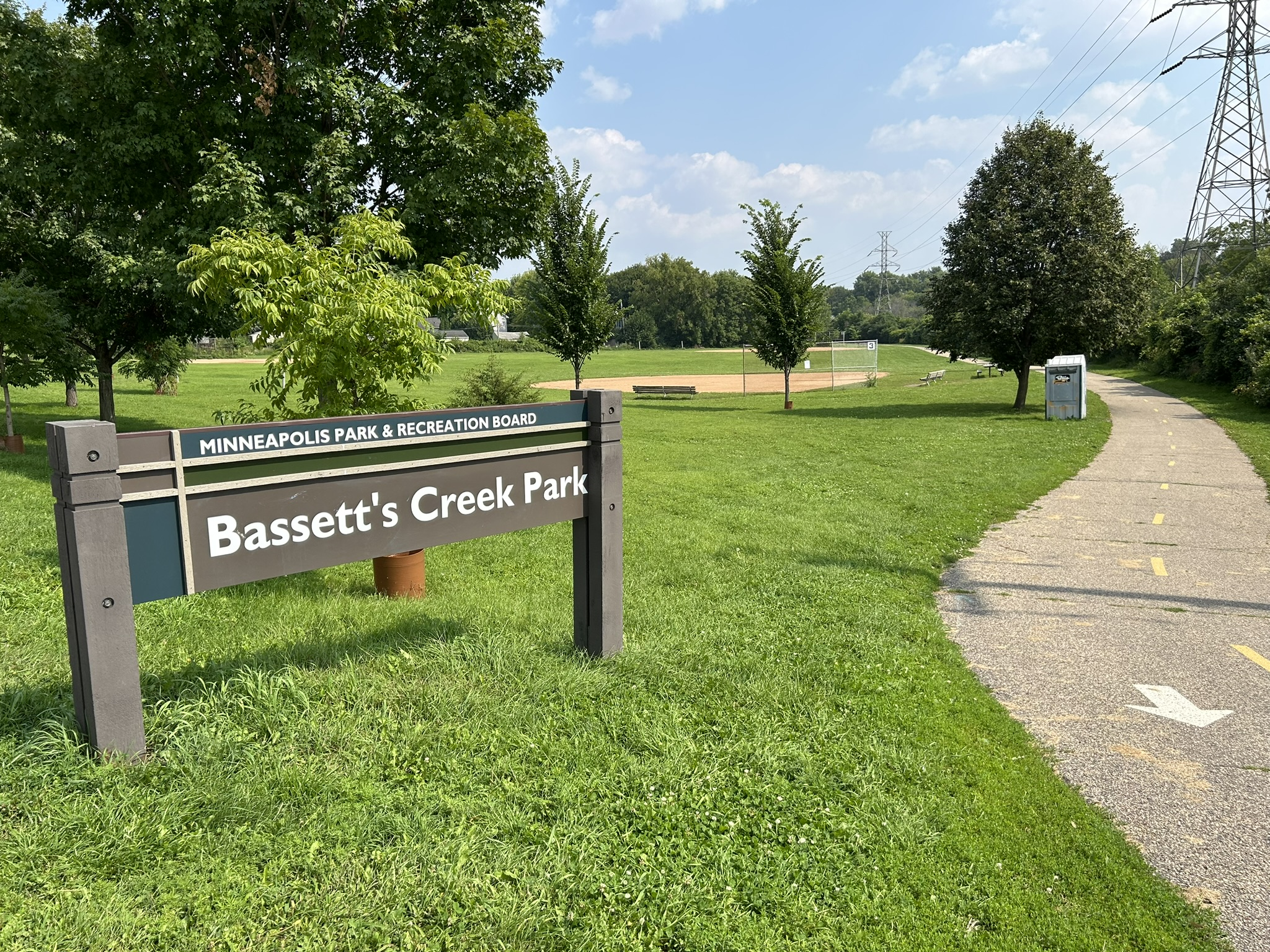
Entrance to Bassett's Creek Park on the southwest side of the Harrison Neighborhood in Minneapolis, Minnesota.

Historical population
Census	Pop.	Note	%±
1980	3,140		—
1990	3,536		12.6%
2000	4,156		17.5%
2010	3,211		−22.7%
2020	3,245		1.1%

Harrison is a neighborhood in the Near North community in the U.S. city of Minneapolis, located to the west of downtown. Its boundaries are roughly, Olson Memorial Highway to the north, Lyndale Avenue to the east, Bassett Creek to the south, and Theodore Wirth Park to the west. It is located in Minneapolis City Council ward 5 and state legislative districts 59B and 63B.

== Demographics ==
Race/ethnicity
Race/ethnicity	2000		2010		2020	
Race/ethnicity	Number	%	Number	%	Number	%
White alone	934	22.50	928	28.90	1,128	34.76
Black alone	1,598	38.49	1,272	39.61	1,257	38.74
Hispanic or Latino (any race)	213	5.13	293	9.12	346	10.66
Native American alone	53	1.28	38	1.18	30	0.92
Asian alone	1,101	26.52	552	17.19	261	8.04
Other race alone	15	0.36	9	0.28	12	0.37
Pacific Islander alone	3	0.07	3	0.09	5	0.15
Two or more races	235	5.66	116	3.61	206	6.35
Total	4,152	100.0	3,211	100.0	3,245	100.0

== Notable residents ==
In the 1970s the musician Prince lived as a child in two homes in the Harrison Neighborhood, at 1707 Glenwood Avenue and 539 Newton Avenue North.
