= Hawthorne, Minneapolis =

Coordinates: 45.0065°N 93.2871°W

Hawthorne
- Neighborhood
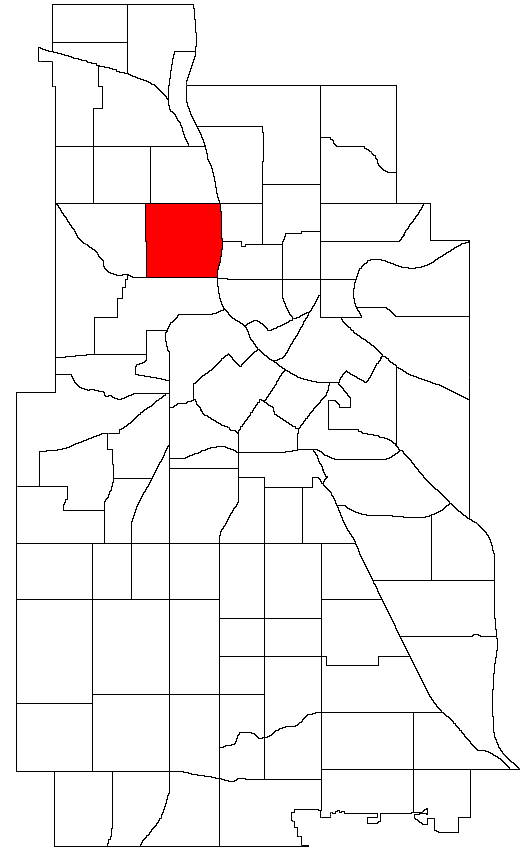
- Location of Hawthorne within the U.S. city of Minneapolis
- Interactive map of Hawthorne
- Country: United States
- State: Minnesota
- County: Hennepin
- City: Minneapolis
- Community: Near North
- City Council ward: 5

Government
  - Council member: Pearll Warren

Area
  - Total: 0.882 sq mi (2.28 km^{2})

Population (2020)
  - Total: 5,608
  - Density: 6,360/sq mi (2,450/km^{2})
- Time zone: UTC-6 (CST)
  - Summer (DST): UTC-5 (CDT)
- ZIP code: 55411
- Area code: 612

Hawthorne is a neighborhood in the Near North community in Minneapolis. Its boundaries are Lowry Avenue North to the north, the Mississippi River to the east, West Broadway to the south, and Emerson Avenue North to the west. It is located in Ward 5 of the city council and state legislative district 59A. The neighborhood is named in honor of 19th Century American author Nathaniel Hawthorne.

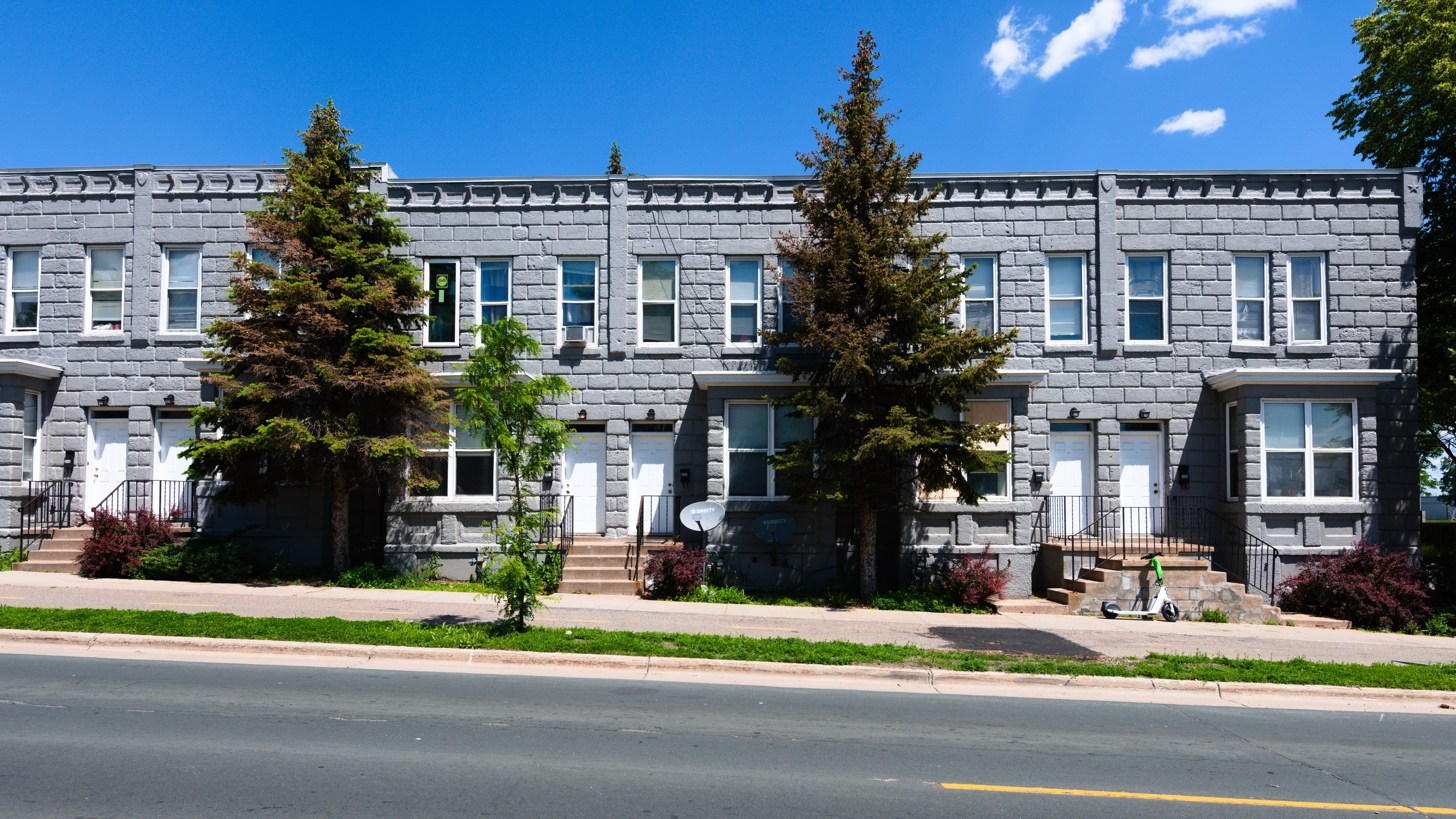
A series of row houses in Hawthorne

== Demographics ==
Historical population
Census	Pop.	Note	%±
1980	6,036		—
1990	6,032		−0.1%
2000	5,985		−0.8%
2010	4,567		−23.7%
2020	5,608		22.8%

Based on Census 2000 figures, the neighborhood's ethnic makeup changed significantly between 1980 and 2000. All ethnic groups except whites and American Indians increased in number. The white population dropped from 85 percent of the population in 1980 to 19 percent in 2000. During that same time period, the black population increased from 5 percent to 50 percent, and the Asian population grew from less than 1 percent to 17 percent.

The Census 2000 also indicated that children and adolescents increased by almost 30 percent, and the school-age population in particular (5 to 17 years old) grew by 93 percent. In 2000, Hawthorne saw nearly 3 percent fewer adults and 60 percent fewer senior residents than in 1980. As a result, the total population decreased slightly. The neighborhood has an average of 3.4 people living in each house in Hawthorne. The median income is $21,865 per year.

Race/ethnicity
Race/ethnicity	2000		2010		2020	
Race/ethnicity	Number	%	Number	%	Number	%
White alone	1,189	18.77	738	16.16	867	15.42
Black alone	3,172	50.09	2,198	48.13	2,807	49.94
Hispanic or Latino (any race)	339	5.35	404	8.85	712	12.67
Native American alone	143	2.26	69	1.51	113	2.01
Asian alone	1,069	16.88	861	18.85	759	13.50
Other race alone	31	0.49	20	0.44	31	0.55
Pacific Islander alone	0	0.00	0	0.00	3	0.05
Two or more races	390	6.16	277	6.07	329	5.85
Total	6,333	100.0	4,567	100.0	5,621	100.0

== Hawthorne Area Community Council ==
The Hawthorne Area Community Council was originally established in the 1970s as a 501 (c) 3 non-profit organization serving the 6,000 residents in the Hawthorne area neighborhood.

The board of directors is composed of representatives from 4 quadrants as well as at-large, non-profit, youth and business representatives who are elected for their terms during the annual meeting typically held in the Fall at Farview Park. The organization's staff size has varied over the years.

The Hawthorne Area Community Council works on active programs of community engagement. The primary newsletter is the Hawthorne Vibe that is published on a quarterly basis by the organization.

The Hawthorne neighborhood is also the home of Farview Park, the oldest park of Minneapolis, the Nellie Stone Johnson School, and the Orvin Olson Park near the Mississippi River.
