= Willard-Hay, Minneapolis =

Neighborhood in Hennepin, Minnesota, United States

Coordinates: 44.9964°N 93.3112°W

Willard-Hay
- Neighborhood
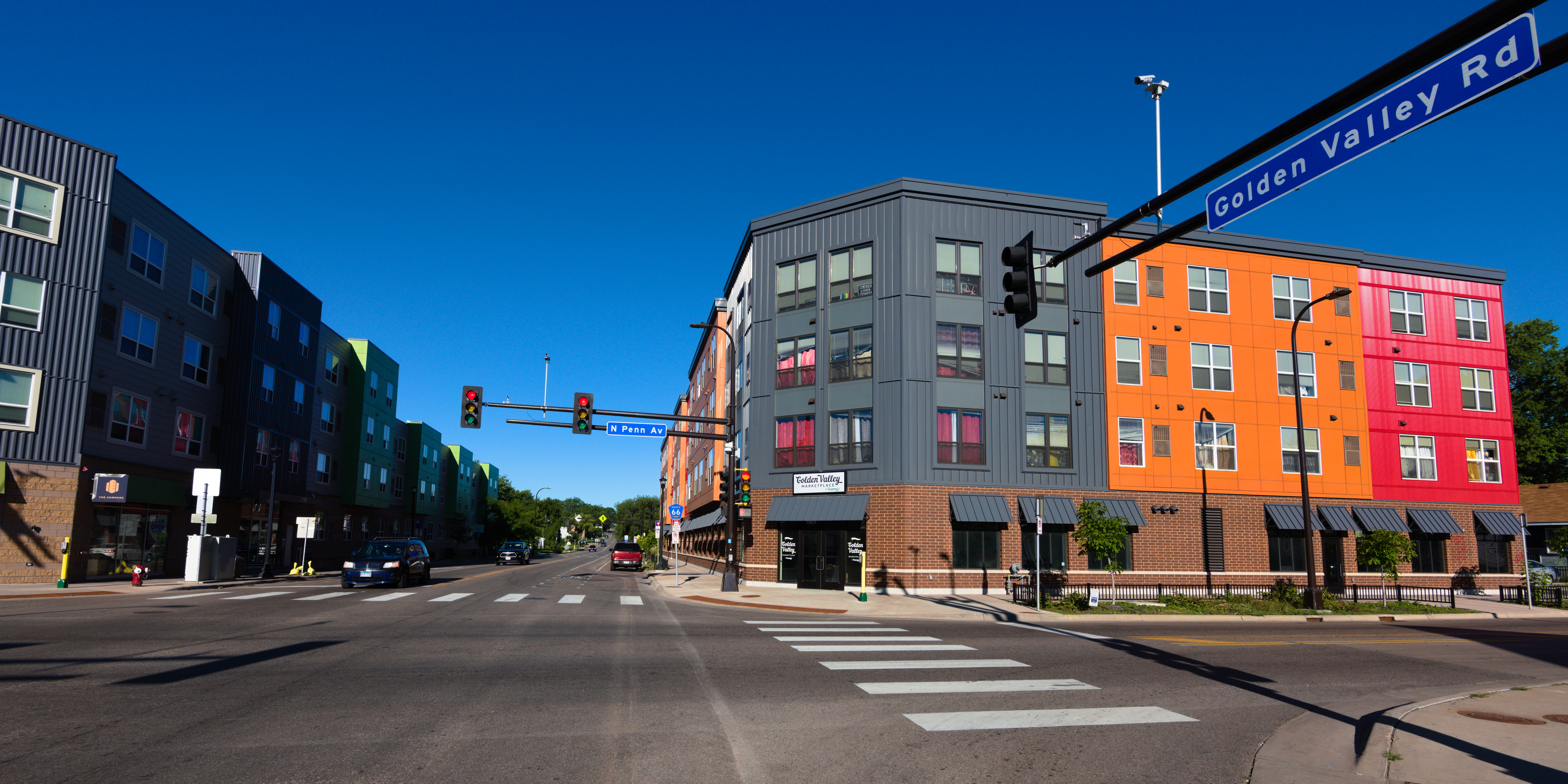
- Nickname: Willard-Homewood
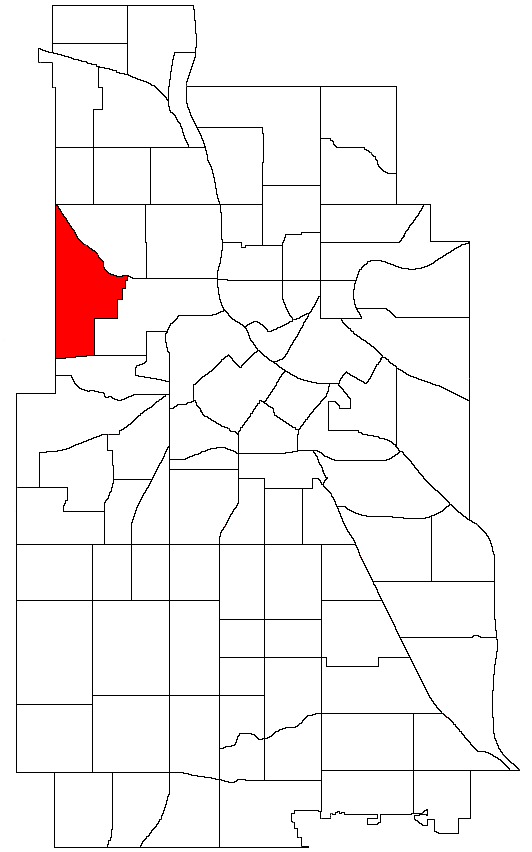
- Location of Willard-Hay within the U.S. city of Minneapolis
- Interactive map of Willard-Hay
- Country: United States
- State: Minnesota
- County: Hennepin
- City: Minneapolis
- Community: Near North
- City Council Wards: 4, 5

Government
  - Council Member: LaTrisha Vetaw
  - Council Member: Pearll Warren

Area
  - Total: 1.068 sq mi (2.77 km^{2})

Population (2020)
  - Total: 8,942
  - Density: 8,373/sq mi (3,233/km^{2})
- Time zone: UTC-6 (CST)
  - Summer (DST): UTC-5 (CDT)
- ZIP code: 55411
- Area code: 612

Willard-Hay is a neighborhood within the larger Near North community in the northwest side of the U.S. city of Minneapolis which is known locally as the "Northside". The neighborhood is often known as Willard-Homewood by residents; the portion south of Plymouth is Homewood. It is named after two elementary schools within its boundaries, Frances Willard and John Hay.

== Geography ==
The boundaries are roughly Olson Memorial Highway on the south, Penn Avenue on the east, (though a small portion of the neighborhood is northeast of Penn and Plymouth) Broadway Avenue on the northeast and Theodore Wirth Park on the west.

It is primarily located in Minneapolis City Council ward 5, with a small portion in the northwest (north of 26th Ave) located in ward 4. Willard-Hay is in Legislative District 59B, represented by State Senator Bobby Joe Champion and State Representative Esther Agbaje.

The Homewood Historic district is located in Willard-Hay, bounded by Plymouth Avenue to the north, Penn Avenue to the east, Oak Park Avenue to the south and Xerxes Avenue to the west. This area was central to the North Side Jewish community beginning in the early 1910s. It was designated by the city as a historic district on February 28, 2017 due to its rich Jewish history. This designation sparked some controversy among Homewood residents.

== Demographics ==
Historical population
Census	Pop.	Note	%±
1980	8,678		—
1990	8,409		−3.1%
2000	9,277		10.3%
2010	8,611		−7.2%
2020	8,942		3.8%

Race/ethnicity
Race/ethnicity	2000		2010		2020	
Race/ethnicity	Number	%	Number	%	Number	%
White alone	1,409	15.19	1,438	16.70	1,927	21.60
Black alone	5,891	63.50	4,873	56.59	4,367	48.95
Hispanic or Latino (any race)	271	2.92	643	7.47	897	10.05
Native American alone	93	1.00	137	1.59	113	1.27
Asian alone	1,113	12.00	985	11.44	946	10.60
Other race alone	38	0.41	17	0.20	45	0.50
Pacific Islander alone	0	0.00	11	0.13	5	0.06
Two or more races	462	4.98	507	5.89	622	6.97
Total	9,277	100.0	8,611	100.0	8,922	100.0
