= Ta-coumba T. Aiken =

American artist and painter

Ta-coumba Tyrone Aiken (born Tyrone Aiken in 1952, Evanston, Illinois) is a painter and public artist who identifies his work as superlative realism. He has created over 600 murals and public art works. A mural Aiken designed in 2013 using over 596,000 Lite Brite pegs holds the Guinness World Record for the largest picture made of Lite Brite. He has also taught and curated. He is sometimes referred to as the "mayor of Lowertown" for his neighborhood presence at his longtime studio in the Lowertown Lofts Artists Cooperative in the Lowertown neighborhood in downtown Saint Paul, Minnesota.

== Early life ==
Tyrone Aiken was born on December 29, 1952, in Evanston, Illinois. His mother was a healer and worked as a house cleaner. His father worked as a garbageman and brought home damaged paint sets for his son from stores that had thrown them in the trash. Aiken's parents changed his name when he was nine at his grandmother's discretion. They were religious and emphasized community, including keeping a separate freezer for food for anyone who needed it. His mother died on his 20th birthday, and he views part of his work as carrying on her legacy of healing.

At the age of three, he was interested in painting, and by age six, he did an exhibit in his childhood home's basement. While in high school in Evanston, he attended the International Design Conference in Aspen, Colorado. He came to Minneapolis at the age of 16 for art school and graduated from the Minneapolis College of Art and Design with a Bachelor of Fine Arts degree in 1974. He initially intended to head for Madison's art scene but got lost and stopped to buy gas in Eau Claire, Wisconsin, where he asked where the nearest town was with more Black people. The gas station employee told him to go to Minneapolis. He worked at Honeywell in Minneapolis as an illustrator. While he worked there, he was invited to the Second World Black and African Festival of Arts and Culture in Nigeria, and that experience changed his artistic path, leading to his work in what he calls superlative realism.

== Work ==
Aiken works in paint, canvas, paper, clay, glass, and metal. He has worked in places across Minnesota, including creating a 1987 mural on a grain elevator in Good Thunder Township, a large mural on the side of the Jax building across from the Union Depot light rail station in downtown Saint Paul, etched glass for the Capitol River Watershed District, murals on a new apartment building in the Rondo neighborhood of Saint Paul, and the ceramic fireplace on the fourth floor of the Minneapolis Central Library.

In 2013, he designed a mural made of over 596,000 Lite Brite pegs that was assembled by volunteers as part of the Saint Paul Foundation's Forever Saint Paul Challenge. The finished mural is 12 feet tall and 24 feet long and is on display at Union Depot in downtown Saint Paul. It remains the world record for the largest picture made from Lite Brite.

In 2022, Aiken was awarded a Guggenheim fellowship in fine arts after previously applying for it several times. He is Minnesota's first Black fine arts recipient of a Guggenheim fellowship. His work is in the collections of the Walker Art Center, the McKnight Foundation, the Minneapolis Central Library, and Augsburg University, among others.

=== Collaborations ===
Aiken often collaborates with fellow artist Seitu Jones. They have collaborated since 1972 and done many murals together. In 1992, they created "Shadows of Spirit," a series of sculptures in the form of human silhouettes cast in bronze that were embedded in the Nicollet Mall wide sidewalks as a commission by the City of Minneapolis. Poetry by Rosemary Soyini Vinelle Guyton is inscribed on each shadow. At the time of their initial installation in 1992, the city did not allow individuals to be identified in art works, so the public had a more difficult time connecting the sculptures with the stories of the people behind them. The seven individuals included:

- Nellie Stone Johnson, a union organizer and the first black elected official in Minneapolis;
- Woo Yee Sing, an early Chinese immigrant to Minneapolis, owned a Chinese restaurant off Nicollet at 6th Street;
- a settler of the Bohemian Flats, a low-lying area on the west bank of the Mississippi;
- writer Meridel LeSueur;
- Dred Scott, an African-American man who was enslaved and sued the Supreme Court for his freedom and the freedom of his wife, Harriet Robinson; and
- Aŋpetu Sapa Wiŋ (Dark Day Woman), a member of the Dakota Tribe, who according to legend, took her own life by paddling a canoe over St. Anthony Falls.

In 2019, the two artists, along with Guyton, developed seven sculptures at the Minneapolis Sculpture Garden entitled "Shadows at the Crossroads" that were intended as an extension of their 1992 Shadows project.

== Awards and fellowships ==
- Guggenheim Fellowship in Fine Arts, 2022
- Knight Arts Challenge Grant, 2015
- Bush Visual Arts fellowship, 1992
- Gottlieb Fellowship
