= Seitu Jones =

American artist

Seitu Kenneth Jones
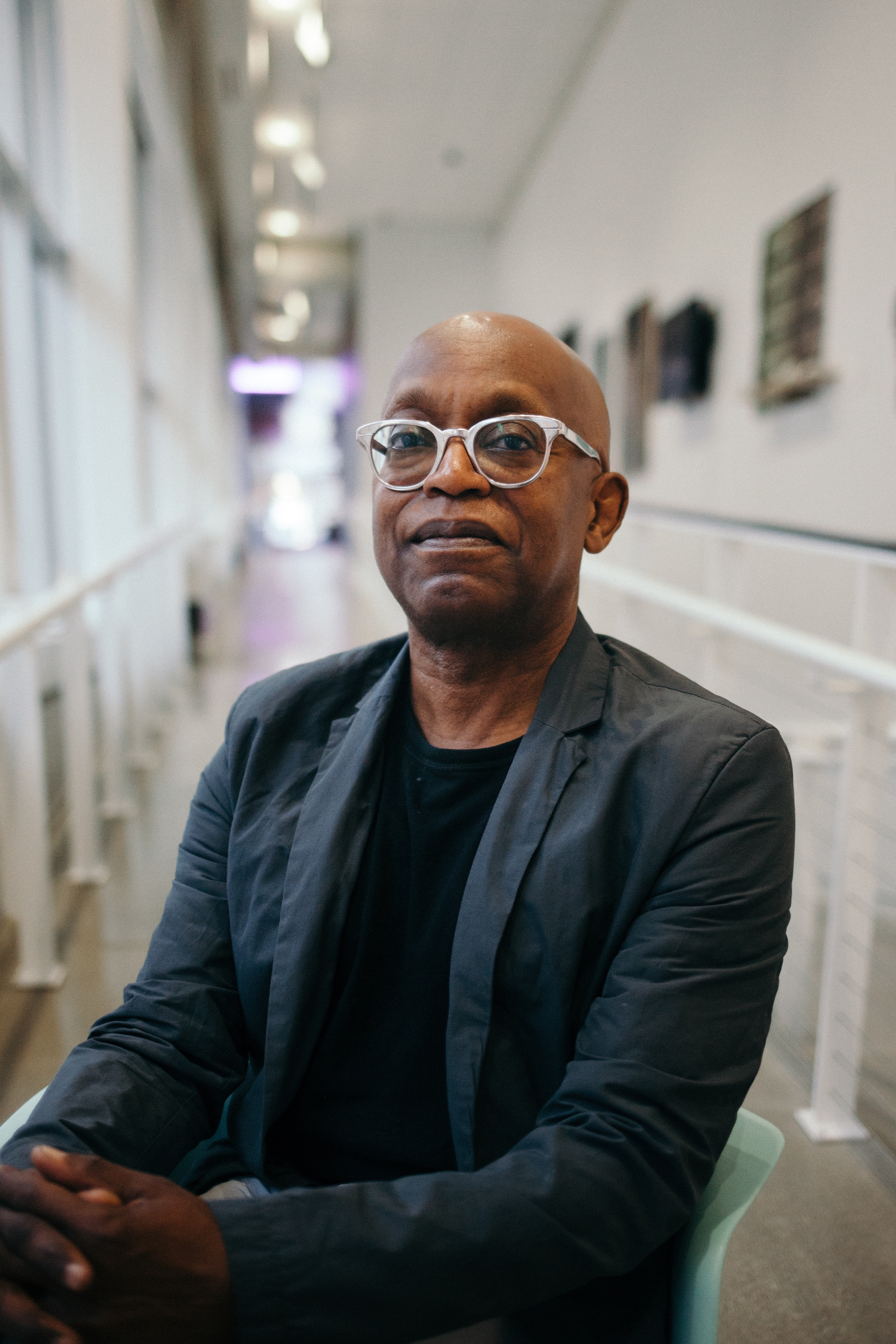
- Seitu Jones
- Born: 1951 (age 74–75); Minneapolis, Minnesota
- Education: M.L.S. in Environmental History and a B.S. in Landscape Design
- Alma mater: University of Minnesota
- Known for: Public artist
- Notable work: “Turnip Greens” Nashville Farmers Market, Nashville, TN, 2019; “At the Crossroads: A Community Meal,” Newfields, Indianapolis, IN, 2019; “Shadows at the Crossroads,” Minneapolis Sculpture Garden, MN, 2019 (collaboration with Ta-coumba T. Aiken and Soyini Guyton); “CREATE: The Community Meal,” St. Paul, MN, 2014; Rice Street, Dale Street and Lexington Parkway Light Rail Stations, St. Paul, MN, 2014; Storyteller’s Bench, Rondo Community Outreach Library, St. Paul, MN, 2013; Harriet Tubman, Tubman Center Alliance, Minneapolis, MN, 2003
- Movement: Black Arts Movement
- Spouse: Soyini Guyton
- Children: Jowell Jones and Jacke Jones
- Website: seitujonesstudio.com

Seitu Jones (born 1951, Minneapolis, Minnesota) is a multi-disciplinary artist and community organizer known for his large-scale public artworks and environmental design. Working both independently and in collaboration with other artists, Jones has created over forty large-scale public art works.

Jones is retired from the faculty of the Interdisciplinary Arts MFA program at Goddard College, Port Townsend, Washington and lives and works in St. Paul, Minnesota.

== Early life and influences ==
Born in north Minneapolis in 1951, Jones attended Field Elementary School in Minneapolis where he realized then he did not want to be anything other than an artist.

Before graduating from high school his grandfather took him to see the Wall of Respect in Chicago, Illinois which was considered the first collective street mural. For Jones, "just seeing these black figures done large-scale – that blew my mind. From then on, I saw the power of the museum of the streets. That was my turning point to want to create large-scale work."

Seitu Jones finds inspiration in his great-grandfather who born in slavery. After gaining his freedom, he later came and settled in Minnesota in 1877 first working at the St. James Hotel in Red Wing, Minnesota, as a porter. After earning enough money he started a farm in Rochester, Minnesota where Seitu Jones' grandmother was born.

Jones describes growing up in a family that was very creative. In addition to having aunts and uncles that were painters, Jones' father was an artist and a painter. And considers himself fortunate to have their work around as inspiration. According to Jones due to discrimination and widespread racism, his father gave up on art as a career, instead running a print shop from his home. His father was also a sign painter, painting signs for black businesses on Minneapolis' south side.

== Work ==
Much of Jones' art centers around placemaking creating and manipulating space while working with the surrounding community to change and temporarily transforming a space to create a sense of place. Jones was also influenced by the Black Arts Movement and its central belief that artists have an obligation to leave their communities “more beautiful than they found it.”

Jones' art has been exhibited at the Walker Art Center, Minneapolis Institute of Arts, the American Craft Museum in New York, and the Renwick Gallery in Washington, DC.

He has created sets for multiple Twin Cities' theaters including Penumbra Theatre Company, SteppingStone Theatre, Macalester College, Pangea World Theater, Minneapolis Children's Theatre Company, Illusion Theater, and Guthrie Theater, as well as First Stage Children's Theater, in Milwaukee, Wisconsin, the Chernin Center for the Arts in Chicago, Illinois, and PS 122 in New York City, New York.

In 2013 Jones received a Joyce Award from Chicago's Joyce Foundation which allowed him to develop "CREATE: The Community Meal", a dinner for 2,000 people at a table a half a mile long. The project focused on access to healthy food.

Jones also designed "Turnip Greens" in 2019. Suspended in the center of the Nashville Farmers' Market atrium, the large scale public art piece depicts a massive basket of spilled greens. The piece honors a staple of local food culture and the people who grow it while shining a light on food injustice. “There’s no way we can meet all the farmers who produce our food for us but this is a small way that we can stretch out our hands to embrace those folks”.

=== Collaborations ===
Jones has collaborated in a number of projects with Ta-coumba T. Aiken, including a project entitled "Shadows of Spirit" (1992), a series of sculptures in the form of human silhouettes cast in bronze and embedded in the Nicollet Mall wide sidewalks with poetry by Rosemary Soyini Vinelle Guyton is inscribed on each shadow. Commissioned by the City of Minneapolis, it honors significant figures from the region's cultural history.

In another collaboration, Jones and Aiken developed seven sculptures at the Minneapolis Sculpture Garden entitled "Shadows at the Crossroads" (2019) meant to be an extension of the Nicollet Mall project, again honoring and celebrating a group of individuals in their public artwork.

== Awards and Fellowships ==
- McKnight Visual Artist Fellowship, Minneapolis, Minnesota, (2020)
- Grand Juried Prize, ArtPrize 9, Grand Rapids, Michigan (2017)
- McKnight Distinguished Artist Award, Minneapolis, Minnesota, (2017)
- Forecast McKnight Public Art Grant, St. Paul, Minnesota (2015)
- Artist at Pine Needles Residency, St. Croix Watershed Research Station (2015 & 2005)
- Joyce Award, Joyce Foundation, Chicago, Illinois, (2013-2014)
- Sally Ordway Irvine Award (Vision) (2006)
- Bush Leadership Fellowship (2005-2006)
- Artist-in-Residence, Ceramic Program, Harvard University (2001-2002)
- Artist and the Millennium Fellowship, Mid-Atlantic Arts Foundation (2001)
- Artist-in-Residence, 651 Arts in Brooklyn (2001)
- NEA/TCG Designer Fellowship (1994-1995)
- Bush Artist Fellowship (1992-1993)
- McKnight Visual Artist Fellowship (1990)
- Minnesota State Arts Board Fellowship (1990)
