= Near North, Minneapolis =

Community of Minneapolis

Near North
- Community
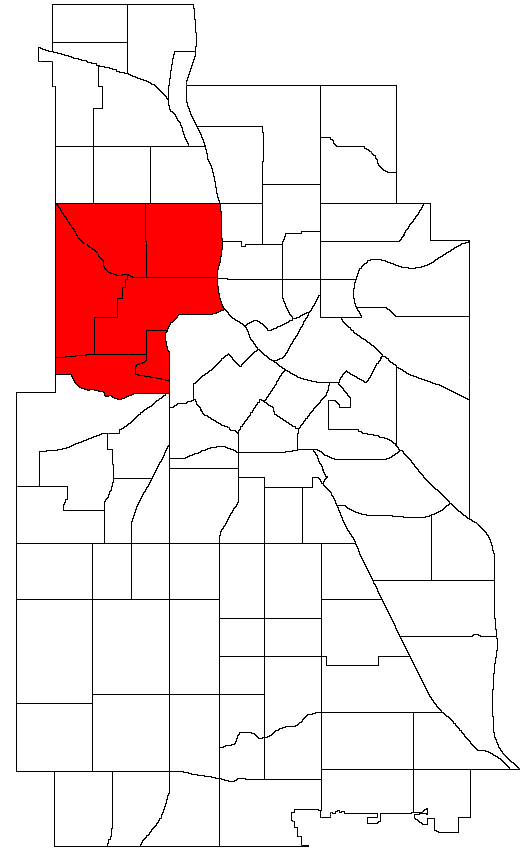
- Location of Near North within the U.S. city of Minneapolis
- Interactive map of Near North
- Coordinates: 45°0′N 93°17′W
- Country: United States
- State: Minnesota
- County: Hennepin
- City: Minneapolis
- Founded: 1849
- City Council Wards: 4, 5
- Neighborhoods: List: Harrison; Hawthorne; Jordan; Near North; Sumner-Glenwood; Willard-Hay

Government
  - Council Member: LaTrisha Vetaw
  - Council Member: Pearll Warren

Area
  - Total: 4.602 sq mi (11.92 km^{2})

Population (2020)
  - Total: 35,013
  - Density: 7,608/sq mi (2,938/km^{2})
- Time zone: UTC-6 (CST)
  - Summer (DST): UTC-5 (CDT)
- ZIP code: 55405, 55411
- Area code: 612

Near North is a community in Minneapolis northwest of the city's downtown area that contains six smaller neighborhoods. The communities of Near North and Camden are often referred to colloquially as "North Minneapolis".

In the early 1900s, the Near North area featured the population center of Jewish people in the city, and since the early 1900s it has been the location of a sizeable African American population and a cultural hub of Black residential and economic development.

== History ==
The Near North community of Minneapolis has had a major African American presence since the early 1900s. Distinguished by its own businesses, organizations, and culture, it remains a hub of African American Minnesotan life in the twenty-first century.

Minneapolis' Near North Side has always been a haven for marginalized communities, mostly for its affordable housing and proximity to downtown. In the early twentieth century, much of the Twin Cities' Jewish population resided in the Near North neighborhood, especially along Plymouth Avenue and what is now the Olson Memorial Highway.

Restrictive covenants written into real estate deeds limited Black people to certain areas of Minneapolis. During World War I, many began moving from longtime-settled neighborhoods, such as Seven Corners near the University of Minnesota, the South Side, and the North Side. The Sumner Field public housing project, completed at 1101 Olson Memorial Highway in 1938, was segregated, but its white Jewish and Black residents generally interacted peacefully.

By 1936, there were more than 16,000 Jews in Minneapolis, and 70% of them lived on the North Side. The Jewish Community of North Minneapolis presents an intriguing record of the earliest beginnings of Jewish communities in the city. Through the medium of historic photographs, this book captures the cultural, economic, political, and social history of this community, from the late 1800s to the present day. The Jews in North Minneapolis enjoyed a busy social and cultural life with their landsmanschaften, and shopped together at the kosher butcher shops and fish markets, grocery stores and bakeries, clothing stores, barber shops, restaurants, and other small businesses that had sprung up along Sixth Avenue North and then Plymouth Avenue. Including vintage images and tales of the community-Hebrew schools, synagogues, and social groups-this collection uncovers the challenges and triumphs of the Jewish community.

When black people arrived in the Twin Cities, they often did not have access to the same community-based agencies as white people, so Black churches, social organizations, and barber and beauty shops provided support. One such place, the Phyllis Wheatley Settlement House, opened in 1924 as a recreation center for African American children. African American activist and writer Ethel Ray Nance also became associated with the Wheatley House.

In 2018, the Minneapolis African American Heritage Museum and Gallery opened on the corner of Penn Avenue and Plymouth Avenue North. Its goal is to preserve the history of Minnesota African Americans, and to showcase the community’s achievements.

== Geography ==
Near North is bounded by Minneapolis city limits at Xerxes Avenue to the west, Lowry Avenue to the north, the Mississippi River and I-94 to the east, and Bassetts Creek and Plymouth Avenue to the south. It is primarily located in ward 5 of the Minneapolis City Council, with a small portion in the northwest in the fourth ward. In the Minnesota Legislature, Near North is primarily in district 59B, with parts in districts 59A and 61A.

== Population ==
The population of Near North has remained relatively steady since 1980 and is currently just over 35,000 people.

Historical population
| Census | Pop. | Note | %± |
|---|---|---|---|
| 1980 | 33,721 | | — |
| 1990 | 35,225 | | 4.5% |
| 2000 | 35,632 | | 1.2% |
| 2010 | 31,192 | | −12.5% |
| 2020 | 35,013 | | 12.2% |

The racial makeup of the community is 17,987 (50.9%) Black, 7,804 (22.1%) White, 3,632 (10.3%) Hispanic or Latino, 2,870 (8.1%) Asian, and 456 (1.3%) Native American. 2,365 (6.7%) are of two or more races. 6,916 (19.6%) of residents are foreign-born. The educational attainment of the community is lower than the rest of city: 3,781 (18.8%) have less than a high school diploma (compared to 9.2% city-wide), and only 4,813 (23.9%) have a bachelor's degree or more (compared to 53.5% city-wide).

== Neighborhoods in Near North community ==
- Harrison
- Hawthorne
- Jordan
- Near North
- Sumner-Glenwood
- Willard-Hay
