= Eliza Myrie =

American visual artist (born 1981)

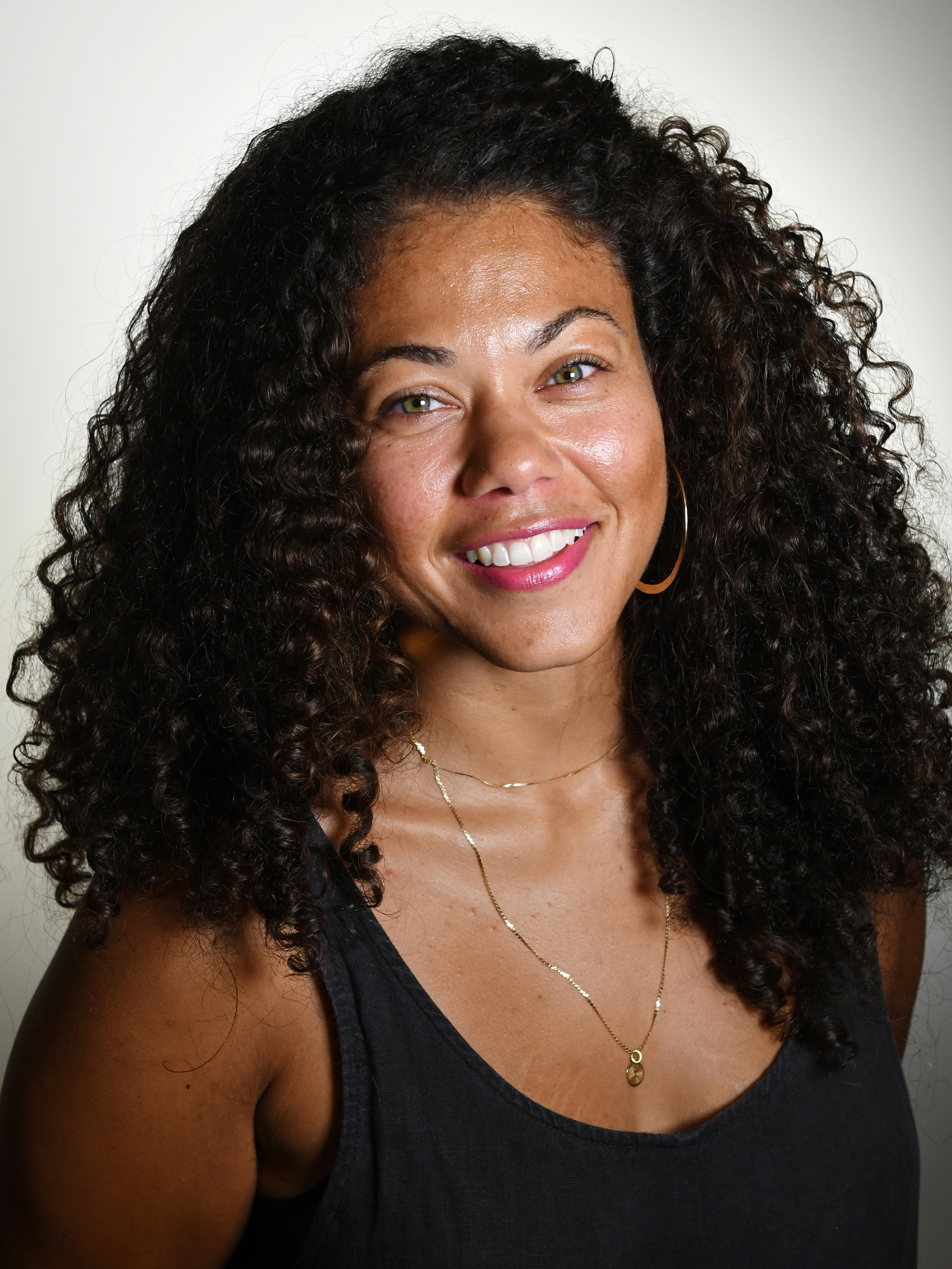
- Myrie at the Brooklyn Museum in July 2017
- Born: 1981 (age 44–45); New York, U.S.
- Education: Williams College - BA; Northwestern University - MFA; The Skowhegan School; The Whitney Independent Study Program
- Occupation: Visual artist
- Known for: Social practice
- Website: ElizaMyrie.com

Eliza Myrie (stylized in all lowercase; born 1981) is a visual artist who lives and works in Chicago, Illinois. Myrie works in a variety of media, including sculpture, participatory installation art, public art, and printmaking.

== Early life and education ==
myrie's father is a stonemason. Myrie received her MFA from Northwestern University and her BA from Williams College. Myrie was a participant at The Skowhegan School in 2010 and The Whitney Independent Study Program 2019-2020.

== Art career ==
myrie co-founded the Black Artists Retreat (2013–2016) with Theaster Gates, underwritten by the Rebuild Foundation, that gathered an intergenerational group of black visual artists outside of traditional art institutions. In winter 2016, Myrie was awarded a MacDowell fellowship. In 2017/2018, Myrie held the Equal Justice Residency/Fellowship at the Santa Fe Art Institute. Myrie is the Wiki Project Manager at Black Lunch Table.

=== Teaching ===
myrie has taught at the School of the Art Institute of Chicago and Williams College.

=== Selected exhibitions ===
- Davidson Contemporary, New York (2010)
- Hyde Park Arts Center, Chicago (2010)
- New Museum of Contemporary Art, New York (2011)
- Museum of Contemporary Art Chicago, Chicago (2012)
- Roots and Culture, Chicago (2014)
- Shane Campbell, Chicago (2016)
- Vox Populi, Philadelphia (2016)

=== Awards ===
- LeRoy Neiman and Janet Byrne Neiman ARTADIA Awardee - Chicago, 2020
