= Isaac Sutton (photographer) =

American photographer (1923-1995)

- Born: 1923; Shreveport, Louisiana
- Died: 1995 (aged 71–72); Los Angeles, California
- Known for: photography

Isaac Sutton (1923-1995) was an American photographer. He is known for his work as head photographer for the Black owned Johnson Publishing Company which published the influential magazines Jet and Ebony. Examples include his 1958 and 1962 photographs in Jet of Storme DeLarverie, the famous male impressionist in the Jewel Box Revue.

Sutton was born in 1923 in Shreveport, Louisiana. Sutton died in 1995 in Los Angeles, California.

In 2018, artist Theaster Gates created an archive of photographs by Isaac Sutton, and fellow Johnson photographer Moneta Sleet Jr. entitled Black Image Corporation. The archive was exhibited at the Osservatorio of the Fondazione Prada.

Sutton's work was included in the 2025 exhibition Photography and the Black Arts Movement, 1955–1985 at the National Gallery of Art. His photographs are in the collection of the National Museum of African American History and Culture.
