= Theaster Gates =

American artist (born 1973)

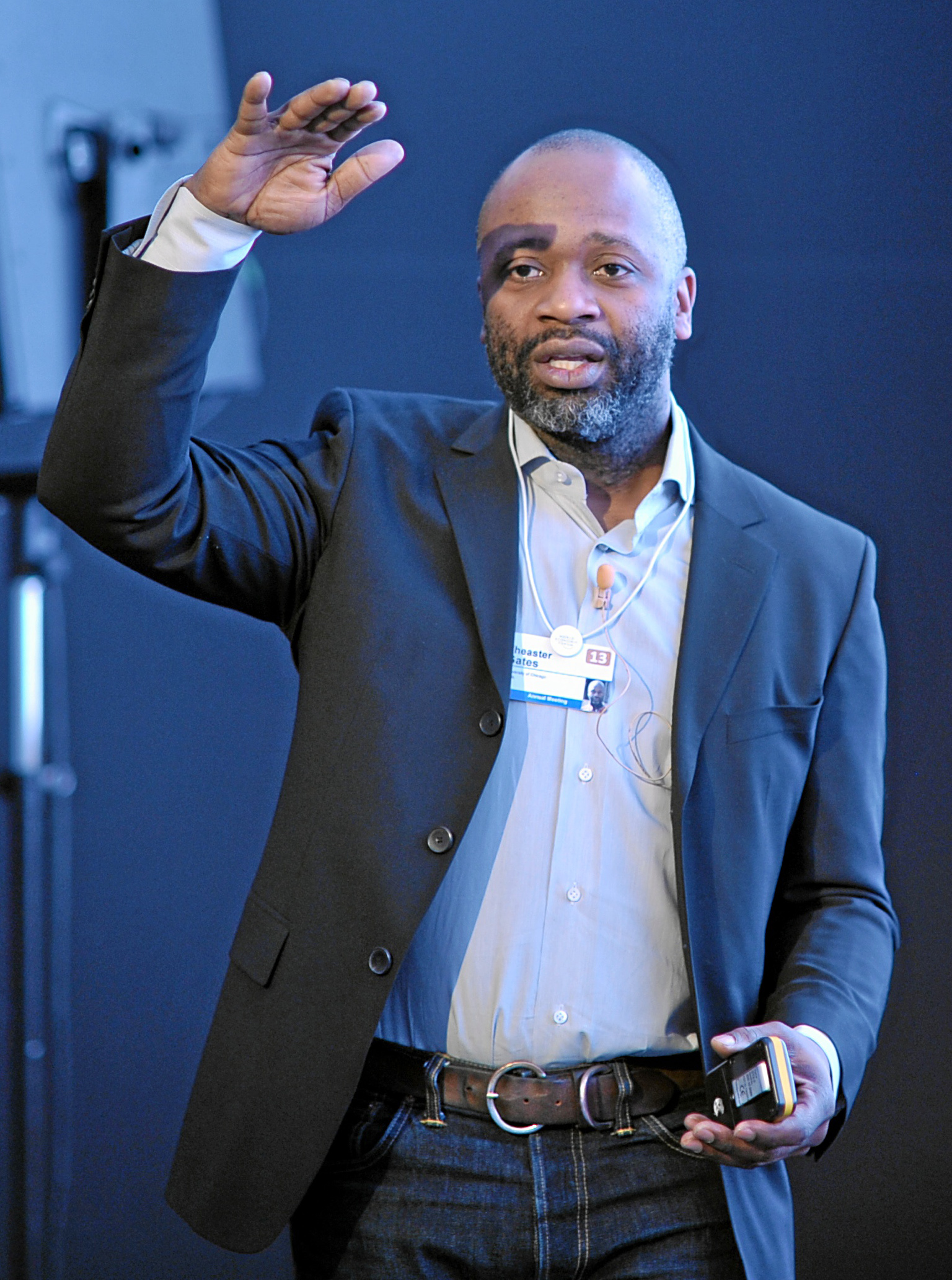
- Gates in 2013
- Born: August 28, 1973 (age 52); Chicago, Illinois, US
- Known for: Installation art, Sculpture
- Notable work: Civil Tapestry series (2011-ongoing); Black Vessel for a Saint (2017)
- Movement: Social practice, Urbanism
- Website: TheasterGates.com

Theaster Gates (US: /θiːˌæstər ˈɡeɪts/; born August 28, 1973) is an American social practice installation artist and a professor in the Department of Visual Arts at the University of Chicago. He was born in Chicago, Illinois, where he still lives and works.

Gates' work has been shown at major museums and galleries internationally and deals with urban planning, religious space, and craft. He works to revitalize underserved neighborhoods by combining urban planning and art practices. Gates' art practice responds to disinvestment in African-American urban communities, particularly after the 2008 financial crisis, addresses the importance of formal archives for remembering and valuing Black cultural forms, and disrupts artistic canons, especially those of post-painterly abstraction and color field painting.

== Early life and education ==
Theaster Gates was born and raised in East Garfield Park on the West Side of Chicago. He was the youngest of nine children and the only son. His father was a roofer, and his mother a school teacher. His sisters passed on their interest in civil rights activism, and the family attended a Baptist church where Gates, a choir member, became interested in performance. Gates attended Lane Technical High School.

In 1996, Gates graduated from Iowa State University with a B.S. in urban planning and ceramics. After college, he worked primarily in ceramics and spent a year in Tokoname, Japan, studying pottery. He decided he wanted to explore religion in South Africa, and in 1998 he received an M.A. degree at the University of Cape Town in fine arts and religious studies.

== Work ==
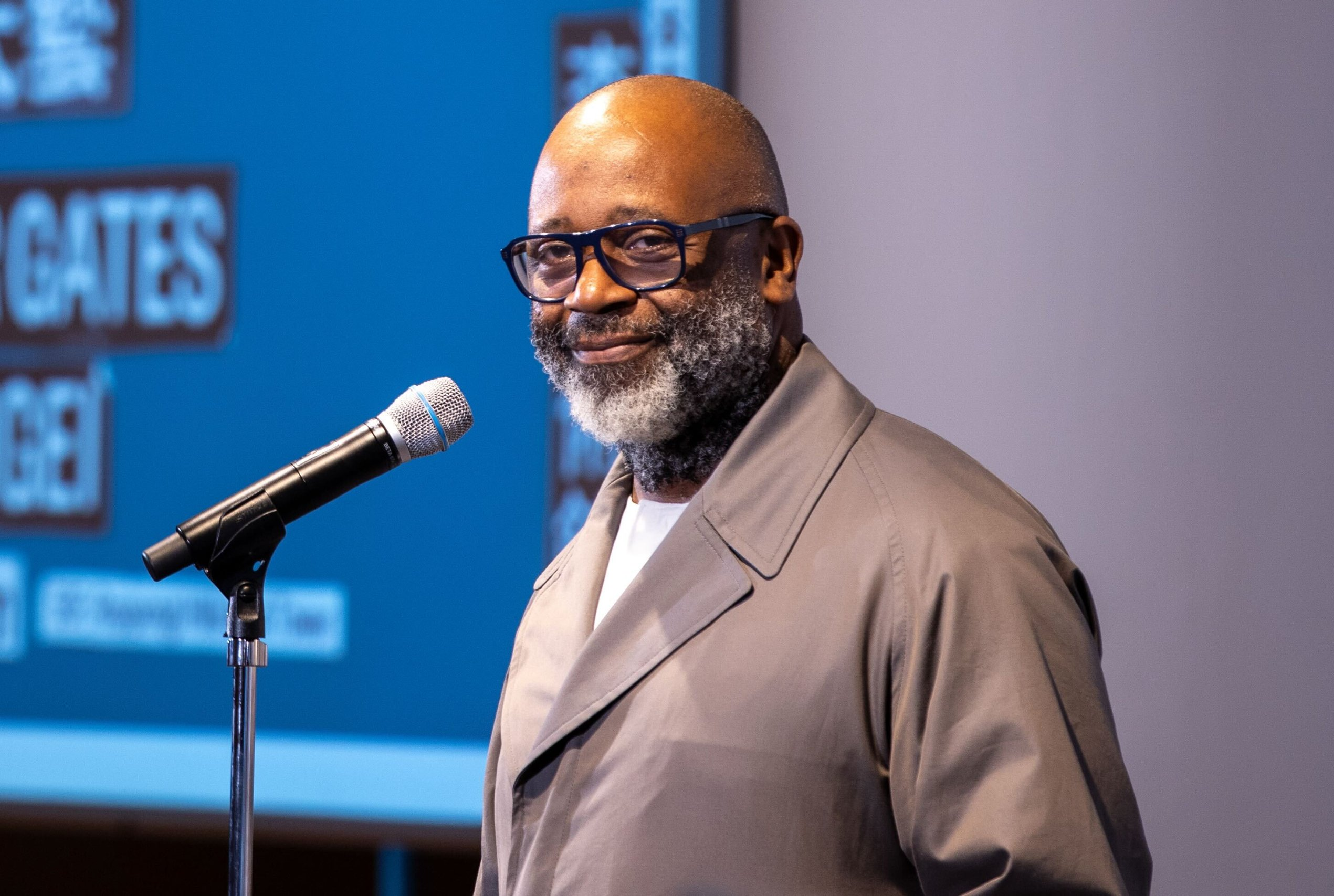
Gates at the opening for his April 2024 exhibit in Tokyo

=== Early work ===
Gates' early work centered on his training as a ceramicist and study of comparative religions, and "many of his early projects addressed the shared significance of pottery in Japan culture and African-American cultures".

In 2007, Gates organized a conceptual exhibition at the Hyde Park Art Center titled Plate Convergence in which he staged a fictional event as an elaborate backstory for ceramic plates he had made. The fiction involved Shoji Yamaguchi, a Japanese-born potter who had emigrated to the United States after WWII and took up residence in Mississippi, where he married a local black woman and civil rights activist and designed a plate especially suitable for the cuisine of black people. The plate became a centerpiece of dinner parties and salons for discussing art and politics. In Gates' words: "As the story went, [Yamaguchi] and his wife died in a car accident in 1991 and their son founded the Yamaguchi Institute to continue their vision of social transformation. I made ceramic plates, videotaped highly curated dinners and found a space for an exhibition of the ceramics and video. We gave a huge Japanese soul-food dinner, made by a Japanese chef and my sister, in honor of the Yamaguchis and their dinners. A young mixed-race artist enacted the role of their son and thanked everyone for coming."

In 2008, Gates created his second fictional institution, with the exhibition "Tea Shacks, Collard Greens and the Preservation of Soul" at a temporary gallery space in Chicago that Gates dubbed the Center for the Proliferation of Afro-Asian Artifacts.

In 2010, Gates created an exhibition responding to and centering around the work of David Drake, titled Theaster Gates: To Speculate Darkly, at the Milwaukee Art Museum. In this exhibition Gates used Drake's work to address issues of craft and race in African-American history.

=== Rebuild Foundation ===
Gates is the founder and artist director of the Rebuild Foundation, a non-profit organization focused on cultural-driven redevelopment and affordable space initiatives in under-resourced communities. Under Gates' leadership, the Rebuild Foundation currently manages projects in the Greater Grand Crossing neighborhood of Chicago. Rebuild gained 501(c)(3) status in December 2010. Program sites include the Stony Island Arts Bank, the Black Cinema House, the Dorchester Art + Housing Collaborative, Archive House, and Listening House.

For the Dorchester Projects, Gates restored and converted vacant buildings into cultural institutions with archival collections from the South Side. Gates's Rebuild Foundation has renovated two houses on Dorchester Avenue, now called the Archive House and the Listening House. The Archive House holds 14,000 architecture books from a closed bookshop. The Listening House holds 8,000 records purchased at the closing of Dr. Wax Records.

=== Stony Island Arts Bank ===
In 2013, Gates purchased the Stony Island State Savings Bank from the city of Chicago. The bank, now known as the Stony Island Arts Bank, contains the book collection of John H. Johnson, founder of Ebony and Jet magazines; the record collection of Frankie Knuckles, the godfather of house music; and slides of the collections of the University of Chicago and the Art Institute of Chicago. In 2015, his Stony Island work was included in the inaugural Chicago Architecture Biennial. The physical location of the Bank has also allowed Gates to host temporary exhibitions of artists, such as Glenn Ligon.

=== Work with archival collections ===
Ground Rules (black line) (2015) at the National Gallery of Art in 2022

In Case of Race Riot Break the Glass (2011) at the National Gallery of Art's showing of Afro-Atlantic Histories in 2022

By working with archival collections centered in African-American history, Gates' work addresses issues of history, memory, and the value ascribed to Black history and cultural production. He cites the influence on his own work of, for example, the Chicago ceramicist Marva Lee Pitchford-Jolly. His 2017 piece "plantation lullabies" involved 4,000 pieces of what Gates describes as "negrobilia". This included: old sheet music, signs, pamphlets, coin banks, figurines - as part of the Edward Williams Collection. Similarly, his Black Image Corporation involved the use of John H. Johnson's photographic archive - with special focus being given to Black image-makers who were prominent during the civil rights era - Moneta Sleet Jr and Isaac Sutton. Many of his works incorporate archived objects imbued with histories of racism, like his extensive series of works made with decommissioned firehoses, including In Case of Race Riot Break the Glass (2011) and the Civil Tapestry series (2011-ongoing). The use of the hoses gestures to the extensive history of police departments using firehoses to attack protesters during the Civil Rights Movement. A 2024 exhibition at the Stony Island Arts Bank, combines original work by Gates and other artists with archival materials, furnishings and decor that Gates salvaged from the Johnson Publishing Company's South Michigan Avenue building in Chicago in 2010.

=== University of Chicago Arts and Public Life initiative ===
From 2011 to 2018, Gates was the founding director of Arts + Public Life at the University of Chicago. In this role, he oversaw staff at the Arts Incubator in Washington Park and the Reva and David Logan Center for the Arts, a wide network of resident and visiting artists (including current and former participants in our residency program), community participants, programmatic partners, and friends. He is also a full professor in the Department of Visual Arts at the university.

Gates was also the leader of the Place Lab, a partnership between Arts + Public Life and the Harris School of Public Policy, which worked to design and implement new approaches to urban development. The Place Lab partnered with the demonstration cities of Gary, Akron, Detroit, and other Knight Foundation communities.

=== Other exhibitions and performances ===
In January 2014 he designed a million-dollar installation for the South Side's 95th Street subway terminal. It is the largest public art project in the history of the Chicago Transit Authority. He was participant at the 2012 DOCUMENTA (13) art show in Kassel, Germany, where he exhibited "12 Ballads for Huguenot House", restoring an entire building that had housed fleeing Huguenots in the past and organising events and concerts there throughout the summer. He took part in the 2010 Whitney Biennial in New York, the Milwaukee Art Museum in 2010, the 2010 Art Chicago fair. He was included in "Hand+Made: The Performative Impulse in Art and Craft", at the Contemporary Arts Museum Houston, and in 2013 had a solo show, 13th Ballad, at the Museum of Contemporary Art, Chicago. On May 30, 2014, Gates and jazz pianist Jason Moran led a one-time performance entitled Looks of a Lot as part of the "Symphony Center Presents Jazz" series and the Chicago Symphony Orchestra's "Truth to Power Festival". In summer 2015, he was invited to the 15th Istanbul Biennial, where he created "Three or four shades of blue" by setting up a pottery shop in the old town, connecting Afro-American history and craft to Iznik pottery, and more.

In October 2015, Gates created an installation at Temple Church, Bristol, England. Built in co-operation with its owner English Heritage, "Sanctum" will provide a venue with 24 hours of music and performance over 24 days, in a performance event funded by Arts Council England and developed as part of Bristol 2015 Green Capital.

In October 2020, Gates opened a large scale show at Gagosian Gallery in New York City. The show titled is Black Vessel. The show explores themes of family life, maternal love, and manual labor. Many of the materials he used in the show are roofing materials, an homage to his father who worked as a roofer. The central installation is the main gallery, which Gates lined with bricks fired black at a South Carolina brickworks. Gates cited the COVID-19 pandemic and the time he spent alone as having created an environment within which to incubate his ideas.

His exhibition Future Histories: Theaster Gates and Cauleen Smith, appeared at the SF MOMA from October 2020-May 2021. A Clay Sermon at London's Whitechapel Gallery went on display from October – January 2021. In addition to a new film work and a series of ceramic vessels, the exhibition included a selection of historic ceramics from private and public collections, including the Victoria and Albert Museum, where he has been emeritus Fellow at the V&A Research Institute. As part of Gates's 2021–2022 London take-over, he also mounted an exhibition at White Cube Mason's Yard, Oh, The Wind Oh, The Wind and a display Slight Intervention #5 at Victoria and Albert Museum. The exhibition, Theaster Gates: When Clouds Roll Away: Reflection and Restoration from the Johnson Archive, opened at the Stony Island Arts Center in 2024.

The Smart Museum of Art is scheduled to run Theaster Gates: Unto Thee from September 23, 2025 to February 22, 2026, which has been described as "the first large-scale attempt by a Chicago institution to place a traditional museum framework around a local artist best known for 20 years of non-traditional, not-always-gallery-obvious works." It will include new paintings, sculptures, and films, intermingled with some of his reclamation projects, and will extend outside the Smart Museum to some of Gates' other spaces.

=== Future projects ===
Gates designed the 2022 Serpentine Pavilion for Serpentine Galleries. Gates working as a team with architects Asif Khan Studio, Sir David Adjaye, and Mariam Kamara will undertake The Waterfront Transformation: Canning Dock project, which is part of the 10-year plan of National Museums Liverpool to transform the city's waterfront. They will redevelop the site's buildings including the Dr Martin Luther King Jr building, which will sit at the centre of the International Slavery Museum. Gates has described Liverpool's Canning Dock as representing "one of the most important racialised sites in the UK" and that the team wanted to "give emotional heft to the truth of slavery in the UK historically" by "using the tools of monument making and memorialising and commemoration".

== Recognition ==
- 2008 – Artadia Award
- 2012 – Fellow of United States Artists
- 2012 – "Innovator of the Year" by the Wall Street Journal
- 2012 – #56 in ArtReview list of the hundred most powerful people in the art world
- 2013 – Inaugural Award of The Vera List Center for Art and Politics
- 2013 – #40 in ArtReview list of the hundred most powerful people in the art world
- 2014 – #44 in ArtReview list of the hundred most powerful people in the art world
- 2014 – International Artist Award, Anderson Ranch Arts Center
- 2015 – £40,000 Artes Mundi award in Cardiff, Wales
- 2015 – Honorary Doctorate of Fine Arts from San Francisco Art Institute
- 2015 – Smithsonian Magazine American Ingenuity Award for Social Progress
- 2016 – Kurt Schwitters Prize for 2017
- 2017 – Chevalier de l'Ordre national de la Légion d'honneur from the French Ambassador to the United States, Gérard Araud
- 2018 – Nasher Prize Laureate at the Nasher Sculpture Center
- 2018 – Urban Land Institute J.C. Nichols Prize for Visionaries in Urban Development
- 2019 – #20 in ArtReview list of the hundred most powerful people in the art world
- 2021 – Frederick Kiesler Prize for Architecture and the Arts
- 2021 – #4 in ArtReview list of the hundred most powerful people in the art world
- 2023 – Isamu Noguchi Award
- 2025 - Guggenheim Fellowship

== Philanthropy ==
Since 2016, Gates has been serving on the board of the Hirshhorn Museum and Sculpture Garden. In 2017, he served on the selection committee for the design of the Barack Obama Presidential Center in Chicago.

In 2018, along with David Adjaye and Bono, Gates curated the third (RED) auction in Miami to support the Global Fund's work against AIDS, raising a total $10.5 million, including matching funds by the Bill & Melinda Gates Foundation. Since 2019, he has been co-chairing the fashion group Prada's Diversity and Inclusion Advisory Council, alongside Ava DuVernay.

== Notable works in public collections ==
- Whyte Painting (KOH0015) (2010), Walker Art Center, Minneapolis
- Whyte Painting (NGGRWR 00021) (2010), Museum of Contemporary Art, Chicago
- Civil Tapestry 4 (2011), Tate, London
- Minority Majority (2012), Whitney Museum of American Art, New York
- Hose for Fire and Other Tragic Encounters (2014), Menil Collection, Houston
- Ground Rules (black line) (2015), National Gallery of Art, Washington, DC
- Ground rules. Free throw (2015), Smithsonian American Art Museum, Smithsonian Institution, Washington, DC
- Progress (2016), Walker Art Center, Minneapolis
- Ship of Zion (2016), Colby College Museum of Art, Waterville, Maine
- Black Vessel for a Saint (2017), Minneapolis Sculpture Garden, Walker Art Center
- “Do you hear me calling?” (Mama Mamama or What is Black Power) (2018), San Francisco Museum of Modern Art and Whitney Museum of American Art, New York

== Bibliography ==
- Carol Becker, Lisa Yun Lee, Achim Borchardt-Hume, Theaster Gates, Phaidon, London, 2015.
- Bill Brown, Fred Moten, Jacqueline Terrassa, Theaster Gates: My Labor Is My Protest, White Cube, London, 2013.
- Michael Darling, Matthew Day Jackson, Carolyn Christov-Bakargiev, Theaster Gates: 12 Ballads for Huguenot House, Walther König, Cologne, 2012.
