= Rebuild Foundation =

US non-profit organization

- Formation: 2009; 17 years ago
- Type: Non-profit
- Legal status: 501(c)(3)
- Purpose: Serves as a platform for art, cultural development, and transforming neighborhoods
- Headquarters: 6760 S. Stony Island Ave.
- Region served: Cook County
- Founder: Theaster Gates
- Website: rebuild-foundation.org

Rebuild Foundation is a non-profit organization founded in 2009 by Theaster Gates, a social practice installation artist and urban planner. It is based on South Side of Chicago. It operates several projects and spaces including the Stony Island Arts Bank, Dorchester Art + Housing Collaborative, and Archive House.

== History ==
In 2009, Theaster Gates founded the Rebuild Foundation to collaborate with cities to transform vacant buildings into vibrant, economic, and cultural spaces. The foundation currently consists of seven distinct projects, all in Chicago: Dorchester Industries, Dorchester Art and Housing Collaborative, Stony Island Arts Bank, Black Cinema House, Black Artists Retreat, Archive House, and Listening House.

== Stony Island Arts Bank ==
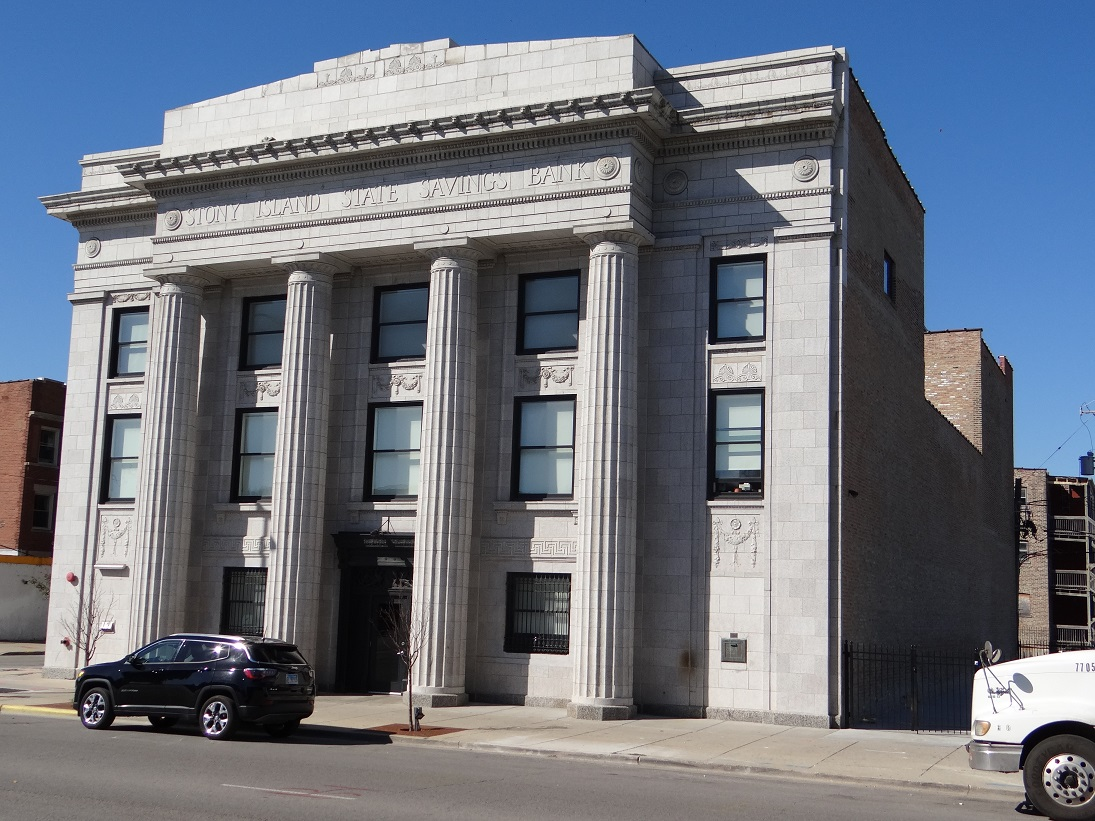
Stony Island Arts Bank

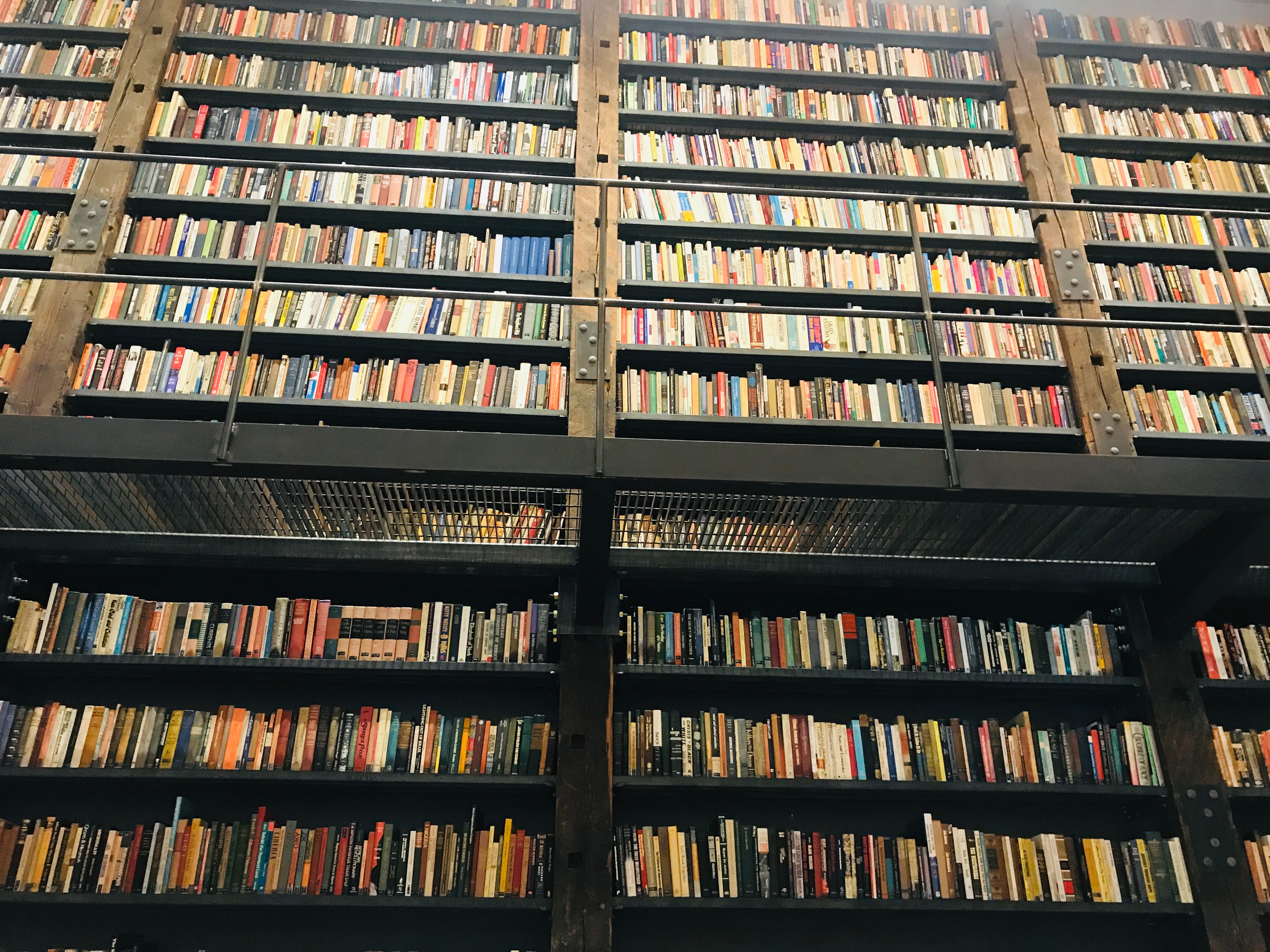
Library room

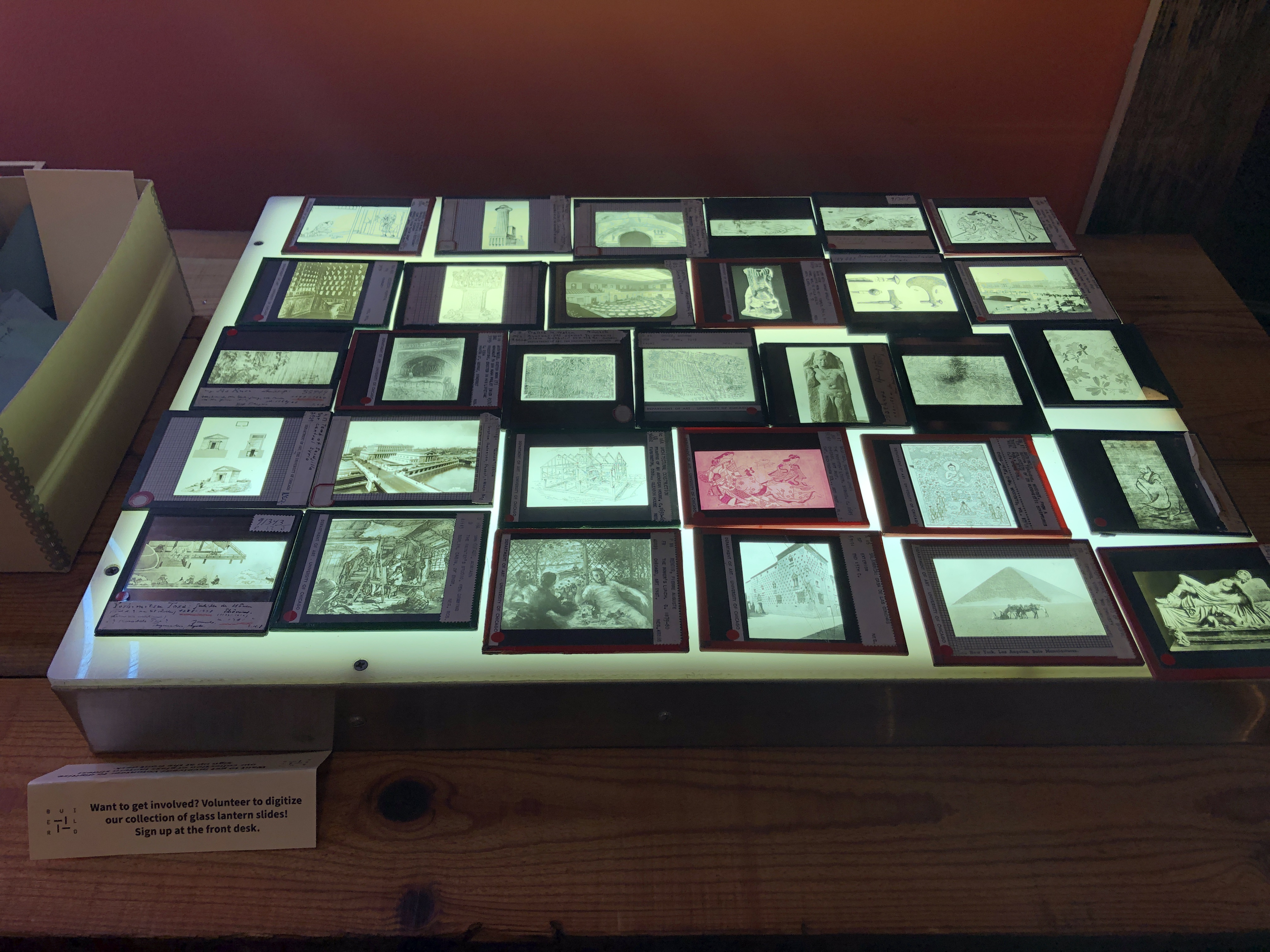
Glass lantern slides

The Stony Island Arts Trust and Savings Bank Building is one of Rebuild Foundation’s flagship projects. Originally built as a community bank in the South Shore neighborhood of Chicago, the structure had been abandoned since the 1980s. In 2013, Theaster Gates acquired the building from the City of Chicago for one dollar and led its transformation in collaboration with designer William Gibbens Uffendell. To fund the restoration, Gates sold marble fragments from the building as art objects and organized a fundraising gala.

The rehabilitated Arts Bank now serves as a multidisciplinary cultural center dedicated to African American culture, art, history, and architecture. It hosts monthly exhibitions, film screenings, public readings, and community programs, with a focus on preserving and reactivating local heritage. Its collections include the Johnson Publishing Company library, house music archives, and other artifacts.

The Stony Island Arts Bank holds different exhibits every month and preserves many artifacts important to Chicago's music history.

In 2014, Rebuild Foundation received an investment contribution from JP Morgan Chase worth $300,000. Rebuild Foundation directed the investment to the renovation of St. Laurence School in Chicago, which is based in the Stony Island Arts Bank. In 2016, Stony Island Arts Bank received the Richard H. Driehaus Foundation Preservation Award.This award recognizes stories of salvaging buildings throughout the state, displaying how restoration has a positive impact on communities, the environment and residents of the state.

=== Stony Island Arts Bank Collections ===
The Stony Island Arts Bank houses several significant collections that preserve and celebrate African American cultural heritage. Among the most notable are:

- Edward J. Williams "Negrobilia" Collection: An archive of racially charged memorabilia known as “Negrobilia,” collected to provoke critical dialogue on representation and race in American history.
- Johnson Publishing Archive + Collections: Formerly held by the publisher of Ebony and Jet magazines, these materials document Black media history and culture in the 20th century.
- University of Chicago Glass Lantern Slides: Historic slides used in art history and architectural lectures, now preserved and recontextualized for public engagement.
- Tamir Rice Gazebo Memorial: The reconstructed gazebo from Cleveland, Ohio, where 12-year-old Tamir Rice was fatally shot by police in 2014, now serves as a space for reflection and remembrance.

== Dorchester Industries ==
Dorchester Industries, founded on November 1, 2016, is a creative industrial initiative under the Rebuild Foundation that blends art, design, and vocational training. Led by artists and makers, the program reuses salvaged materials—often donated by the City of Chicago—to produce furniture, architectural elements, and works of art. In addition to its production work, Dorchester Industries functions as a training ground for emerging talent from under-resourced neighborhoods. Participants learn to work with materials such as clay and wood, and develop skills like kiln firing, glazing and carpentry. The program promotes craftsmanship as a pathway to professional development, encouraging participants to pursue careers in the trades and creative industries.

=== Programs ===
==== Dorchester Industries Apprentice Program ====
The Dorchester Industries Apprentice Program offers South Side residents the opportunity to apprentice with local tradespeople. Such initiatives include landscapers, masons, and contractors—as well as with Rebuild Foundation’s artists-in-residence. Participants co-create original design objects and artworks, which are later showcased and auctioned at benefit events to support their professional growth.

== Dorchester Art + Housing Collaborative ==
The Dorchester Art + Housing Collaborative is a mixed-income residential and arts development created through the redevelopment of the former Dante Harper Housing Project. The site combines rental housing with shared arts facilities and programming designed to integrate public housing residents and practicing artists.

=== Development and design ===
The project was developed by Brinshore Development in partnership with Rebuild Foundation and its founder, Theaster Gates, with architectural design by Landon Bone Baker Architects. The redevelopment retained the modern design and original layout of the housing complex. The principal architectural modification was the creation of a central Arts Center, formed through the conversion of four former townhomes located within the development.

=== Arts Center and programming ===
The Arts Center serves as a shared community space for residents to create, present, and collaborate on artistic work. Artists residing within the development provide voluntary art instruction and workshops for low-income residents, including families living in public housing units.

Rebuild Foundation also coordinates arts programming in partnership with external organizations. These include Little Black Pearl, a nonprofit organization that provides arts education and mentorship for urban youth on Chicago’s South Side, and Hyde Park Arts Center, which supports contemporary artists through exhibitions, education, and community engagement.

=== Housing composition ===
The development includes 32 mixed-income rental units, primarily two- and three-bedroom apartments. Of these, 12 units are reserved for public housing residents, 11 are offered as affordable rentals, and 9 are rented at market rates.

=== Awards ===
Awards received by The Rebuild Foundation include:

- 2015 Urban Land Institute Vision Award for Arts and Community
- 2015 Landmarks Illinois Richard H. Driehaus Foundation Preservation Project of the Year Award, for adaptive reuse
- 2016 Merit Award, Illinois Chapter of the American Society of Landscape Architects
- 2016 Creating Community Connection Award, American Institute of Architects / United States Department of Housing and Urban Development Secretary’s Awards

== Black Cinema House ==
The Black Cinema House is located on the South Side of Chicago and its purpose is to screen and discuss films made by the African American community. They opened in October 2012. W. Phillips Jr., a long-time film programmer, is the director at The Black Cinema house and Amir George, a filmmaker and curator, is the programmer in Residence.

=== History ===
The Black Cinema House was created from an abandoned building in the Dorchester neighborhood of Chicago's South Side and took about a year to construct. The Black Cinema house is 1/3 of the "Dorchester Projects." The other two are The Listening House and The Archive House.

=== Programs ===
The BCH offers a video production class to the fifth graders at the South Shore Fine-Arts Academy in collaboration with the Community TV Network, a non-profit organization that focuses on youth and digital media. The BCH also collaborated with Kartemquin to produce a screening and discussion of three films focusing on race in Chicago called "Chicago: Segregated City." Located at Chicago Public Library, greater Grand Crossing Branch, 1000 E 73rd St.

== Black Artists Retreat ==
Black Artists Retreat (BAR) was founded by Theaster Gates and Eliza Myrie, a Chicago-based artist, with the goal of creating time and space for artists to be together. Gates' goal to gather was matched with Myrie's goal of motivating dialogue among artists of color. This artist-led initiative is guided by the tenets of fellowship, rejuvenation, and intellectual rigor. The Retreat is held annually in Chicago, where it was originated. This two-day event includes roller skating, music, and performances, as well as art installations. The Retreat explores how artists, performers, curators, historians, and others play, pray, worship, commune, entertain, interrupt, celebrate, heal, mourn and invite unity. 2019 was the first year the Retreat was held outside of Gates' native town, the Retreat was held in New York, at the Park Avenue Armory's Drill Hall. Gates rehabbed the hall with the Park Avenue Armory Conservancy.

== Archive House ==
The Archive House is a transformed building that houses a micro library. Gates acquired the building that is now the Archive House in 2009 for $16,000. The Archive House is one of Gates' projects within Dorchester Industries. Similar to Gates' other rehabilitation projects, the Archive House incorporates many reclaimed materials.

== Listening House ==
The Listening House is a renovated South Side candy store that provides space for community programs and serves as an archive for Chicago institutions of older eras. This includes Dr. Wax Records and 8,000 LPs consisting of the final inventory from a former nearby record store. The rest of the house will be converted into areas for reading and other library-style purposes.
