= Moneta Sleet Jr. =

American journalist (1926–1996)

Moneta John Sleet Jr.
- Born: Moneta John Sleet Jr. February 14, 1926; Owensboro, Kentucky, U.S.
- Died: September 30, 1996 (aged 70); Baldwin, New York, U.S.
- Resting place: Calverton National Cemetery
- Occupation: Press photographer
- Years active: 1955–1996
- Known for: Photography

Moneta J. Sleet Jr. (February 14, 1926 – September 30, 1996) was an American press photographer best known for his work as a staff photographer for Ebony magazine. In 1969 he was awarded the Pulitzer Prize for Feature Photography for his photograph of Coretta Scott King, Martin Luther King Jr.'s widow, at her husband's funeral. Sleet was the first African-American man to win the Pulitzer, and the first African American to win the award for journalism. He died of cancer in 1996 at the age of 70.

== Early life and education ==
Sleet was born in Owensboro, Kentucky. He was editor of the school newspaper at Western High School, his alma mater. He graduated cum laude from Kentucky State College (now Kentucky State University), a historically black college, in 1947 and went on to obtain a master's degree in journalism from New York University (NYU) in 1950. He also studied at the School of Modern Photography where he furthered his photography skills. During this same time Sleet served in an all-African American unit in World War II and was an assistant at a commercial operated studio. After his education at NYU he was a sports journalist for the Amsterdam News in New York and then John P. Davis' magazine Our World.

== Ebony magazine ==
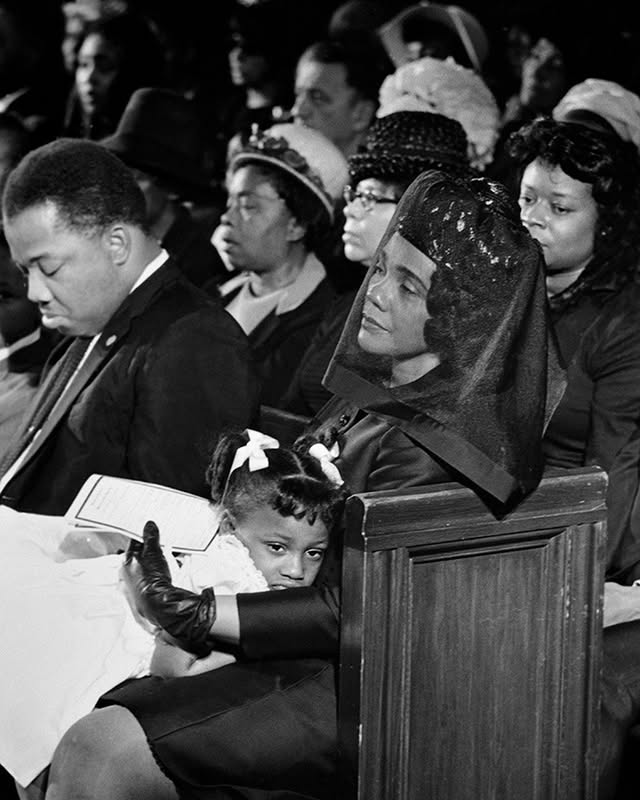
Sleet's Pulitzer Prize-winning photograph of Coretta Scott King and Bernice King at Martin Luther King's funeral

Sleet began working for Ebony magazine in 1955. Over the next 41 years, he captured photos of young Muhammad Ali, Dizzy Gillespie, Stevie Wonder, Emperor Haile Selassie I, Jomo Kenyatta, former ambassador Andrew Young in a blue leather jacket and jeans in his office at the United Nations, Ghana's Kwame Nkrumah, Liberia's William Tubman and Billie Holiday. He gained the affection and esteem of many civil rights leaders, many of whom called on him by name. When Coretta Scott King found out that no African American photographers had been assigned to cover her husband's funeral service, she demanded that Sleet be a part of the press pool. If he was not, she threatened to bar all photographers from the service. Besides his photo of Coretta Scott King, he also captured grieving widow Betty Shabazz at the funeral of her husband Malcolm X. A collection of his photographs in book form, Special Moments in African-American History, 1955-1996: the Photographs of Moneta Sleet, Jr., Ebony Magazine's Pulitzer Prize Winner, was published posthumously in 1998. In 2018, the artist Theaster Gates created an archive of photographs by Sleet and fellow Johnson photographer Isaac Sutton work entitled Black Image Corporation. The archive was exhibited at the Osservatorio of the Fondazione Prada.

== Civil Rights Movement ==
During Sleet's 41 years at Ebony, he also worked by Martin Luther King Jr.’s side for 13 years, capturing historical moments of the civil rights movement. A famous image of Rosa Parks, MLK, Ralph Abernathy, Ralph Bunche, and Coretta Scott King leading marchers was captured by Moneta. He also captured images of MLK's I Have a Dream speech at the Lincoln Memorial, the march from Selma to Montgomery, and the Montgomery bus boycott.

Sleet's work was included in the 2025 exhibition Photography and the Black Arts Movement, 1955–1985 at the National Gallery of Art.

== Personal life ==
Sleet married his wife Juanita in 1950 and had two sons and one daughter: Gregory M. Sleet, a judge who used to be on the United States District Court for the District of Delaware, Lisa, and Michael Sleet. He had three grandchildren: Ashlee Evertsz, Moneta Sleet III, and Kelsi Sleet. Sleet was also a member of Sigma Pi Phi, the oldest African-American Greek-lettered organization, along with MLK. He was a part of an overseas press club so he took a lot of pictures of international world leaders.

== Death ==
Sleet, while a resident of Baldwin, New York, died of cancer at Columbia-Presbyterian Medical Center on September 30, 1996.

== See also ==
- List of photographers of the civil rights movement
