= Black Vessel for a Saint =

Sculptural piece

Black Vessel for a Saint is sculptural piece commissioned and completed in 2017 by Theaster Gates for the Minneapolis Sculpture Garden in Minneapolis, Minnesota. The piece consists of a life-size statue of St. Laurence painted black and enclosed in a black cylinder, and served as Gates's first permanent outdoor commission.

== History ==
=== Commission ===
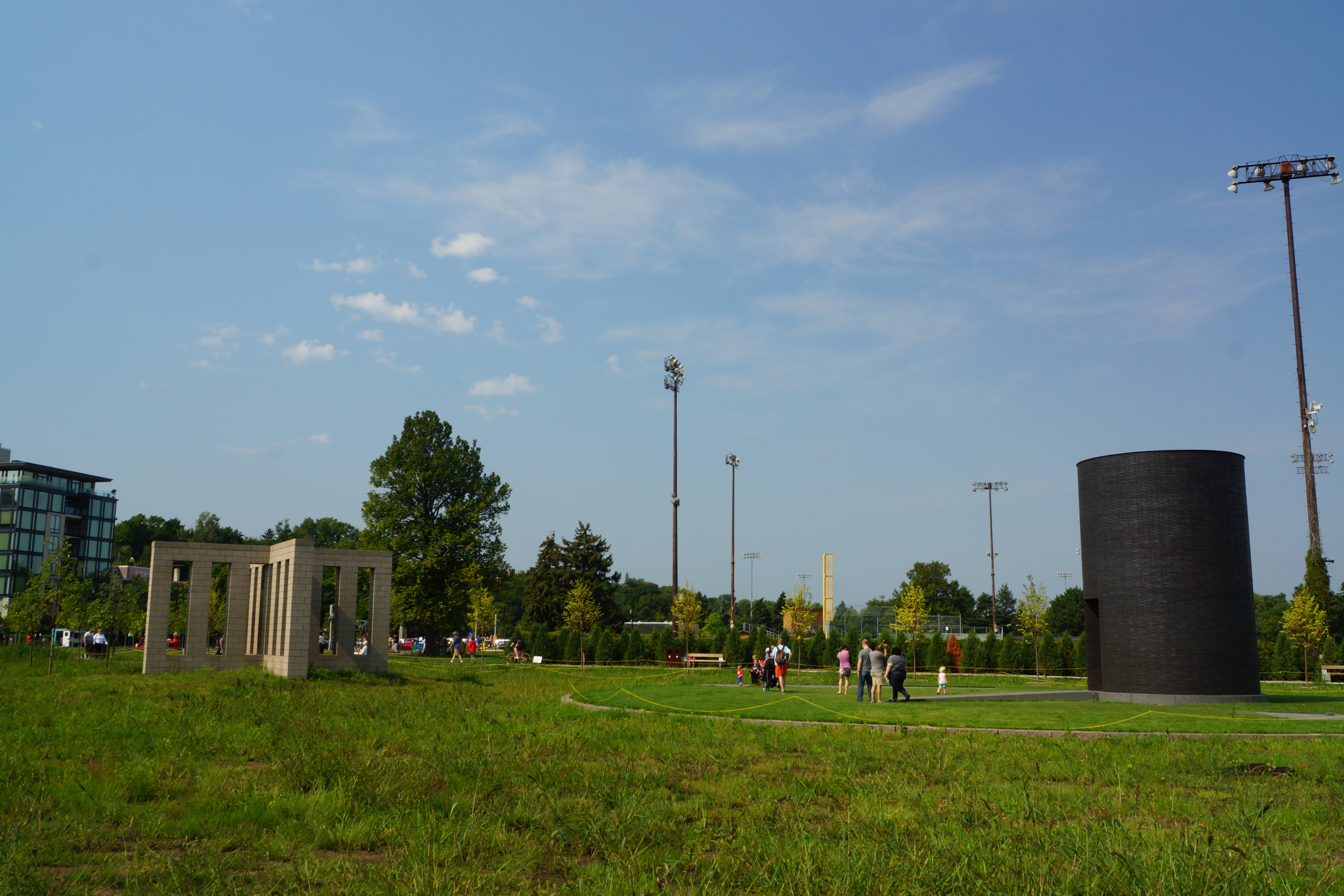
Black Vessel for a Saint in the Minneapolis Sculpture Garden

In 2016, the Minneapolis Sculpture Garden commenced a major renovation program designed to transform the current park into a more sustainable and "civic-minded" space, while simultaneously adding more works to diversify the representation of artists within the park. While the diversification focused on female artists in particular, Theaster Gates's previous work on renovation pieces in Chicago brought him to the Garden's attention as an artist exemplifying a "civic-minded" strategy. Within a year, Gates was commissioned to construct Black Vessel for a Saint, completing construction of the exterior just in time for the Garden's reopening on June 10, 2017. As a deliberately meditative space, Black Vessel for a Saint was strategically placed near similar pieces like Kris Martin's Bell For Whom in order to cultivate an area of reflection and meditation. The piece's central component - a black statue of St. Laurence - was then inserted through the roof of the exterior vessel via a crane.

=== St. Laurence ===
While the exterior of Black Vessel for a Saint was constructed by Gates, the piece's interior component - the component for which the piece is named - consists of a salvaged statue of St. Laurence from the now-demolished Church of St. Laurence in Gates's own Chicago neighborhood. As the church was demolished, Gates continued to buy pieces of its remains to be used in later works, with the final two pieces being the church's bell, and its 6-foot tall statue of St. Laurence. Seeking a home for the life-size statue, Gates temporarily displayed St. Laurence in Venice, Italy, and Bregenz, Austria, before receiving his commission for the Minneapolis Sculpture Garden in 2017. Seeing his new commission as a perfect opportunity to find St. Laurence a permanent home, Gates added the statue to the exterior vessel's center just before the Garden's reopening in June 2017.

== Design and construction ==
The exterior vessel of Black Vessel for a Saint is modeled after a Roman Tempietto, and is composed of black bricks custom-made by Gates himself. Gates is known for often collecting materials from condemned or demolished buildings in low-resource areas of Chicago, and thus he turned to this collection as a source of salvaged bricks for the Tempietto. These salvaged bricks - many coming from the same demolished church as the piece's central St. Laurence statue - were then ground down and painted black. While the piece was originally designed without its central statue, Gates decided mid-construction that his statue of St. Laurence - still without a permanent home - would make a fitting addition to the piece, and ultimately incorporated the 6-foot statue into the piece by coating it in tar to match the black exterior before lowering into place within the Tempietto using a crane. The entire piece was completed just in time for the Minneapolis Sculpture Garden's reopening on June 10, 2017. The architecture firm Muller & Muller, Ltd. (M2) provided full architectural services for the design development and construction.

== Symbolism and significance ==
=== Interpretation ===
In using the form of a Roman Tempietto, Gates set out to create a sacred space to symbolically "bless" the reopening of the Minneapolis Sculpture Garden, as well as provide visitors with a space for reflection and meditation on their own lives in addition to the problems the piece symbolizes. Forming a triangle with the nearby Basilica of St. Mary and St. Mark's Cathedral, Black Vessel for a Saint is designed to create a "secular-sacred" in incorporating an aspect of formal religion in St. Laurence, while still maintaining its casual, secular feel through its open-air sanctuary design. The piece is heavy with symbolism as well, with its tar-like color designed as an ode to his father, who worked as a roofer, as well as a symbol of protection and rebuilding of forgotten communities. Gates believes that like many under-resourced Chicago communities, the statue of St. Laurence was cast aside and forgotten, and thus the protective layer of tar is meant to serve as a symbolic protection against decay and neglect, just as Gates is working to reverse the decay and neglect seen in many Chicago neighborhoods. In addition, Gates saw the implementation of St. Laurence as particularly fitting for a space of a reflection due to St. Laurence's role as the patron saint of librarians and archivists. With his book and quill in hand, St. Laurence serves as a reminder to never neglect the past, and thus furthers the space as a sanctuary for thought and reflection, just as Gates designed it to be.

=== Impact ===
Gates has historically focused on the repurposing of materials and revival of communities, with many of his past works, most famously his undertaking at the Dorchester Projects, focused on functionality and tangible improvement of communities. Thus, in creating Black Vessel for a Saint, Gates set out to create a piece with symbolic significance for the Minneapolis Sculpture Garden, while simultaneously impacting the world in a positive way through its creation. In undertaking the difficult task of repurposing the salvaged materials into the piece's black brick, Gates estimated he employed between 200 and 500 workers in southern and western Chicago. While Black Vessel for a Saint represented Gates's first time using these black bricks, he plans to continue to use more in future works, and intends to start a brick production program at his Chicago studio to continue to employ local Chicago residents through his work.

== External sources ==
- Koenig, Wendy. "13TH BALLAD". The International review of African American art. (2014): 60–61.
- Viso, Olga. "Cultivating the Garden for Art". walkerart.org.
- Sung, Victoria. "Creating Space for the Possibility of a Sacred Moment: Theaster Gates Discusses Black Vessel for a Saint". walkerart.org.
- "Archive or Art: Theaster Gates's First Major US Exhibition Opens". Art & Object.
- Eler, Alicia. “Chicago Artist Theaster Gates Takes Care of All the Forgotten Stuff.” Star Tribune, Minneapolis Star Tribune, 6 Sept. 2019, www.startribune.com/chicago-artist-theaster-gates-takes-care-of-all-the-forgotten-stuff/559480422/.
