= Stony Island Trust and Savings Bank Building =

- U.S. National Register of Historic Places
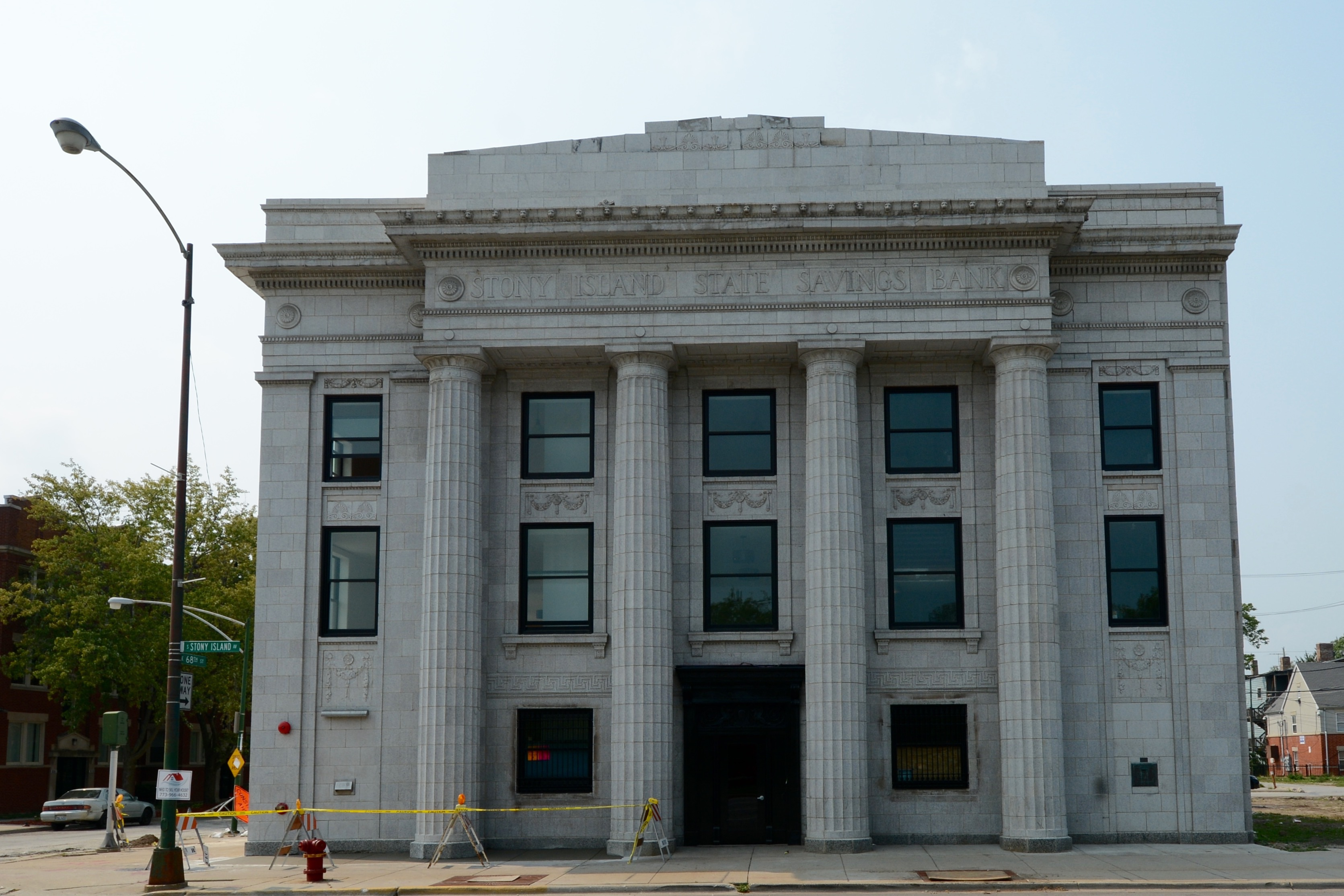

- Location within Chicago metropolitan area Location within Illinois Location within the United States
- Location: 6760 S. Stony Island Ave., Chicago, Illinois
- Coordinates: 41°46′18″N 87°35′12″W
- Built: 1923
- Architect: William Gibbons Uffendell
- Architectural style: Neoclassical
- NRHP reference No.: 13001002
- Added to NRHP: November 15, 2013

The Stony Island Trust and Savings Bank Building is a historic bank building at 6760 S. Stony Island Avenue in the South Shore neighborhood of Chicago, Illinois. The building opened in 1923 for the Stony Island Trust and Savings Bank, which was founded in 1917 and had outgrown its first building. The bank was one of Chicago's many neighborhood banks in the early twentieth century; as Illinois law at the time barred banks from opening branches, smaller standalone banks provided the residents and businesses of Chicago's outlying neighborhoods with nearby banking services.

Architect William Gibbons Uffendell designed the bank in the Neoclassical style, by far the most popular for bank buildings at the time. Uffendell's design features a granite exterior, a temple front with four Doric columns, and an entablature topped by a parapet. The bank folded in 1931 as the Great Depression disrupted the city's banking industry; for the remainder of the 20th century, the building was alternately used by other banks and left vacant for extended periods.

The building was added to the National Register of Historic Places on November 15, 2013. It is now home to the Stony Island Arts Bank, an art gallery and library.
