= List of most expensive paintings =

Paintings sold for the highest price

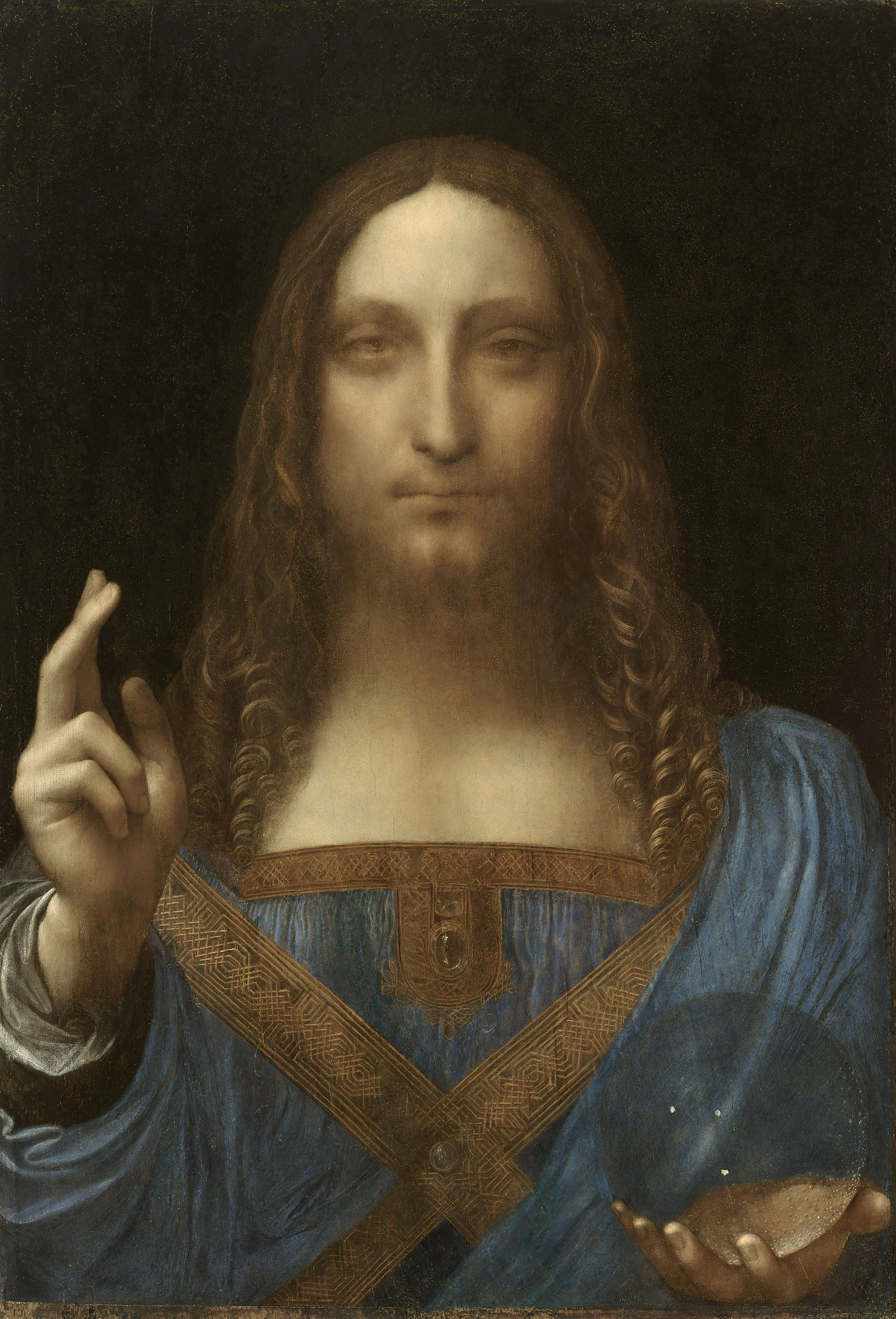
Salvator Mundi attributed to Italian artist Leonardo da Vinci (c. 1500)

This is a list of the highest known prices paid for paintings. The record payment for a work is approximately US$450.3 million (which includes commission) for the work Salvator Mundi (c. 1500) generally considered to be by Leonardo da Vinci, though this is disputed. The painting was sold in November 2017, through the auction house Christie's in New York City.

== Background ==
The most famous paintings, especially old master works created before 1803, are generally owned or held by museums for viewing by patrons. Since museums rarely sell them, they are considered priceless. Guinness World Records lists Leonardo da Vinci's Mona Lisa as having the highest insurance value for a painting. On permanent display at the Louvre in Paris, the Mona Lisa was assessed at US$100 million on 14 December 1962. Taking only inflation into account, the 1962 value would be around US$1.1 billion in 2025.

The earliest sale on the list below (Vase with Fifteen Sunflowers by Vincent van Gogh) is from March 1987; with a price of £24.75 million (£71.6 million in 2025 currency). This sale tripled the previous record, and introduced a new era in top art sales. Before this, the highest absolute price paid for a painting was £8.1 million (£24.2 million in 2025 currency) paid by the J. Paul Getty Museum for Andrea Mantegna's Adoration of the Magi at Christie's in London on 18 April 1985. The sale of Vincent van Gogh's Sunflowers was the first time a "modern" (in this case 1888) painting became the record holder. Old master paintings had previously dominated the market. In contrast, there are currently only nine pre-1875 paintings among the listed top 89, and none created between 1635 and 1874.

An exceptional case is graffiti artist David Choe, who accepted payment in shares for painting graffiti art in the headquarters of a fledgling Facebook. His shares were of limited value when he was given them, but by the time of Facebook's IPO they were valued at around $200 million.

The Red Vineyard (1888), the only painting the Dutch painter Vincent van Gogh sold during his lifetime which is documented. It was sold for 400 francs (US$2,765 in 2025).

The list is incomplete with respect to sales between private parties, as these are not always reported and, even if they are, details like the purchase price may remain secret. For example, on June 25, 2019, the American hedge fund manager J. Tomilson Hill bought a recently rediscovered Judith and Holofernes (1607) attributed to Caravaggio, two days before it would have been auctioned in Toulouse. Though the Louvre Museum had turned down the opportunity to purchase it for €100 million, the painting was estimated to sell for $110 to $170 million. The actual purchase price was not disclosed, because of a confidentiality agreement attached to the private sale. Another example is a 2019 sale of The Seated Zouave by Vincent van Gogh. According to some sources, the painting had been sold by Argentine art collector Nelly Arrieta de Blaquier for $300 million, but the price was not confirmed by any of the parties involved.

Vincent van Gogh, Pablo Picasso, and Andy Warhol are the best-represented artists in the list. Whereas Picasso and Warhol became wealthy men, van Gogh is known to have sold only one painting in his lifetime, The Red Vineyard, for 400 French francs (approximately $2,900 in 2026 U.S. dollars) in 1890, to the Belgian impressionist painter and heiress Anna Boch. Frida Kahlo holds the record for the highest price paid for a painting by a woman. On November 21, 2025 at Sotheby's, an unnamed buyer acquired 1940's "El Sueño" for US$54.7 million beating the 2014's purchase by the Crystal Bridges Museum of American Art of the 1932 painting Jimson Weed/White Flower No. 1 by Georgia O'Keeffe for US $44.4 million (equivalent to US$60.4 million in 2025).

In 2025, Frida Kahlo broke the previously held record by Georgia O'Keeffe for the highest price paid for a painting by a woman.

Among the listed top paintings, only seven are by non-Western artists. Five are traditional Chinese paintings by Qi Baishi, Wu Bin, Wang Meng and Xu Yang. In particular, Qi Baishi's Twelve Landscape Screens was sold for $140.8 million in 2017. The only non-Western modern artwork listed is that of the Chinese-French painter Zao Wouki's oil painting Juin-Octobre 1985, which was sold for $65 million in 2018. Also included in this list is Chinese painter Wang Shaofei's The High Sun, which was sold at an estimated price of $74 million in 2017.

== List of highest prices paid ==
This list is ordered by consumer price index inflation-adjusted value (in bold) in millions of United States dollars in 2025. (Note: The Wikipedia template uses a yearly average inflation. Using monthly averages gives slightly different numbers, most significantly for paintings sold early or late in a year with significant inflation.) Where necessary, the price is first converted to dollars using the exchange rate at the time the painting was sold. The inflation adjustment may change as recent inflation rates are often revised. A list in another currency may be in a slightly different order due to exchange-rate fluctuations. Paintings are listed only once, i.e., for the highest price sold.

Adjusted (million USD)	Original (million USD)	Name	Image	Artist	Year	Date of sale	Rank at sale	Seller	Buyer	Auction house
$591.5	$450.3	Salvator Mundi		Leonardo da Vinci (attribution disputed)	c. 1500	November 15, 2017	1	Dmitry Rybolovlev	Badr bin Abdullah Al Saud (Note: Badr bin Abdullah allegedly bought Salvator Mundi on behalf of the Abu Dhabi Department of Culture & Tourism, but it has since been posited that he may have been a stand-in bidder for Saudi Arabian crown prince Mohammed bin Salman.)	Christie's, New York
~$407	~$300	Interchange		Willem de Kooning	1955	September 2015	1	David Geffen Foundation	Kenneth C. Griffin	Private sale
$358 +	$250 + (Note: Exact price (even the currency of sale) is not known, with estimates from $250 million to $300 million)	The Card Players		Paul Cézanne	1892/93	April 2011	1	George Embiricos	State of Qatar	Private sale
$285	$210	Nafea Faa Ipoipo (When Will You Marry?)		Paul Gauguin	1892	September 2014	2	Rudolf Staechelin heirs	State of Qatar	Private sale
~$272	~$200	Number 17A		Jackson Pollock	1948	September 2015	4	David Geffen Foundation	Kenneth C. Griffin	Private sale
$254	$183.8	Wasserschlangen II		Gustav Klimt	1904–1907	2013	2	Yves Bouvier	Dmitry Rybolovlev	Private sale (Note: Within weeks after a private viewing in Vienna in September 2012, Rybolovlev agreed to pay $183.8 million via his dealer Bouvier. At the same time, Bouvier was negotiating and eventually succeeded to buy the painting for $112 million from Ursula Ucicky, widow of Gustav Ucicky (the illegitimate son of Gustav Klimt and one of his models). Ucicky shared half with the heirs of the Jewish family from whom the painting had been seized in 1939. After The Bouvier Affair unfolded, Rybolovlev resold the painting for $170 million in November 2015.)
$253	$186 (€140)	No. 6 (Violet, Green and Red)		Mark Rothko	1951	August 2014	3	Cherise Moueix	Dmitry Rybolovlev	Private sale via Yves Bouvier
$244	$180 (€160 million)	Pendant portraits of Maerten Soolmans and Oopjen Coppit		Rembrandt	1634	February 1, 2016	7	Éric de Rothschild	Rijksmuseum and Louvre	Private sale
$243.6	$179.4	Les Femmes d'Alger ("Version O")		Pablo Picasso	1955	May 11, 2015	5	Private collection	Hamad bin Jassim bin Jaber Al Thani	Christie's, New York
$236.4	$236.4	Portrait of Elisabeth Lederer		Gustav Klimt	1914-1916	November 18, 2025	10	Estate of Leonard Lauder		Sotheby's, New York
$235.3	$198 (€175)	The Standard Bearer		Rembrandt	1636	February 2022	10	Rothschild family	Rijksmuseum	Private sale
$231.5	$170.4	Nu couché		Amedeo Modigliani	1917/18	November 9, 2015	9	Laura Mattioli Rossi	Liu Yiqian	Christie's, New York
$223.6	$140	No. 5, 1948		Jackson Pollock	1948	November 2, 2006	1	David Geffen	David Martinez	Private sale via Sotheby's
$219.6	$137.5	Woman III		Willem de Kooning	1953	November 18, 2006	2	David Geffen	Steven A. Cohen	Private sale via Larry Gagosian
$216.7	$165.0	Masterpiece		Roy Lichtenstein	1962	January 2017	12	Agnes Gund	Steven A. Cohen	Private sale
$215.6	$135	Portrait of Adele Bloch-Bauer I		Gustav Klimt	1907	June 18, 2006	1	Maria Altmann	Ronald Lauder, Neue Galerie	Private sale via Christie's
$214.5	$195	Shot Sage Blue Marilyn		Andy Warhol	1964	May 9, 2022	11	Thomas and Doris Ammann	Larry Gagosian	Christie's, New York
$214.2	$155	Le Rêve		Pablo Picasso	1932	March 26, 2013	6	Steve Wynn	Steven A. Cohen	Private sale
$203.3	$82.5	Portrait of Dr. Gachet		Vincent van Gogh	1890	May 15, 1990	1	Siegfried Kramarsky heirs	Ryoei Saito (Note: Some fear existed, that Portrait of Dr. Gachet had been cremated with the owner in 1996, but Gachet's portrait was privately resold to Wolfgang Flöttl in 1997 or 1998 for $65–$90 million through Sotheby’s. Before 2007, Flöttl had sold it for $100 million to an unknown buyer.)	Christie's, New York
$201.6	$157.2	Nu couché (sur le côté gauche)		Amedeo Modigliani	1917	May 15, 2018		Ezra and David Nahmad		Sotheby's, New York
$201.2	$150	Portrait of Adele Bloch-Bauer II		Gustav Klimt	1912	2016	10	Oprah Winfrey (Note: Oprah Winfrey had bought the painting in November 2006 at Christie's for nearly $88 million. At that time this was the 4th highest (unadjusted) price at auction and 10th highest price on this list.)	Unidentified buyer in China	Private sale via Larry Gagosian
$196.8	$142.4	Three Studies of Lucian Freud		Francis Bacon	1969	November 12, 2013	8	(Note: The triptych had probably been reassembled by the Italian collector Francesco De Simone Niquesa, but were resold to a person in the US before 2013)	Elaine Wynn, ex-wife of Steve Wynn	Christie's, New York
$192.5	$78.1	Bal du moulin de la Galette (Note: This is the small version of the painting; the large version is at the Musée d'Orsay.)		Pierre-Auguste Renoir	1876	May 17, 1990	2	Betsey Whitney	Ryoei Saito (Note: Privately resold for ca. $50 million through Sotheby’s in 1997.)	Sotheby's, New York
$190.4	$190.4	Blossoming Chestnut Trees		Vincent van Gogh	1890	November 18, 2026		The Blaquier-Arrieta family (Argentina)		Sotheby's, New York
$184.9	$140.8 (¥931.5)	Twelve Landscape Screens		Qi Baishi	1925	December 17, 2017				Beijing Poly Auction
$181.2	$181.2	Number 7A		Jackson Pollock	1948	May 18, 2026		Samuel Irving Newhouse Jr.		Christie’s, New York
$177.6	$104.2	Garçon à la pipe		Pablo Picasso	1905	May 5, 2004	3	Greentree Foundation (Whitney family)	Guido Barilla (suspected)	Sotheby's, New York
$177.3	$149.2	Les Poseuses, Ensemble (Petite version)		Georges Seurat	1888	November 9, 2022	1	Paul G. Allen		Christie's, New York
$168.2	$119.9	The Scream (Note: One of two pastel versions; another two painted versions (and lithography) exist, all created by Munch.)		Edvard Munch	1895	May 2, 2012	8	Petter Olsen	Leon Black	Sotheby's, New York
$165.9	$120	Otahi		Paul Gauguin	1893	2013	10	Yves Bouvier	Dmitry Rybolovlev	Private sale (Note: Rybolovlev resold Gauguin's Otahi before 2017 for less than $50 million.)
$165	$118	Reclining Nude With Blue Cushion		Amedeo Modigliani	1916	2012	8	Steven A. Cohen	Dmitry Rybolovlev	Private sale via Yves Bouvier
$164	$137.7	La Montagne Sainte-Victoire		Paul Cézanne	1888-1890	November 9, 2022	2	Paul G. Allen		Christie's, New York
$162.4	$110.0	Flag (Note: This stands as the most expensive painting by a living artist.)		Jasper Johns	1958	March 2010	7	Jean-Christophe Castelli	Steven A. Cohen	Private sale, estimated price
$157.2	$106.5	Nude, Green Leaves and Bust		Pablo Picasso	1932	May 4, 2010	9	Frances Lasker Brody estate	Leonard Blavatnik (suspected)	Christie's, New York
$155.8	$58 plus exchange of works (Note: The paintings transferred to the dealers include a late Monet entitled Corona (Water Lilies) from around 1920; Renoir's Reclining Nude of 1902; Kandinsky's Autumn Landscape, Murnau from 1908, and Picasso's Striped Bodice from September 1943.)	Portrait of Joseph Roulin		Vincent van Gogh	1889	August 1, 1989	1	Private collection, Zürich	Museum of Modern Art New York	Private sale via Thomas Ammann, Fine Art Zurich
$153.9	$107.5	L’Homme assis au verre		Pablo Picasso	1914	May 2011		Yves Bouvier (Note: Probably the same day before the sale bought by Yves Bouvier for 62 million.)	Dmitry Rybolovlev	Private sale via Yves Bouvier
$152.7	$53.9	Irises		Vincent van Gogh	1889	November 11, 1987	1	John Whitney Payson, son of Joan Whitney Payson	Alan Bond (Note: Alan Bond could not pay off the painting, and Irises was resold (probably for somewhat less) to the Getty Museum.)	Sotheby's, New York
$152.1	$95.2	Dora Maar au Chat		Pablo Picasso	1941	May 3, 2006	6	Gidwitz family	Boris Ivanishvili	Sotheby's, New York
$149.5	$100.0	Eight Elvises		Andy Warhol	1963	October 2008	10	Annibale Berlingieri	The State of Qatar (suspected)	Private sale via Philippe Ségalot
$147.4	$115	Young Girl with a Flower Basket		Pablo Picasso	1905	May 8, 2018		David and Peggy Rockefeller	The Nahmad family	Christie's, New York
$147.2	$139.3	Femme à la montre		Pablo Picasso	1932	November 9, 2023		Emily Fisher Landau's estate	Anonymous buyer	Sotheby's, New York
$146.1 +	$105.7 + (Note: Price excludes sales commission and other costs.) (¥10,300)	Anna's Light		Barnett Newman	1968	October 4, 2013		DIC Corp.		Private sale
$145.7	$105.4	Silver Car Crash (Double Disaster)		Andy Warhol	1963	November 13, 2013				Sotheby's, New York
$145.1	$110.5	Untitled		Jean-Michel Basquiat	1982	May 18, 2017		Emily and Jerry Spiegel	Yusaku Maezawa	Sotheby's, New York
$141.2	$71.5	Portrait de l'artiste sans barbe		Vincent van Gogh	1889	November 19, 1998	5	Jacques Koerfer heirs		Christie's, New York
$139.4	$110.7	Meules		Claude Monet	1890	May 14, 2019			Hasso Plattner	Sotheby's, New York
$139.2	$117.1	Verger avec cyprès		Vincent van Gogh	1888	November 9, 2022	3	Paul G. Allen		Christie's, New York
$138	$100	La Montagne Sainte-Victoire vue du bosquet du Château Noir		Paul Cézanne	1904	2013 (Note: Exact date of sale is not known.)		Edsel and Eleanor Ford House	State of Qatar	Private sale
$137.3	$76.7 (£49.5)	Massacre of the Innocents		Peter Paul Rubens	1611	July 10, 2002	6	an Austrian family	Kenneth Thomson (Note: Later in 2002, Thomson donated his private collection, including the Rubens, to the Art Gallery of Ontario)	Sotheby's, London
$129.5	$95.4	Nurse		Roy Lichtenstein	1964	November 9, 2015				Christie's, New York
$129	$86.3	Triptych, 1976		Francis Bacon	1976	May 14, 2008		Jean-Pierre Moueix heirs	Roman Abramovich	Sotheby's, New York
$128.1	$49.3 (F300)	Les Noces de Pierrette		Pablo Picasso	1905	November 30, 1989	3	Fredrik Roos	Tomonori Tsurumaki	Binoche et Godeau Paris
$127.8	$80.0	False Start		Jasper Johns	1959	October 12, 2006	11	David Geffen	Kenneth C. Griffin	Private sale via Richard Gray
$127.1	$85 (€54)	Te Fare		Paul Gauguin	1892	June 2008		Yves Bouvier	Dmitry Rybolovlev	Private sale (Note: Rybolovlev resold Te Fare in February 2017 at Christie's in London for $25 million.)
$127	$57	A Wheatfield with Cypresses		Vincent van Gogh	1889	May 1993	6	Emil Georg Bührle's son	Walter H. Annenberg (Note: Annenberg subsequently donated it to the Metropolitan Museum of Art.)	Private sale via Steven Mazoh
$125.9	$100	Boy and Dog in a Johnnypump		Jean-Michel Basquiat	1982	2020		Peter Brant	Ken Griffin	Private sale
$125.6	$105.7	Maternité II		Paul Gauguin	1899	November 9, 2022	4	Paul G. Allen		Christie's, New York
$124.3	$47.8	Yo, Picasso		Pablo Picasso	1901	May 9, 1989	2	Wendell Cherry	Stavros Niarchos	Sotheby's, New York
$124.2	$104.5	Birch Forest		Gustav Klimt	1903	November 9, 2022	5	Paul G. Allen		Christie's, New York
$124.2	$80.0	Turquoise Marilyn		Andy Warhol	1964	May 20, 2007		Stefan Edlis	Steven A. Cohen	Private sale via Larry Gagosian
$124.3	$121.2	The Empire of Light		René Magritte	1954	November 19, 2024	1	Mica Ertegun		Christie's, New York
$122.9	$103.4	Femme assise près d’une fenêtre (Marie-Thérèse)		Pablo Picasso	1932	May 13, 2021				Christie's, New York
$122.5	$70.0	Portrait of Alfonso d'Avalos with a Page		Titian	1533	November 2003	10	Axa insurance company	Getty Museum	Private sale via Hervé Aaron
$121.8	$86.9	Orange, Red, Yellow		Mark Rothko	1961	May 8, 2012		David Pincus estate		Christie's, New York
$120.5	$80.5 (£40.9)	Le Bassin aux Nymphéas		Claude Monet	1919	June 24, 2008		J. Irwin and Xenia S. Miller	Andrey Melnichenko	Christie's, London
$117.8	$91.9	Chop Suey		Edward Hopper	1929	November 13, 2018		Barney A. Ebsworth estate		Christie's, New York
$116.9	$60.5	Rideau, Cruchon et Compotier		Paul Cézanne	1894	May 10, 1999	9	Whitney Family (Note: Steve Wynn, who bid on the painting at auction, privately acquired the work several months later from the unidentified buyer for an undisclosed, supposedly lower price. Kenneth Griffin acquired it in 2004 from Wynn.)		Sotheby's, New York
$115.8	$90.3	Portrait of an Artist (Pool with Two Figures)		David Hockney	1972	November 15, 2018			Pierre Chen	Christie's, New York
$114.5	$108.4 (£85.3)	Lady with a Fan		Gustav Klimt	1917-8	June 27, 2023			Patti Wong, on behalf of a Hong Kong buyer	Sotheby's, London
$114.5	$84.2	Black Fire I		Barnett Newman	1961	May 13, 2014		Private Collection	Anonymous	Christie's, New York
$113.1	$72.8	White Center (Yellow, Pink and Lavender on Rose)		Mark Rothko	1950	May 15, 2007		David Rockefeller, Sr.	Sheikh Hamad bin Khalifa Al-Thani	Sotheby's, New York
$112.4	$39.7 (£24.75)	Vase with Fifteen Sunflowers		Vincent van Gogh	1889	March 30, 1987	1	Helen Beatty, daughter-in-law of Chester Beatty	Yasuo Goto, Yasuda Comp./Sompo Holdings	Christie's, London
$111.8	$88.8	Buffalo II		Robert Rauschenberg	1964	May 15, 2019		Robert and Beatrice Mayer Estate	Alice Walton	Christie's, New York
$111.4	$81.9	Triple Elvis		Andy Warhol	1963	November 12, 2014		WestSpiel		Christie's, New York
$111.4	$71.7	Green Car Crash (Green Burning Car I)		Andy Warhol	1963	May 16, 2007		Private collection, Zürich	Philip Niarchos	Christie's, New York
$111.3	$81.9	No. 10		Mark Rothko	1958	May 13, 2015				Christie's, New York
$111	$111.0	Arlequin		Paul Cézanne	1888-1890	November 18, 2026		The Blaquier-Arrieta family (Argentina)		Sotheby's, New York
$110.6	$93.1	In This Case		Jean-Michel Basquiat	1983	May 11, 2021		Giancarlo Giammetti	Private collector	Christie's, New York
$110	$85.8	Suprematist Composition		Kazimir Malevich	1916	May 15, 2018		The Nahmad family	Anonymous	Christie's, New York (Note: The Nahmad family bought Suprematist Composition in 2008 at Sotheby's, New York, for $60,002,500 ($90 million in 2025 dollars) from the heirs of Kazimir Malevich.)
$109.9	$80.8	Three Studies for a Portrait of John Edwards		Francis Bacon	1984	May 13, 2014		Private Collection	Anonymous	Christie's, New York.
$109.5	$92.2	Portrait of a Young Man holding a Roundel		Sandro Botticelli	c. 1480	January 21, 2021		Sheldon Solow estate	Russian private collector	Sotheby's, New York
$109.3	$81.4	Meule		Claude Monet	1891	November 16, 2016				Christie's, New York
$108.6	$84.7	Nymphéas en fleur		Claude Monet	1914–1917	May 8, 2018		David and Peggy Rockefeller	Xin Li-Cohen	Christie's, New York
~$107	~$75 (€50–60) (Note: Usually estimated at "over €50 M" or "between 50 and 60 million Euros". On July 12, 2011, $75M was equivalent to €53M.)	Darmstadt Madonna		Hans Holbein	1526	July 12, 2011		Donatus, Landgrave of Hesse	Reinhold Würth	Private sale via Christoph Graf Douglas
$106.8	$81.3	Laboureur dans un champ		Vincent van Gogh	1889	November 13, 2017		Nancy Lee and Perry R. Bass estate		Christie's, New York
$106.5	$84.55	Triptych Inspired by the Oresteia of Aeschylus		Francis Bacon	1981	June 30, 2020		Hans Rasmus Astrup		Sotheby's, New York
$106	$70.6 (£50)	Diana and Actaeon		Titian	1556–1559	February 1, 2009		Duke of Sutherland	National Galleries of Scotland & National Gallery, London	Private sale
$105.7	$40.7	Au Lapin Agile		Pablo Picasso	1904	November 27, 1989	5	Linda de Roulet, daughter of Joan Whitney Payson	Walter H. Annenberg	Sotheby's, New York
$105.6	$68	The Gross Clinic		Thomas Eakins	1875	April 12, 2007		Thomas Jefferson University	Philadelphia Museum of Art	Private sale
$105.4	$75.1	No 1 (Royal Red and Blue)		Mark Rothko	1954	November 13, 2012		John and Anne Marion		Sotheby's, New York
$104.9	$38.5 (£20.9)	Acrobate et jeune arlequin (Acrobat and Young Harlequin) (Note: Re-sold for £12m to Stavros Niarchos in 1993.)		Pablo Picasso	1905	November 28, 1988	3	Roger Janssen heirs? (Note: A Belgian banker and collector who bought it in 1939 for $18,000. His was the last name on the 1988 provenance list; painting came from "a private collection in Arizona")	Mitsukoshi	Christie's, London
$103.5	$80.8	Odalisque couchée aux magnolias		Henri Matisse	1923	May 8, 2018		David and Peggy Rockefeller	Xin Li-Cohen	Christie's, New York
$102.8	$55.0	Femme aux Bras Croisés		Pablo Picasso	1902	November 8, 2000		Chauncey McCormick heirs		Christie's, New York
$101.8	$69.0	Nude Sitting on a Divan		Amedeo Modigliani	1917	November 2, 2010		Halit Cıngıllıoglu		Sotheby's, New York
$101.4	$63.5	Police Gazette		Willem de Kooning	1955	October 12, 2006		David Geffen	Steven A. Cohen	Private sale via Richard Gray.
$101	$85	Untitled		Jean-Michel Basquiat	1982	May 18, 2022		Yusaku Maezawa	Taiwanese collector	Philips, New York
$100.6	$71.7 (£45)	Diana and Callisto		Titian	1556–1559	March 2, 2012		Duke of Sutherland	National Galleries of Scotland & National Gallery, London	Private sale
$98.4	$98.4	No. 15		Mark Rothko	1964	May 18, 2026		Agnes Gund		Christie's, New York
$97.2	$74	The High Sun		Wang Shaofei	2007	May 2017		Legal entity of a prominent Japanese collector family	Anonymous (private collection represented by an international institution)	Private sale
$95.8	$70.5	Untitled (New York City)		Cy Twombly	1968	November 11, 2015		Sydney M. Irmas heirs		Sotheby's, New York
$95.8	$77 (¥512.9)	Ten Views Of Lingbi Rock		Wu Bin	1610	October 20, 2020		William Bernard Ziff Jr. heirs		Beijing Poly Auction
$95.7	$49.5	Femme assise dans un jardin		Pablo Picasso	1938	November 10, 1999		Robert Saidenberg (Note: Son of Daniel (conductor & cellist) and Eleanore Saidenberg who were Picasso's New York dealers from 1955 to 1973.)		Sotheby's, New York
$95.4	$70.2 (£42.2)	Portrait of George Dyer Talking		Francis Bacon	1966	February 13, 2014				Christie's, London
$95.3	$47.5	Peasant Woman Against a Background of Wheat		Vincent van Gogh	1890	1997	11		Steve Wynn (Note: On Oct. 7, 2005, The New York Times reported that Steven Cohen bought van Gogh's "Peasant Woman Against a Background of Wheat" and Gauguin's "Bathers" (1903) from Steve Wynn for approximately $110 million, though guesses range from $100–150 million. One or both of the paintings may thus occur higher on this list.)	Private sale via Acquavella Galleries Inc., New York
$94.9	$86.3	Large Interior, W11 (after Watteau)		Lucian Freud	1982	November 9, 2022		Paul Allen		Christie's, New York
$94.7	$69.6	Untitled		Cy Twombly	1970	November 12, 2014		Nicola del Roscio		Christie's, New York
$94.7	$69.6	Four Marlons		Andy Warhol	1966	November 12, 2014		WestSpiel		Christie's, New York
$94.4	$79.45	The Empire of Lights		René Magritte	1961	February 3, 2022		Anne-Marie Crowet Gillon heirs		Sotheby's, London
$94	$85.4	White Disaster (White Car Crash 19 Times)		Andy Warhol	1963	November 17, 2022				Sotheby's, New York
$93.7	$65.5 (¥425.5)	Eagle Standing on Pine Tree		Qi Baishi	1946	May 22, 2011		Liu Yiqian	Hunan TV & Broadcast; Intermediary Co	China Guardian Auctions
$93.5	$63.4	Men in Her Life		Andy Warhol	1962	November 8, 2010		Jose Mugrabi	Sheikh Hamad bin Khalifa Al-Thani	Phillips de Pury & Company
$92	$70.1	Contraste de formes		Fernand Léger	1913	November 13, 2017		Anna-Maria and Stephen Kellen Foundation		Christie's, New York
$91.6	$67.45	La Gommeuse		Pablo Picasso	1901	November 5, 2015		William I. Koch		Sotheby's, New York.
$91.5	$67.4	Buste de femme (Femme à la résille)		Pablo Picasso	1938	May 11, 2015		Steve Wynn	Joseph Lau	Christie's, New York
$91.4	$35.2	Portrait of a Halberdier		Pontormo	1537	May 31, 1989	5	Chauncey Stillman	Getty Museum	Christie's, New York
$90.1	$66.3	L’Allée des Alyscamps		Vincent van Gogh	1888	May 5, 2015				Sotheby's, New York
$90.1	$66.2	Untitled		Mark Rothko	1952	May 13, 2014		Private Collection	Anonymous	Christie's, New York
$89	$66.3	Untitled XXV		Willem de Kooning	1977	November 15, 2016				Christie's, New York
$88.9	$62.1 (¥402.5)	Zhichuan Resettlement		Wang Meng	1350	June 4, 2011				Beijing Poly Auction
$88.7	$69.2	Femme au béret et à la robe quadrillée (Marie-Thérèse Walter)		Pablo Picasso	1937	February 28, 2018		Private collection	Harry Smith	Sotheby's, London
$88.6	$65.1	Spring		Édouard Manet	1881	November 5, 2014		Oliver Hazard Payne heirs	Getty Museum	Christie's, New York
$88.3	$68.9	Woman as Landscape		Willem de Kooning	1955	November 13, 2018		Barney A. Ebsworth estate		Christie's, New York
$88.3	$61.7	1949-A-No. 1		Clyfford Still	1949	November 9, 2011		City and County of Denver		Sotheby's, New York
$86	$86.0	Blossoming Meadow		Gustav Klimt	c. 1908	November 18, 2025		Estate of Leonard Lauder		Sotheby's, New York
$87.2	$82.5	No. 7		Mark Rothko	1951	February 19, 2023		Private Collection	Laurence Escalante	Private sale
$85.8	$85.8	Brown and Blacks in Reds		Mark Rothko	1957	May 15, 2026		Robert Mnuchin		Sotheby's, New York
$85.8	$85.78	Betonte Ecken		Wassily Kandinsky	1922-1923	November 17, 2026		The Nahmad family		Christie's, New York
$84.8	$71.4	Cabanes de bois parmi les oliviers et cyprès		Vincent van Gogh	1889	November 11, 2021		Edwin L. Cox		Christie's, New York
$83.6	$70.35	Le Bassin Aux Nymphéas (1917-19)		Claude Monet	1917-1919	May 12, 2021		Private Collection, New York, United States		Sotheby's, New York
$83.6	$65.23 (HK$510.371)	Juin-Octobre 1985		Zao Wou-Ki	1985	September 30, 2018		Chang Qiu Dun		Sotheby's, Hong Kong

== Progression of highest prices paid ==
This list shows the progression of the highest price paid for a painting since 1746.

Price	Painting	Image	Artist	Year	Date of sale	Seller	Buyer	Auction house
$0.03 million ($32,500)	Magdalen in the Desert		Antonio da Correggio		1746		Augustus III of Poland	Private sale
$0.04 million (110,000 French francs) ($42,500)	Sistine Madonna		Raphael	c. 1513–1514	1759	Piacenza	Augustus III of Poland	Private sale
$0.08 million (£16,000)	Adoration of the Mystic Lamb		Hubert and Jan van Eyck	1432	1821	Edward Solly	Frederick William III of Prussia	Private sale
$0.12 million (615,300 French francs) (~$120,000)	The Immaculate Conception of Los Venerables		Bartolomé Esteban Murillo	c. 1678	1852	Jean-de-Dieu Soult	Louvre, Paris	Paris
$0.35 million (£70,000) (~$350,000)	Ansidei Madonna		Raphael	1505–1507	1885	George Spencer-Churchill, 8th Duke of Marlborough	National Gallery, London	Private sale
$0.5 million (~$500,000)	Colonna Altarpiece		Raphael	c. 1503-1505	1901	Charles Sedelmeyer	J. P. Morgan	Private sale
$0.51 million($514,000)	Portrait of Elena Grimaldi Cattaneo		Anthony van Dyck	c. 1623	1906	Knoedler	Peter Arrell Browne Widener	Private sale
$0.51 million($514,000)	The Mill		Rembrandt	1645/48	1911	Henry Petty-Fitzmaurice, 6th Marquess of Lansdowne	Peter Arrell Browne Widener	Private sale
$0.58 million($582,500)	Small Cowper Madonna		Raphael	c. 1504–1505	1913	Joseph Joel Duveen	Peter Arrell Browne Widener	Private sale
$1.57 million	Benois Madonna		Leonardo da Vinci	c. 1478–1480	1914	Benois family	Nicholas II, Emperor of Russia	Private sale
$2 million	Study of a Young Woman		Johannes Vermeer	c. 1665-1667	1959	Prince d'Arenberg	Charles Wrightsman	Private sale
$2.3 million	Aristotle Contemplating a Bust of Homer		Rembrandt	1653	November 15, 1961	Estate of Mrs Alfred Erickson	Metropolitan Museum of Art, New York City	Parke-Bernet, New York
$5-$6 million	Ginevra de' Benci		Leonardo da Vinci	c. 1474–1478	February 1967	Franz Joseph II, Prince of Liechtenstein	National Gallery of Art, Washington, D.C.	Private sale
$5.5 million (£2.3 million)	Portrait of Juan de Pareja		Diego Velázquez	c. 1650	November 27, 1970	Jacob Pleydell-Bouverie, 8th Earl of Radnor	Metropolitan Museum of Art, New York City	Christie's, London
$6.4 million	Juliet and her Nurse		J. M. W. Turner	1836	May 29, 1980	Trustees of Whitney Museum	María Amalia Lacroze de Fortabat	Sotheby Parke Bernet, New York
$10.0 million (£7.47 million)	Seascape: Folkestone		J. M. W. Turner	c. 1845	July 5, 1984	Estate of Kenneth Clark	Unknown	Sotheby's, London
$10.5 million	Adoration of the Magi		Andrea Mantegna	1462	April 18, 1985	Spencer Compton, 7th Marquess of Northampton	J. Paul Getty Museum	Christie's, New York
$39.7 million (£24.75 million)	Vase with Fifteen Sunflowers		Vincent van Gogh	1889	March 30, 1987	Helen Beatty, daughter-in-law of Chester Beatty	Yasuo Goto, Yasuda Comp./Sompo Holdings	Christie's, London
$53.9 million	Irises		Vincent van Gogh	1889	November 11, 1987	John Whitney Payson, son of Joan Whitney Payson	Alan Bond	Sotheby's, New York
$58 million plus exchange of works (Note: The paintings transferred to the dealers include a late Monet entitled Corona (Water Lilies) from around 1920; Renoir's Reclining Nude of 1902; Kandinsky's Autumn Landscape, Murnau from 1908, and Picasso's Striped Bodice from September 1943.)	Portrait of Joseph Roulin		Vincent van Gogh	1889	August 1, 1989	Private collection, Zürich	Museum of Modern Art New York	Private sale via Thomas Ammann, Fine Art Zurich
$82.5 million	Portrait of Dr. Gachet		Vincent van Gogh	1890	May 15, 1990	Siegfried Kramarsky heirs	Ryoei Saito	Christie's, New York
$104.2 million	Garçon à la pipe		Pablo Picasso	1905	May 5, 2004	Greentree Foundation (Whitney family)	Guido Barilla (suspected)	Sotheby's, New York
$135 million	Portrait of Adele Bloch-Bauer I		Gustav Klimt	1907	June 18, 2006	Maria Altmann	Ronald Lauder, Neue Galerie	Private sale via Christie's
$140 million	No. 5, 1948		Jackson Pollock	1948	November 2, 2006	David Geffen	David Martinez	Private sale via Sotheby's
$250 million+ (Note: Exact price (even the currency of sale) is not known, with estimates from $250 million to $300 million)	The Card Players		Paul Cézanne	1892/93	April 2011	George Embiricos	State of Qatar	Private sale
~$300 million	Interchange		Willem de Kooning	1955	September 2015	David Geffen Foundation	Kenneth C. Griffin	Private sale
$450.3 million	Salvator Mundi		Leonardo da Vinci	c. 1500	November 15, 2017	Dmitry Rybolovlev	Badr bin Abdullah Al Saud	Christie's, New York

== See also ==
- Market for artworks
- Destination painting
- The Price of Everything, 2018 documentary on contemporary art valuations
- The Lost Leonardo, 2021 documentary on the 2017 sale of the Salvador Mundi
- List of most expensive artworks by living artists
- List of most expensive books and manuscripts
- List of most expensive cars sold at auction
- List of most expensive non-fungible tokens
- List of most expensive photographs
- List of most expensive sculptures
- List of most expensive watches sold at auction
