= Blaquier (surname) =

Blaquier is a surname. Notable people with the surname include:

- Carlos Pedro Blaquier (1927–2023), Argentine businessman and art collector
- Delfina Blaquier (born 1980), Argentine socialite, photographer, businesswoman, and high jumper
- Nelly Arrieta de Blaquier (died 2020), Argentine sugar heiress, art collector and patron
