= Orchard with Cypresses =

1888 painting by Vincent van Gogh

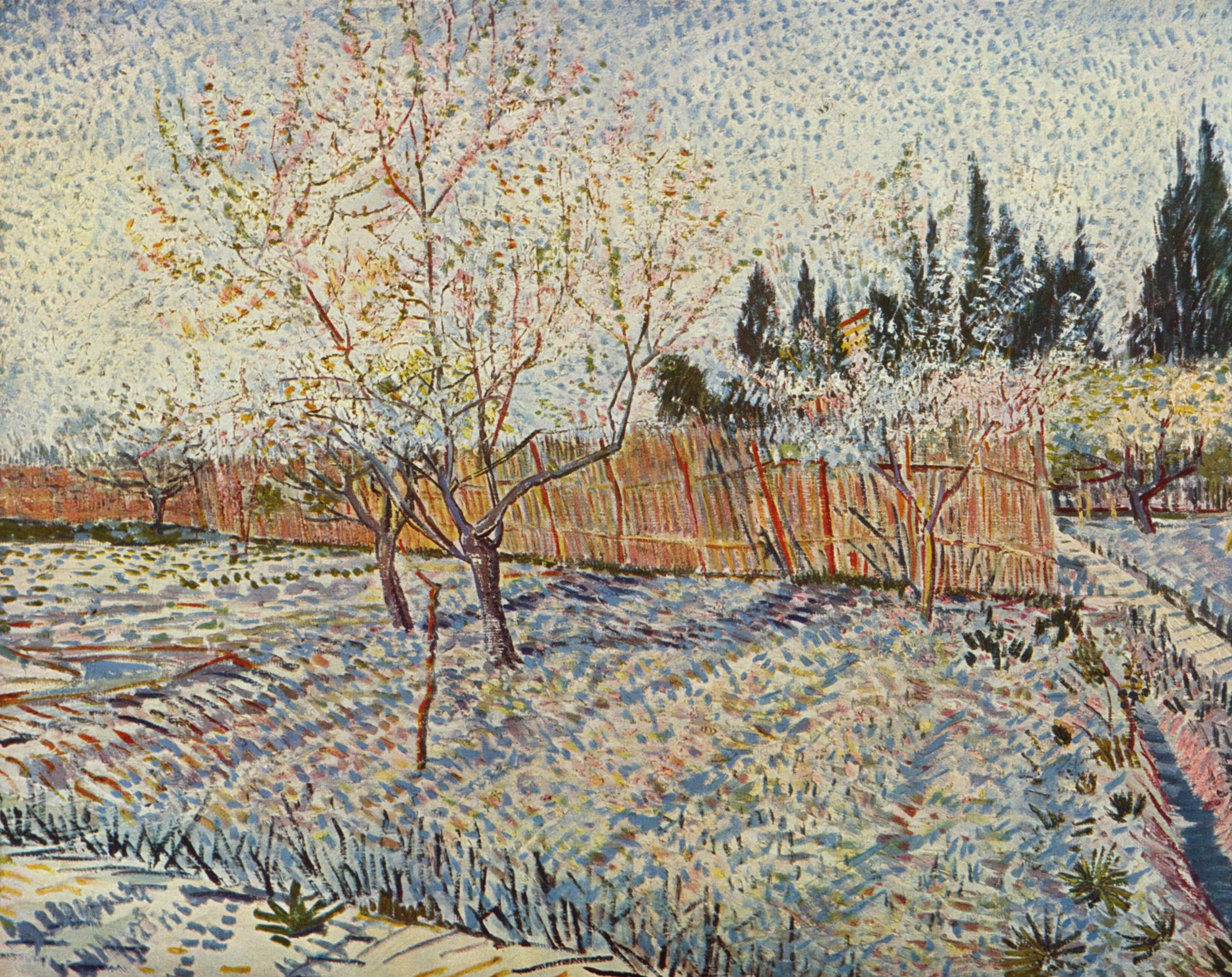
- Artist: Vincent van Gogh
- Year: 1888
- Catalogue: F551; JH1396
- Type: Oil paint on canvas
- Dimensions: 25 3/4 by 31 7/8 inches (650 mm × 810 mm)
- Location: Private collection

Orchard with Cypresses (Verger avec cyprès in French) is an 1888 painting by Dutch artist Vincent van Gogh. The work was in the collection of artworks of Microsoft co-founder Paul Allen, and was sold at auction on 10 November 2022 by Christie's New York branch for $117.2 million dollars, formerly the highest amount paid for a work by van Gogh, surpassed by Blossoming Chestnut Trees in 2026.

== See also ==
- List of most expensive paintings
- List of works by Vincent van Gogh
