= Blossoming Chestnut Trees =

1890 Painting by Vincent van Gogh

Blossoming Chestnut Trees

Blossoming Chestnut Trees or Châtaigniers en fleurs is an 1890 painting by Vincent van Gogh. It was put up for auction at Sotheby's in New York City in November 2026. It was due to be sold as part of a collection of artworks known as the Blaquier-Arrieta Collection. A dispute over the ownership of the painting by the heirs of Samuel Fischer was resolved before its sale. On 18 November 2026, the work sold for US$190.4 million (including fees), setting a record for Van Gogh. Art dealer Bill Acquavella placed the winning bid of US$165 million before fees. At the time, the sale made it the fourth most expensive painting sold at auction.

In their sales description Sotheby's described Van Gogh's work as "With intense, multi-layered brushwork of dabs and dashes he sculpted the voluminosity of the mighty trees. Extraordinary ranges of color exaggerate the natural hues of the pink chestnut blossoms to span from subtle pinks to yellows and orangey pinks, as if setting the trees aflame with complementary color contrasts in variations of greens and oranges, blues and pinks".

== See also ==
- List of most expensive paintings
- List of works by Vincent van Gogh
