= Man in Her Life =

Man in Her Life or Men in Her Life may refer to:

== Film ==
- Men in Her Life (1931 film), a pre-Code U.S. film, based on the 1930 novel
- The Men in Her Life (1941 film), a U.S. film
- The Man in Her Life, a 1997 film by Carlos Siguion-Reyna screened at the 1997 Toronto International Film Festival
- The Man in Her Life (Tagalog: Ang Lalaki sa Buhay ni Selya, lit. 'The Man in Selya's Life'), a 1998 Philippine film

== TV ==
- "Men in Her Life", 1957 season 2 episode 15 of U.S. anthology TV show The 20th Century Fox Hour
- "The Man in Her Life", a 1979 season 3 segment of The Love Boat U.S. TV show

== Literature ==
- The Men in Her Life, a 1930 passionate novel by Samuel Hopkins Adams, the basis of the 1931 film
- The Man in Her Life, a 1935 romance novel by Ruby M. Ayres
- "The Man in Her Life", a 1990 screenplay by Elaine Feinstein

== Other uses ==
- Men in Her Life (painting), a 1962 Andy Warhol painting
