= No 1 (Royal Red and Blue) =

Painting by Mark Rothko

- Artist: Mark Rothko
- Year: 1954
- Medium: Oil on canvas
- Dimensions: 288.9 cm × 171.5 cm (113¾ in × 67½ in)
- Location: Private collection

No 1 (Royal Red and Blue) is a 1954 Color Field painting by the Abstract expressionist artist Mark Rothko. In November 2012, the painting sold for US$75.1 million (£47.2m) at a Sotheby's auction.

== See also ==
- List of most expensive paintings
