= The Card Players =

Painting series by Paul Cézanne

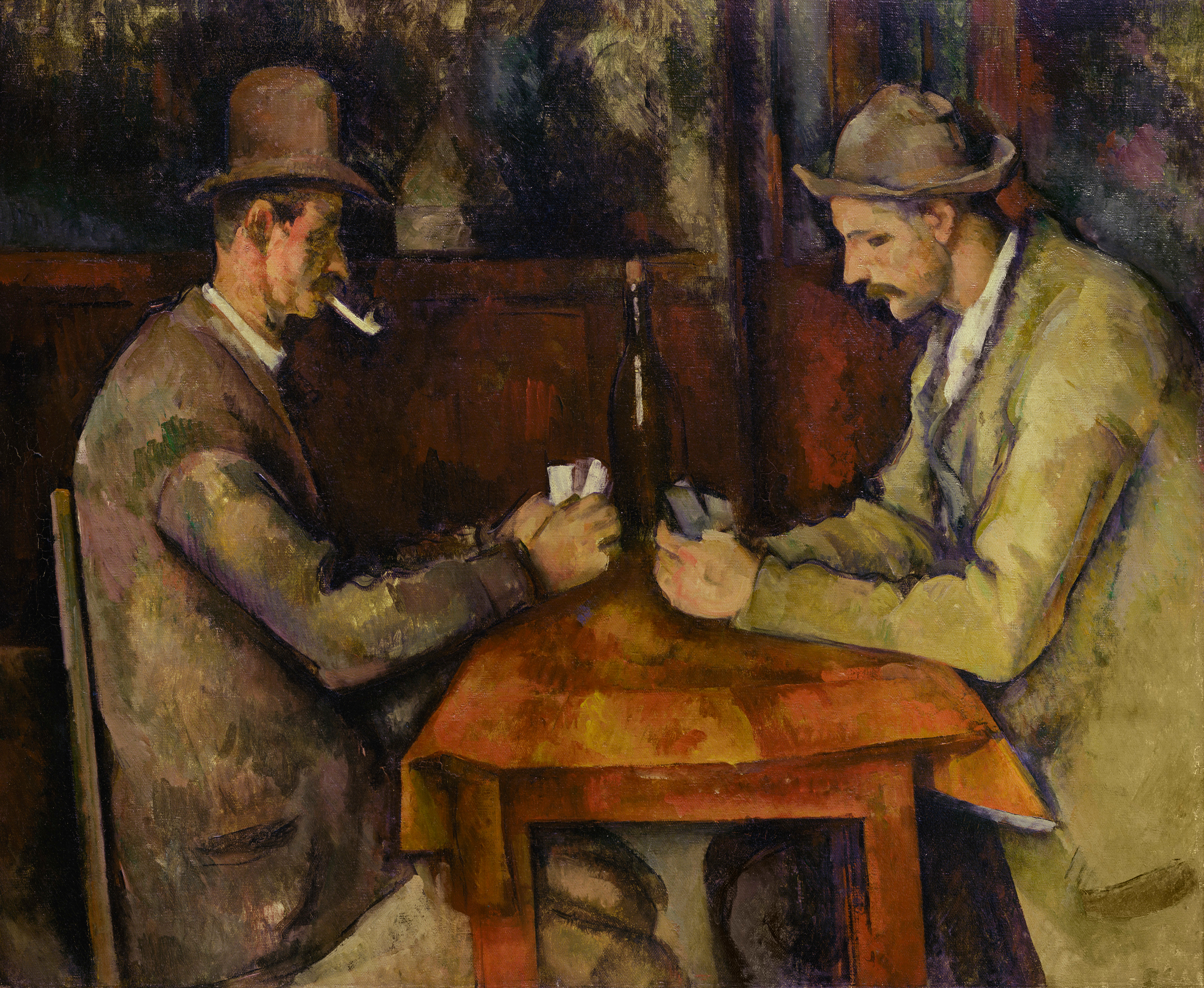
- Artist: Paul Cézanne
- Year: 1894–95
- Medium: Oil on canvas
- Dimensions: 47.5 cm × 57 cm (18.7 in × 22 in)
- Location: Musée d'Orsay, Paris

The Card Players is a series of oil paintings by the French Post-Impressionist artist Paul Cézanne. Painted during Cézanne's final period in the early 1890s, there are five paintings in the series. The versions vary in size, the number of players, and the setting in which the game takes place. Cézanne also completed numerous drawings and studies in preparation for The Card Players series.

One version of The Card Players was sold in 2011 to the Royal Family of Qatar for a price estimated at $250 million ($357.8 million today), signifying a new mark for highest ever price for a painting, not surpassed until November 2017.

== Overview ==
The series is considered by critics to be a cornerstone of Cézanne's art during the early-to-mid 1890s period, as well as a "prelude" to his final years, when he painted some of his most acclaimed work.

Each painting depicts Provençal peasants immersed in their pipes and playing cards. The subjects, all male, are displayed as studious within their card playing, eyes cast downward, intent on the game at hand. Cézanne adapted a motif from 17th-century Dutch and French genre painting which often depicted card games with rowdy, drunken gamblers in taverns, replacing them instead with stone-faced tradesmen in a more simplified setting. Whereas previous paintings of the genre had illustrated heightened moments of drama, Cézanne's portraits have been noted for their lack of drama, narrative, and conventional characterization. Other than an unused wine bottle in the two-player versions, there is an absence of drink and money, which were prominent fixtures of the 17th-century genre. A painting by one of the Le Nain brothers, hung in an Aix-en-Provence museum near the artist's home, depicts card players and is widely cited as an inspiration for the works by Cézanne.

The models for the paintings were local farmhands, some of whom worked on the Cézanne family estate, the Jas de Bouffan. Each scene is depicted as one of quiet, still concentration; the men look down at their cards rather than at each other, with the cards being perhaps their sole means of communication outside of work. One critic described the scenes as "human still life", while another speculated that the men's intense focus on their game mirrors that of the painter's absorption in his art.

== Paintings ==
While there are, in total, five paintings of card players by Cézanne, the final three works were similar in composition and number of players (two), causing them to sometimes be grouped together as one version. The exact dates of the paintings are uncertain, but it is long believed Cézanne began with larger canvases and pared down in size with successive versions, though research in recent years has cast doubt on this assumption.

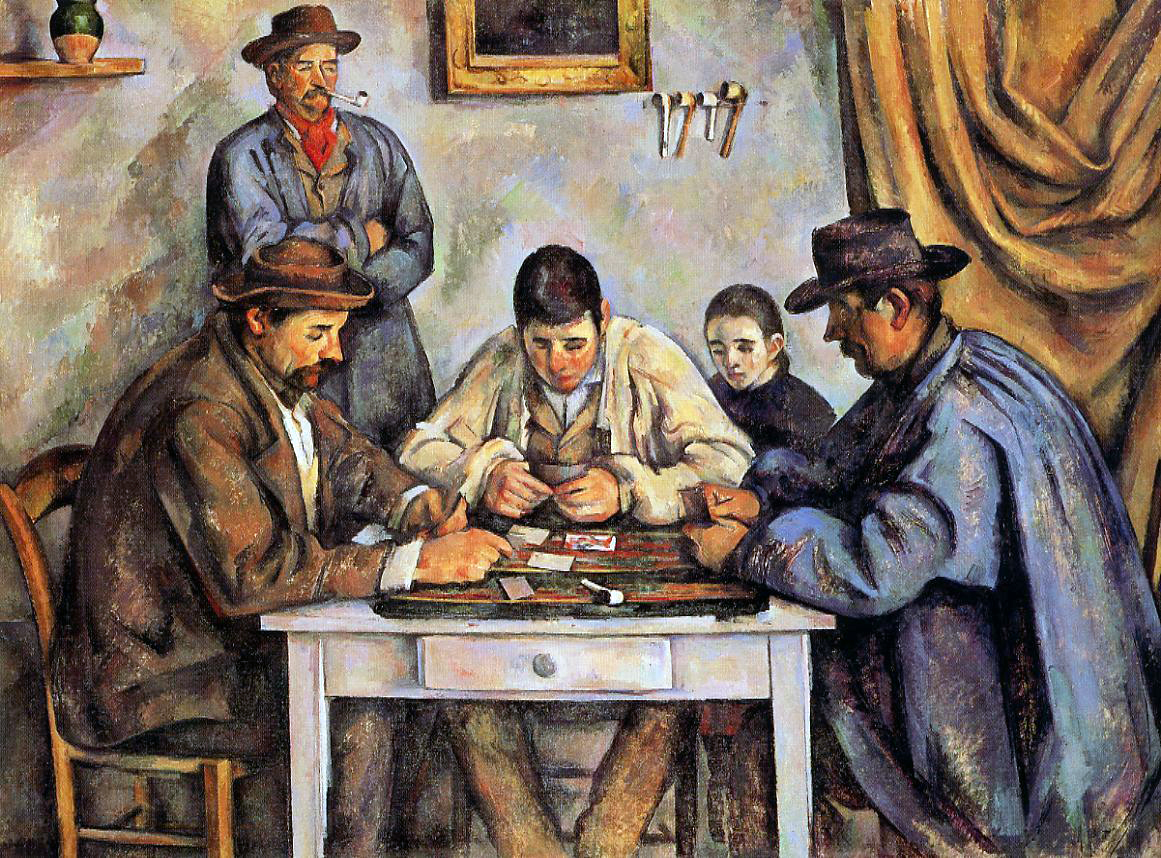
The Card Players, 1890–1892, Barnes Foundation, Philadelphia, Pennsylvania

The largest version, painted between the years 1890–1892, is the most complex, with five figures on a 134.6 x 180.3 cm (53 × 71 in) canvas. It features three card players at the forefront, seated in a semi-circle at a table, with two spectators behind. On the right side of the painting, seated behind the second man and to the right of the third, is a boy, eyes cast downward, also a fixed spectator of the game. Further back, on the left side between the first and second player is a man standing, back to the wall, smoking a pipe and presumably awaiting his turn at the table. It has been speculated Cézanne added the standing man to provide depth to the painting, as well as to draw the eye to the upper portion of the canvas. As with the other versions, it displays a suppressed storytelling of peasant men in loose-fitting garments with natural poses focused entirely on their game. Writer Nicholas Wadley described a "tension in opposites", in which elements such as shifts of color, light and shadow, shape of hat, and crease of cloth create a story of confrontation through opposition. Others have described an "alienation" displayed in the series to be most pronounced in this version. The painting is owned and displayed by the Barnes Foundation museum in Philadelphia, Pennsylvania.

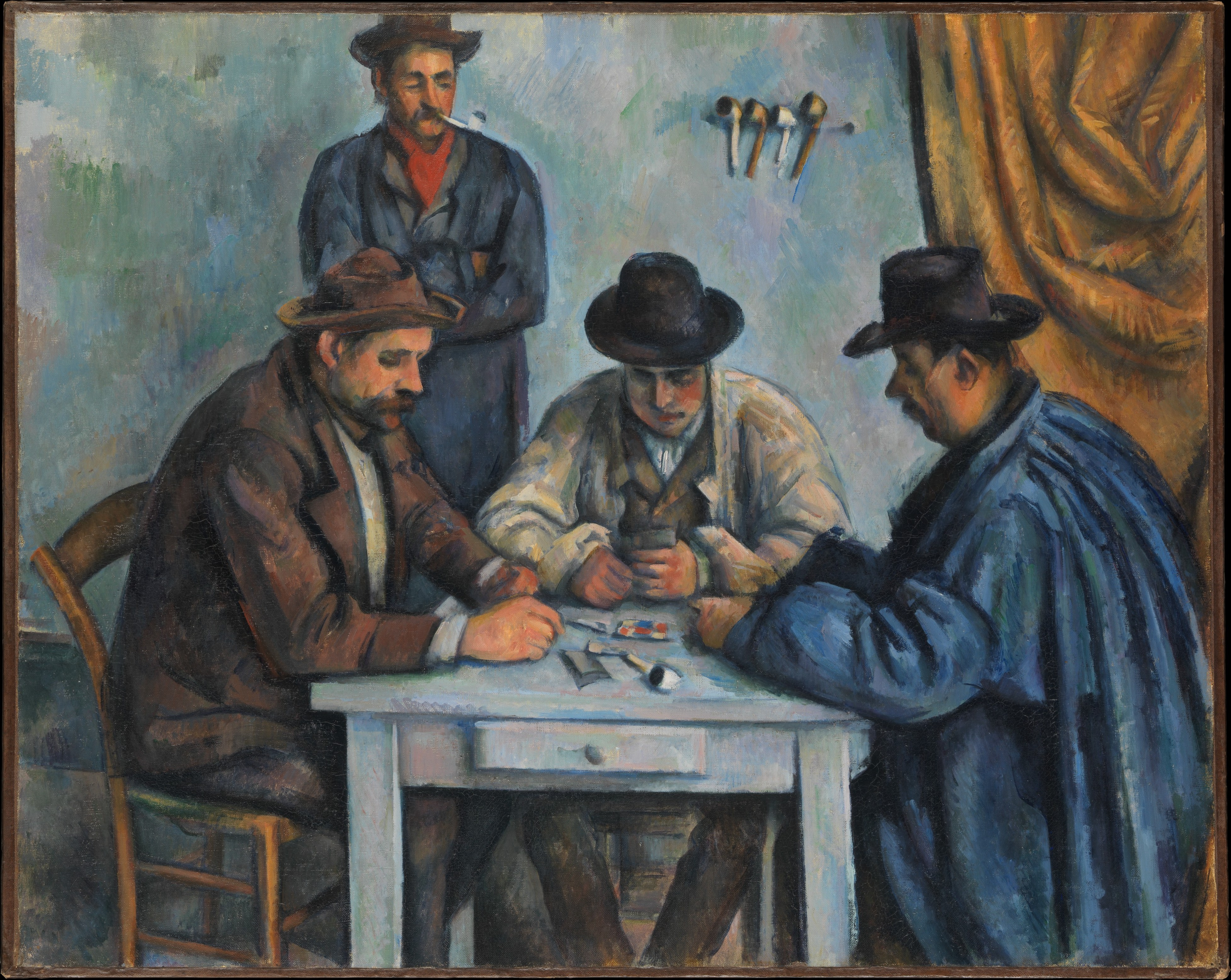
The Card Players, 1890–1892, Metropolitan Museum of Art, New York

A more condensed version of this painting with four figures, long thought to be the second version of The Card Players, is in the Metropolitan Museum of Art in New York. At 65.4 x 81.9 cm (25 3/4 x 32 1/4 in), it is less than half the size of the Barnes painting. Here the composition remains virtually the same, minus the boy, with viewers' perspective slightly closer to the game, but with less space between the figures. In the previous painting, the center player as well as the boy were hatless, whereas this version has all the men hatted. Also gone are the shelf to the left with vase and lower half of a picture frame in the center of the wall, leaving only the four pipes and hanging cloth to join the smoking man behind the card players. The painting is brighter, with less focus on blue tones, than the larger version. X-ray and infrared studies of this version of The Card Players have shown layers of "speculative" graphite underdrawing, as well as heavy layers of worked oil paint, possibly suggesting it was the preliminary of Cézanne's two largest versions of the series, rather than the second version as historically believed. The underdrawing has also led analysts to believe Cézanne had difficulty transferring the men, previously painted individually in studies, onto one canvas.

It has been speculated that Cézanne solved this "spatial conundrum" in the final three versions of The Card Players, by eliminating spectators and other "unnecessary detail" while displaying only the "absolute essentials": two players immersed in their game. The scene has been described as balanced but asymmetrical, as well as naturally symmetrical with the two players being each other's "partner in an agreed opposition". The man on the left is smoking a pipe, wearing a tophat with a downcast brim, in darker, more formal clothing, seated upright; the man to the right is pipeless, in a shorter hat with upcast brim, lighter, more loosely fit clothing, and hunched over the table. Even cards themselves are contrasting light and dark hues. In each of the two-player paintings, a sole wine bottle rests in the mid-part of the table, said to represent a dividing line between the two participants as well as the center of the painting's "symmetrical balance". Of the three versions, perhaps the best known and most often reproduced is in the Musée d'Orsay in Paris. It is also the smallest at 47.5 x 57 cm (17 3/4 x 22 1/2 in). The Orsay painting was described by art historian Meyer Schapiro as "the most monumental and also the most refined" of the versions, with the shapes being simpler but more varied in their relationships. It is the most sparsely painted, and generally considered the last of the Card Players series.

There is a shift of axis to the scene, in which the player to the left is more completely in the picture, chair included, with the appearance of being nearer to us. His partner to the right is cut off from the scene at his back, and the table is displayed at an angle to the plane. Critics have described a "deception of restraint" in Cézanne's use of color; graduated area of thinly applied, "priming" color used for solid forms and their appearance of structure is met with lilac and green used to "liven" the canvas, as well as the bright, deep color used on the lower half for the tablecloth. This version of the series was also part of a high-profile theft of eight Cézanne paintings from a traveling show at Aix in August 1961. The most valuable of the stolen works, The Card Players, was released as a four-color postage stamp by the French government in recognition of the loss. All of the paintings were recovered after a ransom was paid several months later.

The other two-player paintings are in the Courtauld Institute of Art in London and in a private collection. In February 2012, Vanity Fair reported that the royal family of Qatar had, during 2011, purchased their version of the painting for a record price variously estimated at between $250 million and $320 million from the private collection of Greek shipping magnate George Embiricos.

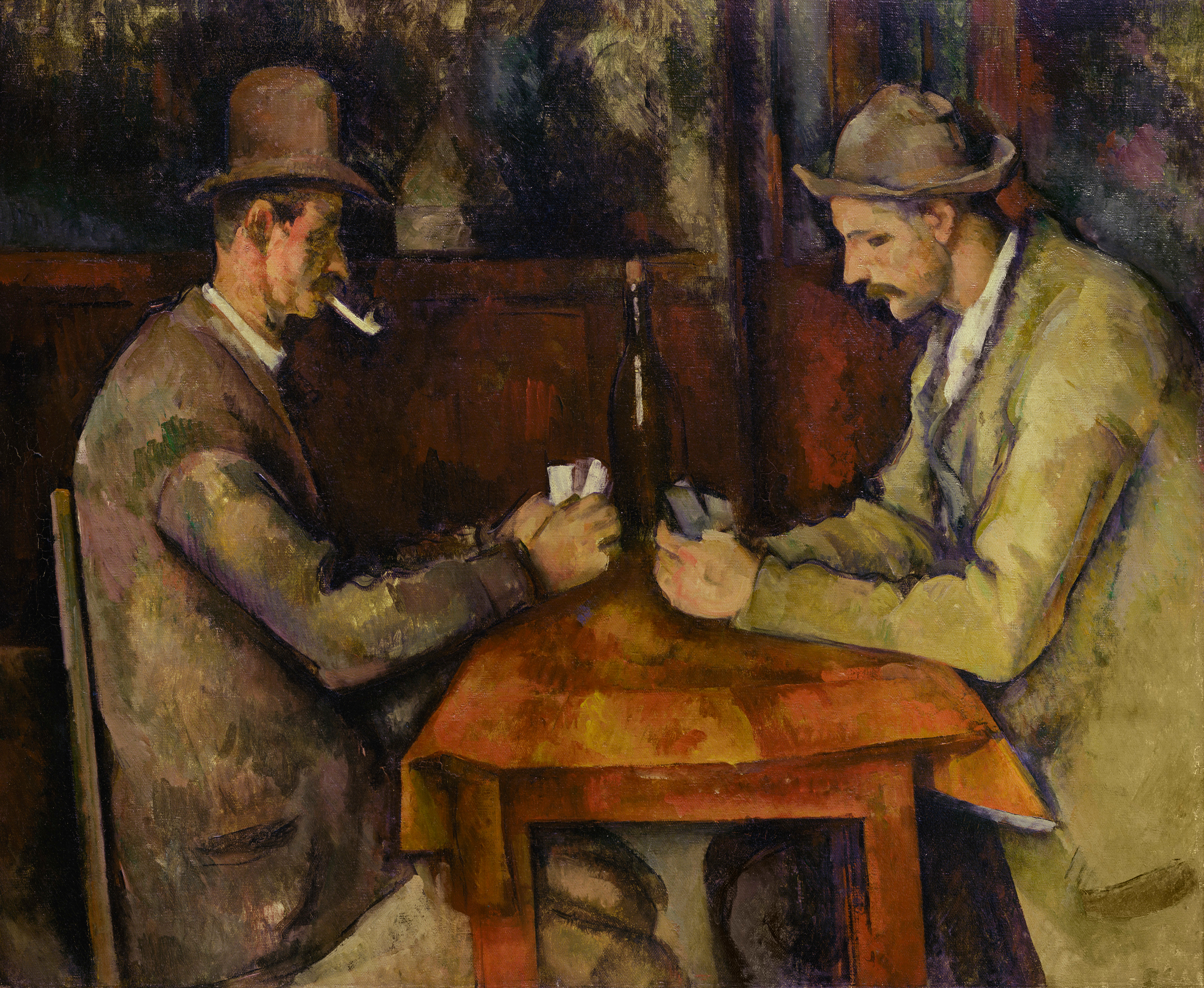
The Card Players 1894–95, Oil on canvas, 47.5 × 57 cm, Musée d'Orsay, Paris

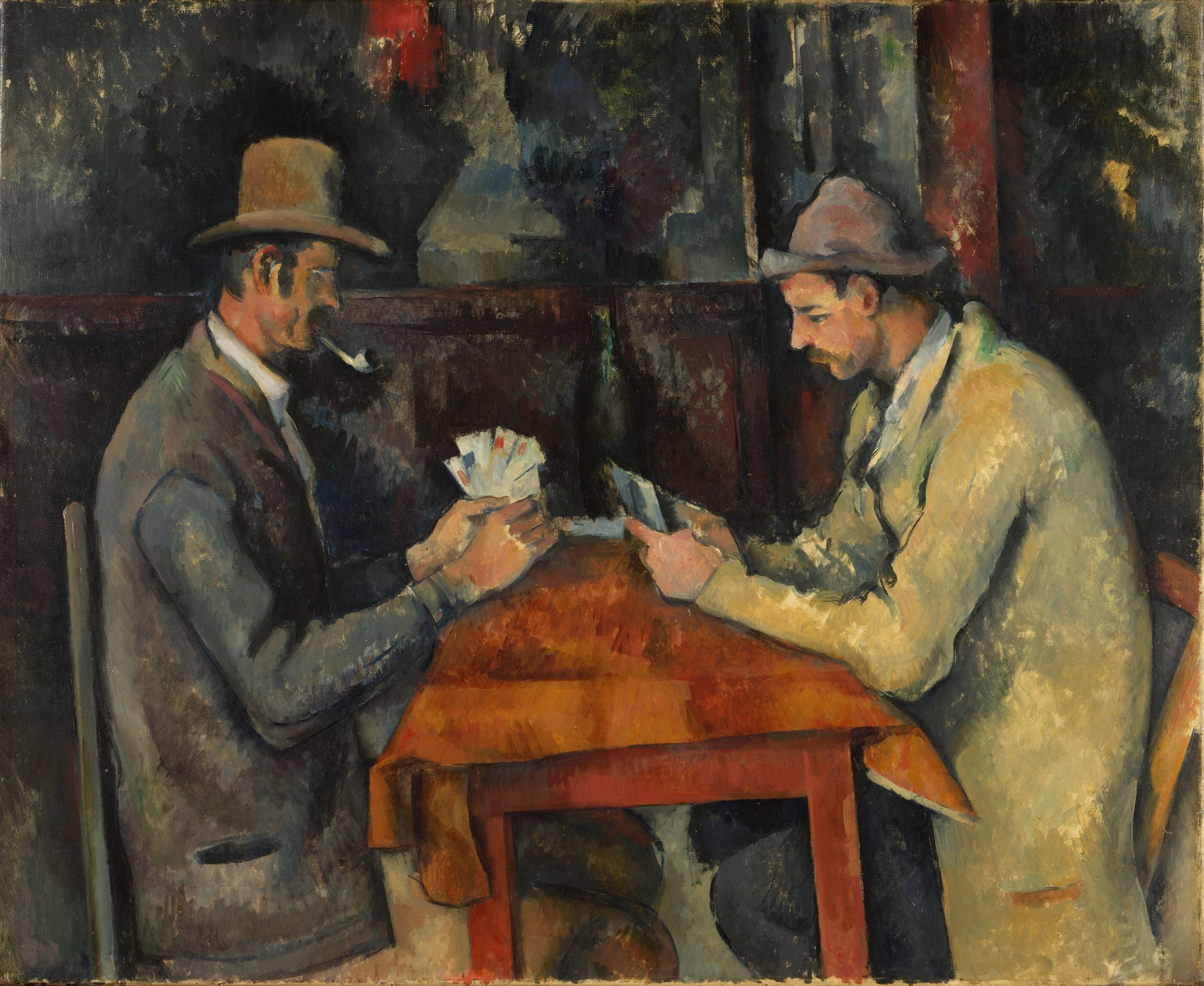
The Card Players 1892–1895, Oil on canvas, 60 x 73 cm, Courtauld Institute of Art, London

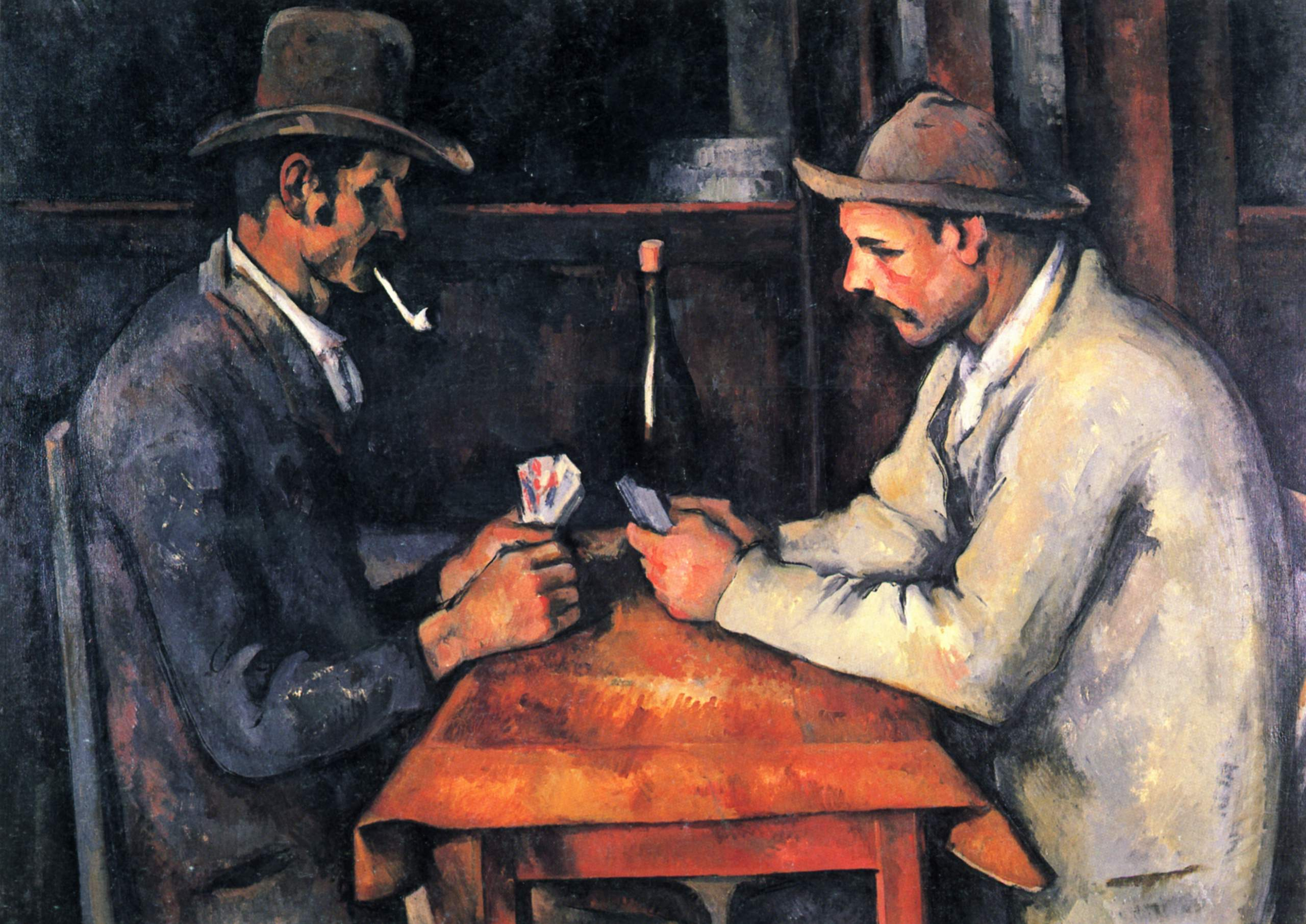
The Card Players 1892–93, Oil on canvas, 97 × 130 cm, Private collection

== Studies and sketches ==
Cézanne created a substantial number of studies and preparatory drawings for The Card Players series. While it had long been believed he began the series with the largest paintings and subsequently worked smaller, 21st-century x-rays of the paintings as well as further analysis of preparatory sketches and studies has led some scholars to believe Cézanne used both the studies and the smaller versions of The Card Players to prepare for the larger canvases.

Over a dozen initial sketches and painted studies of local farmworkers were made by Cézanne in preparation for the final paintings. It has been speculated his models sat for the studies rather than the finished works themselves, and the painter possibly sketched preliminary work in an Aix cafe.

Some of the studies have been well regarded as stand-alone works of their own volition, particularly the accompaniment piece Man with a Pipe, displayed alongside The Card Players at the Courtauld Gallery in London. The former, along with two similar paintings of smokers undertaken in the same period, are considered by many to be some of Cézanne's most masterful portraits.

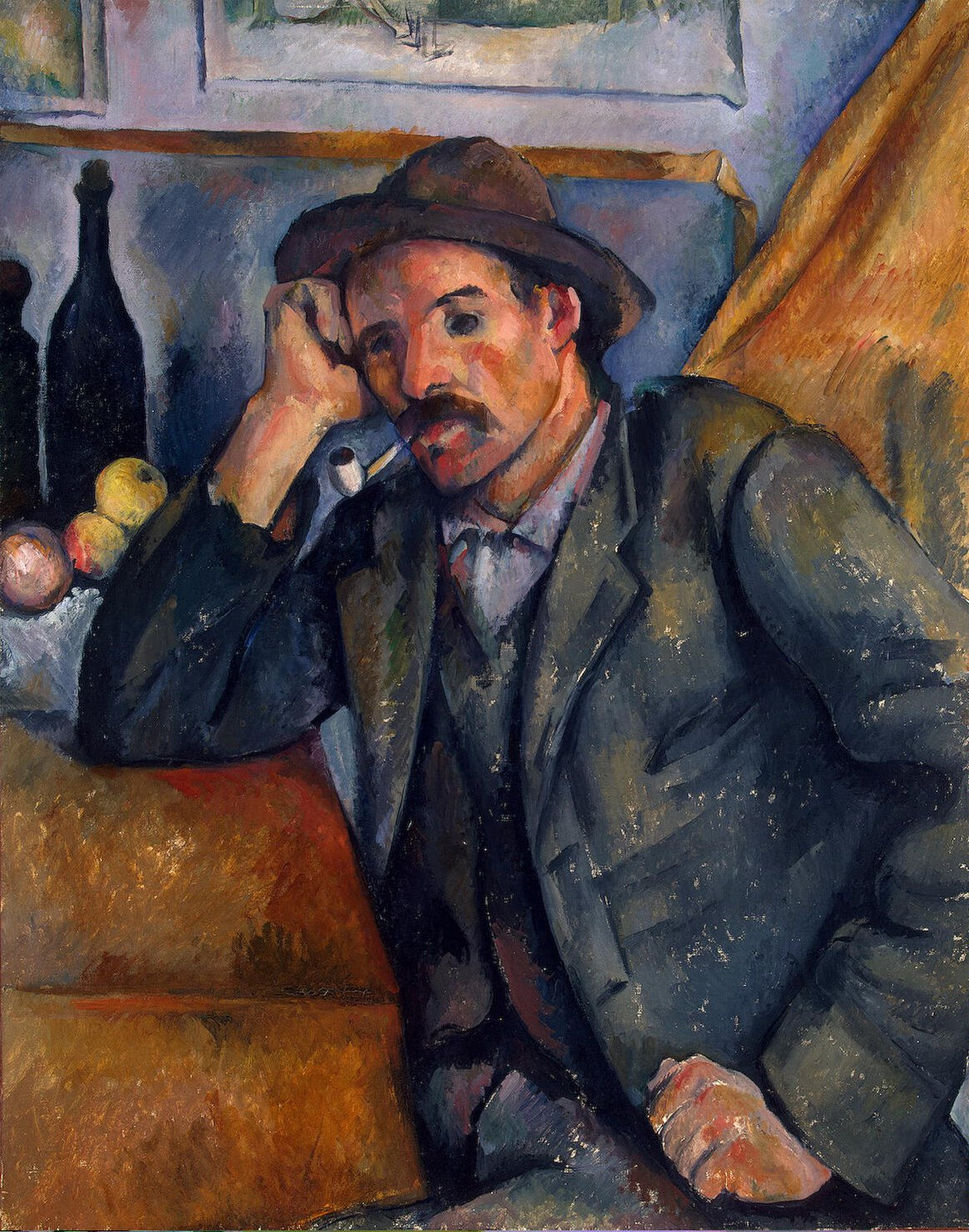
Man with the Pipe c. 1890, Oil on canvas, 90 × 72 cm, Hermitage Museum, St. Petersburg

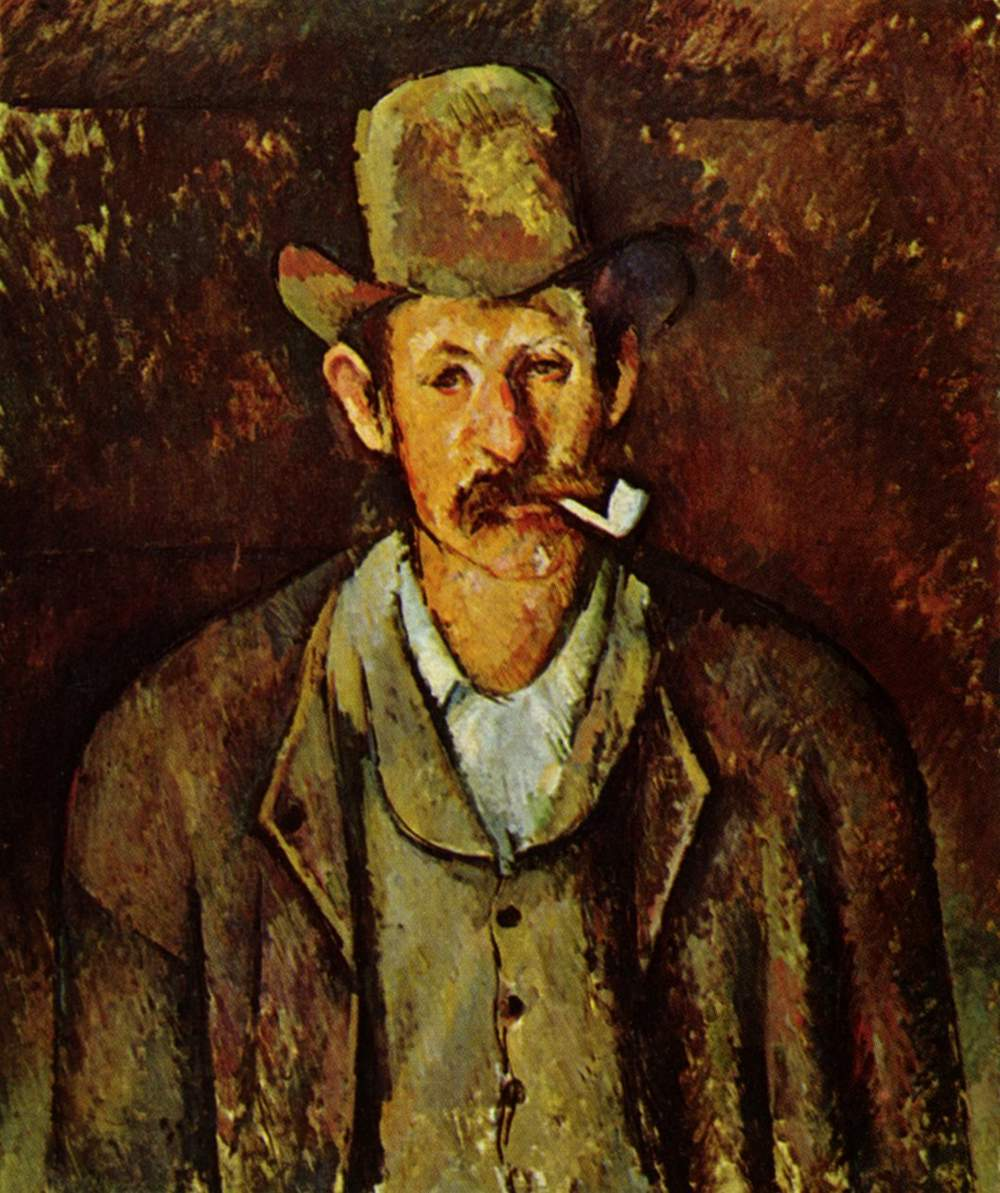
Man with a Pipe c. 1892, Oil on canvas, 73 x 60 cm, Courtauld Institute of Art, London

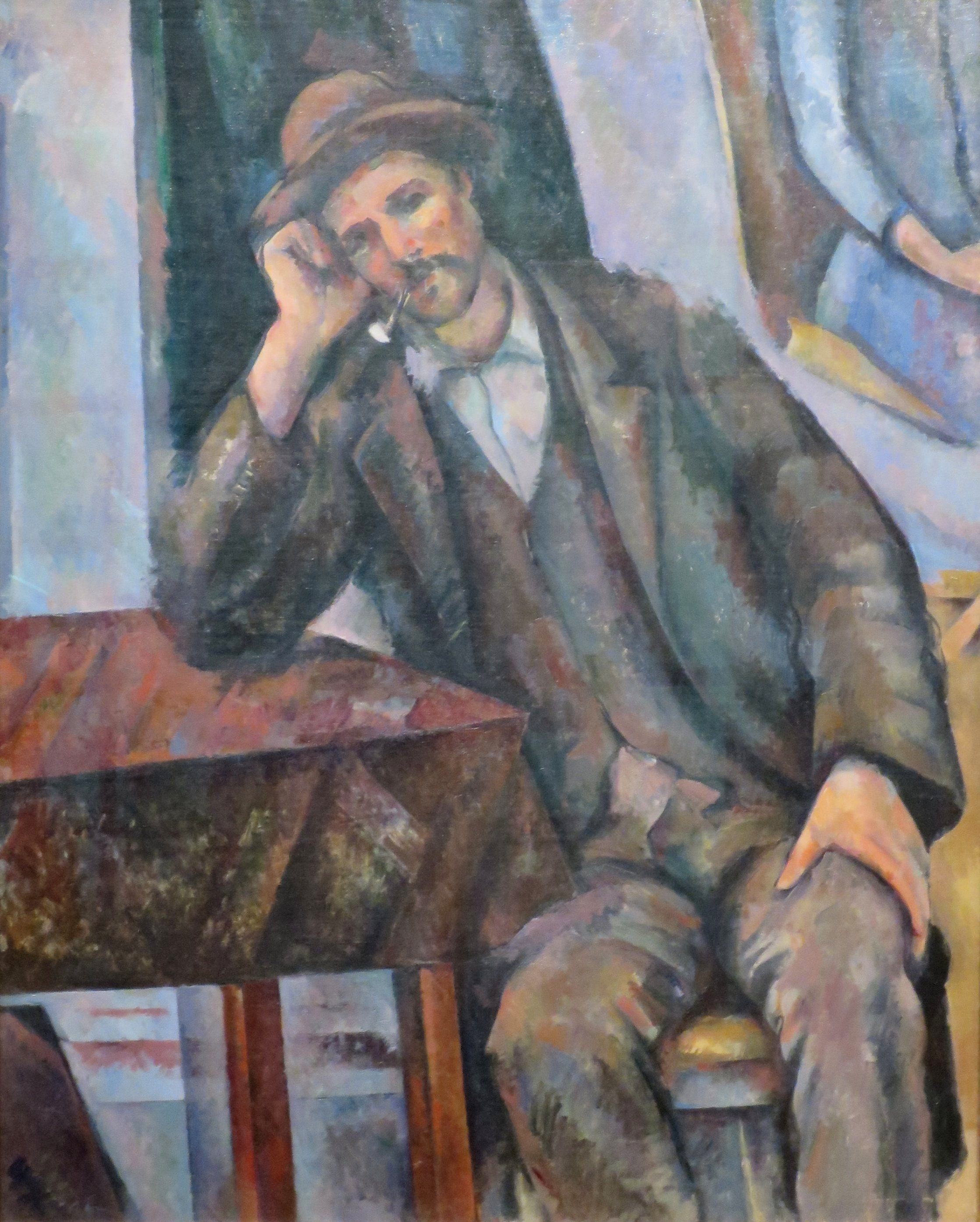
Man Smoking a Pipe 1890–1892, Oil on canvas, 72 x 91 cm, Pushkin Museum, Moscow
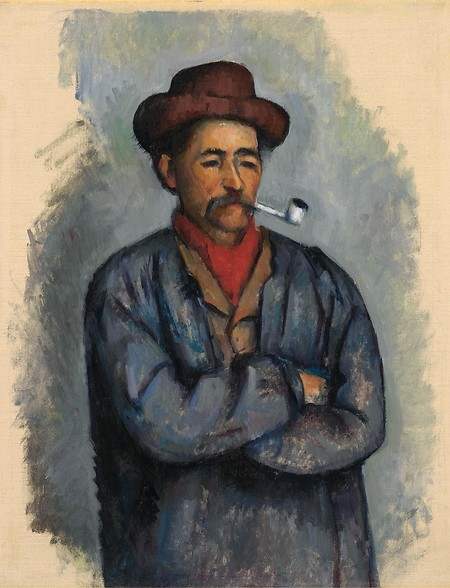
Man with a Pipe (Study for The Card Players) 1890–1892, Oil on canvas, 39 x 30.2 cm, Nelson-Atkins Museum of Art, Kansas City, Missouri

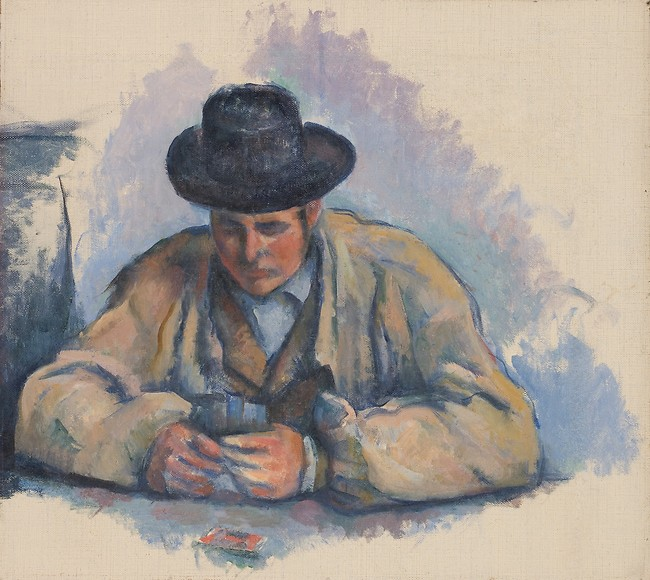
Study for The Card Players 1890–1892, Oil on canvas, 32 x 35 cm, Worcester Art Museum, Worcester, Massachusetts

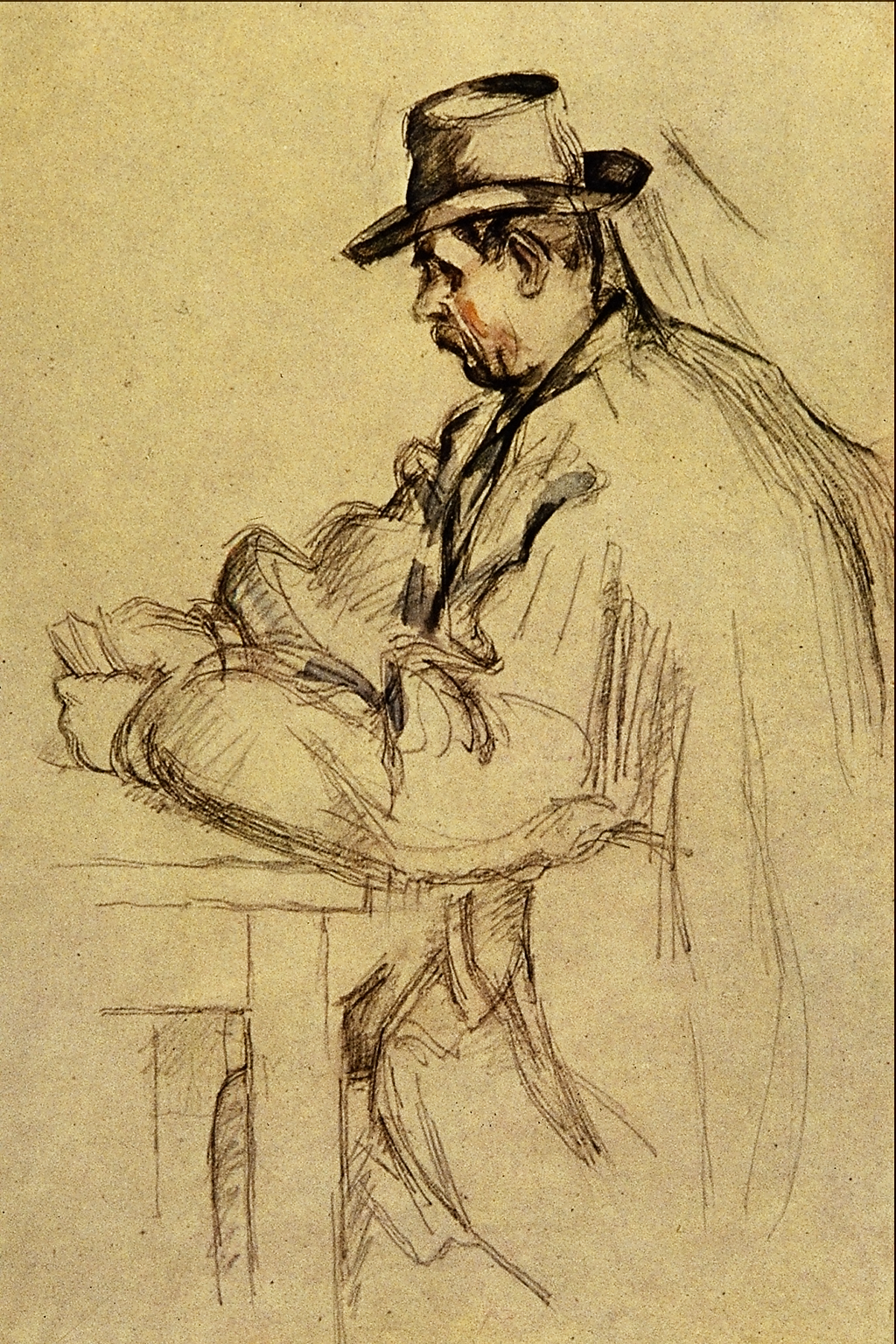
Study for Card Players 1890–1892, Graphite and watercolor on paper, Rhode Island School of Design Museum, Providence, Rhode Island

== Exhibitions ==
In 2010–11, a joint exhibition was curated by the Courtauld Gallery in London and Metropolitan Museum of Art in New York to display The Card Players paintings, early studies and sketches of the series, and accompanying works. The exhibition ran in London from 21 October 2010 to 16 January 2011 and in New York from 9 February 2011 to 8 May 2011.

It was described as the first exhibition devoted to the series as well as the largest collection of Cézanne's Card Players paintings to ever be exhibited together. The exhibition included the paintings owned by the Courtauld, Metropolitan, and Musée d'Orsay. The versions at the Barnes Foundation and in a private collection were displayed as prints, due to the Barnes' policy of not lending and the private collector declining to release the work. The mini-series of men smoking pipes sometimes referred to as The Smokers was also included with over a dozen other studies and sketches, however a legal dispute also prevented the Hermitage Museum's version of Man with a Pipe from traveling to New York.

== See also ==
- List of paintings by Paul Cézanne
- List of most expensive paintings
