= Halit Cıngıllıoglu =

Turkish banker, art collector

Halit Cıngıllıoğlu
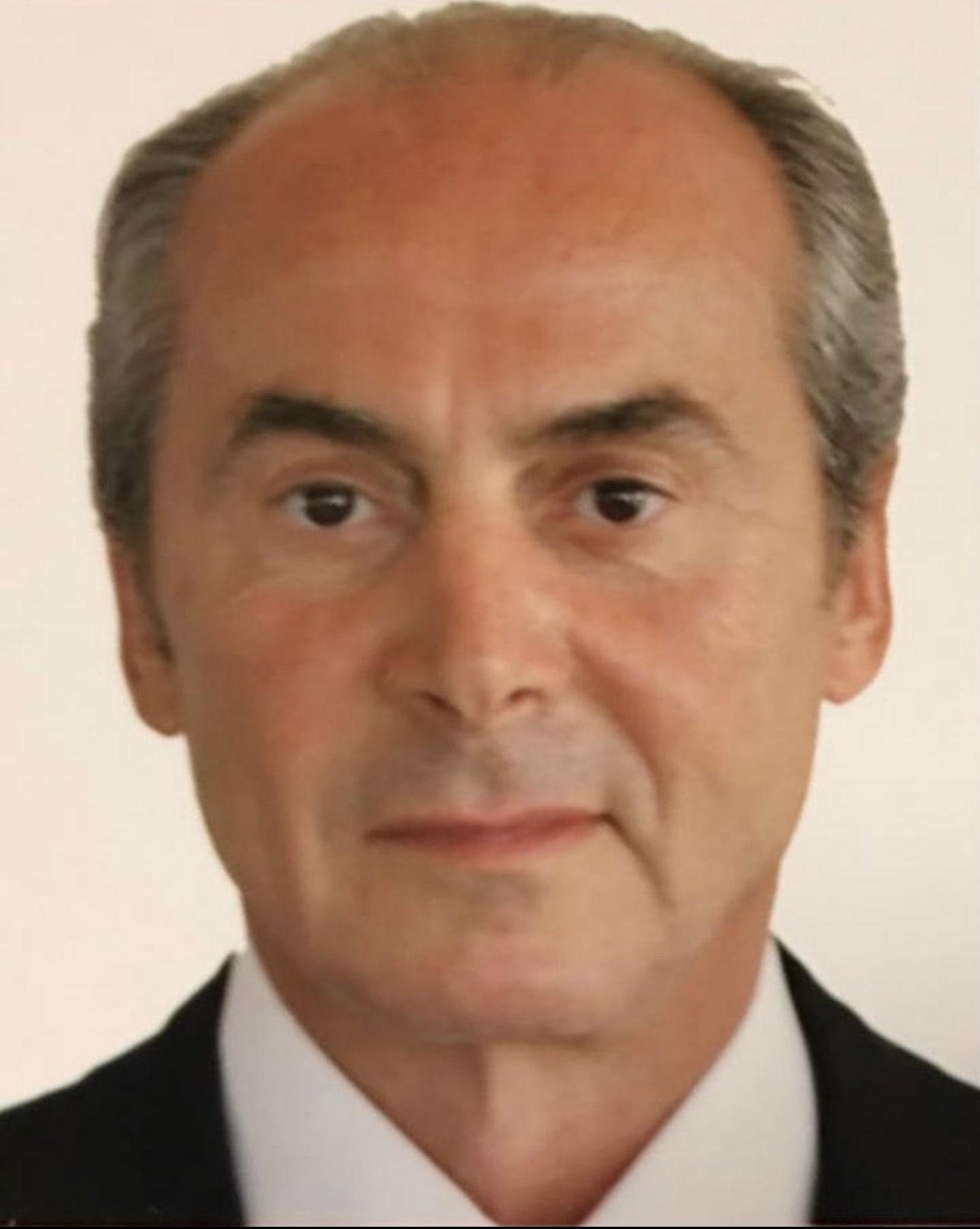
- Dr. Cıngıllıoğlu
- Born: Turkey
- Occupation(s): Banking and finance executive
- Relatives: Kemal Cıngıllıoğlu (son)

Halit Cıngıllıoğlu (born 1954) is a London and Monaco-based industrialist who was born in Turkey.

== Biography ==
His family originates from Kayseri, a central Anatolian town that is well-known for its successful entrepreneurs in industrial and commercial activities, including the Cıngıllıoğlu family, from the early 1900s. They established the first private electricity distribution business in Turkey (which is still owned by the family), and owns companies in various sectors, including energy production, distribution, banking, insurance, leasing, factoring and real estate.

Born into a banking family, Cıngıllıoğlu has been in the finance business throughout his career. In tandem with his director position at HCBG Holding BV, of which he is the sole shareholder, he has been active in the wider financial sector since the early 1970s, occupying various executive and chair positions in several banks, brokerage houses, and leasing, factoring and insurance companies, including his former member position at the Istanbul Stock Exchange. He is also the founder and principal shareholder of C Group, a Turkish conglomerate consisting of banking and financial services companies in the Republic of Turkey, Netherlands, Germany, Belgium, Romania, and Kyrgyz Republic.

He is the principal shareholder of DHB Bank (Nederland) NV in The Netherlands, a bank that Cıngıllıoğlu has an ongoing partnership with the Turkish state; his partner in this bank is with 30% stake Turkiye Halk Bankasi A.S. (Halkbank), the top 6th bank in Turkey in terms of asset size. This bank’s majority owner is the Turkish state while 75.3% of its shares are publicly listed on the Istanbul Stock Exchange. He was chairman of Demirbank, which was seized by the Turkish government in 2001. He retired as chairman of DHB Bank’s Supervisory Board in December 2010.

Cıngıllıoğlu holds PhD and MBA degrees in finance from universities in the USA. He also holds degrees from schools in the Republic of Turkey, France and Switzerland. He has also been awarded with an Honorary Doctorate Degree in finance by the Senate of Erciyes University in Turkey. In addition to his native Turkish language, he also speaks French and English fluently.

Based on his contributions to the society and the development of business environment, Cıngıllıoğlu received a State High Service Medal, a highest level of recognition and respect by the Turkish state and awarded by the President of the Republic of Turkey. He served as the Honorary Consul of The Republic of Turkey in Bruges, Belgium, appointed in January 2005.

== Arts ==
He is also one of the best known names worldwide in the field of art, and has been involved in collecting artwork since his childhood. In 2001, Sotheby's auctioned a group of nine paintings, including works by Monet, Renoir, Cézanne, and Picasso.

According to ARTnews magazine he was among the Top 10 collectors in 2011, and remains among the Top 200 collectors worldwide of impressionist, modern, post-war and contemporary art. An art expert, he is also a member of the International Council of Sotheby's.

== Personal life ==
He is married and has two children.

== See also ==
- List of most expensive painting
