= Te Fare =

1892 painting by Paul Gauguin

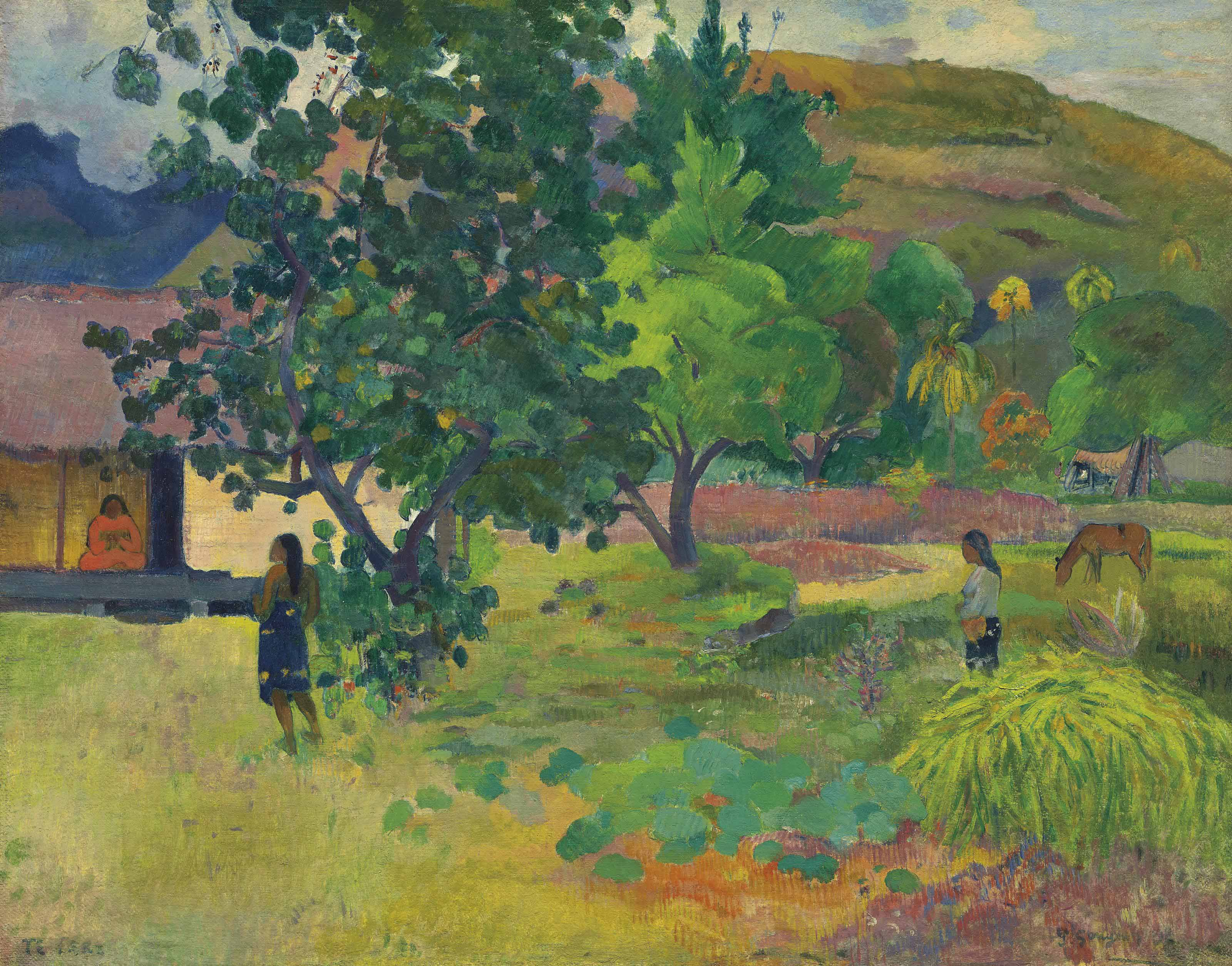
- Artist: Paul Gauguin
- Year: 1892
- Medium: Oil on Canvas
- Location: Private collection

Te Fare (French: La Maison; English: The House) is an 1892 oil on canvas landscape painting by the French Post-Impressionist artist Paul Gauguin.

The work was created during the artist's initial eighteen-month stay on the island of Tahiti during a period of his opus which has been described as "exuberant".

The painting was purchased in a private sale in 2008 by the Russian billionaire oligarch Dmitry Rybolovlev for 54 million euros (then approximately US$85 million). Then in 2017 he sustained a more than sixty-million-dollar loss on his investment when he sold it at auction for US$25 million.

== See also ==
- List of most expensive paintings
- List of paintings by Paul Gauguin
