= La Montagne Sainte-Victoire vue du bosquet du Château Noir =

Painting by Paul Cézanne

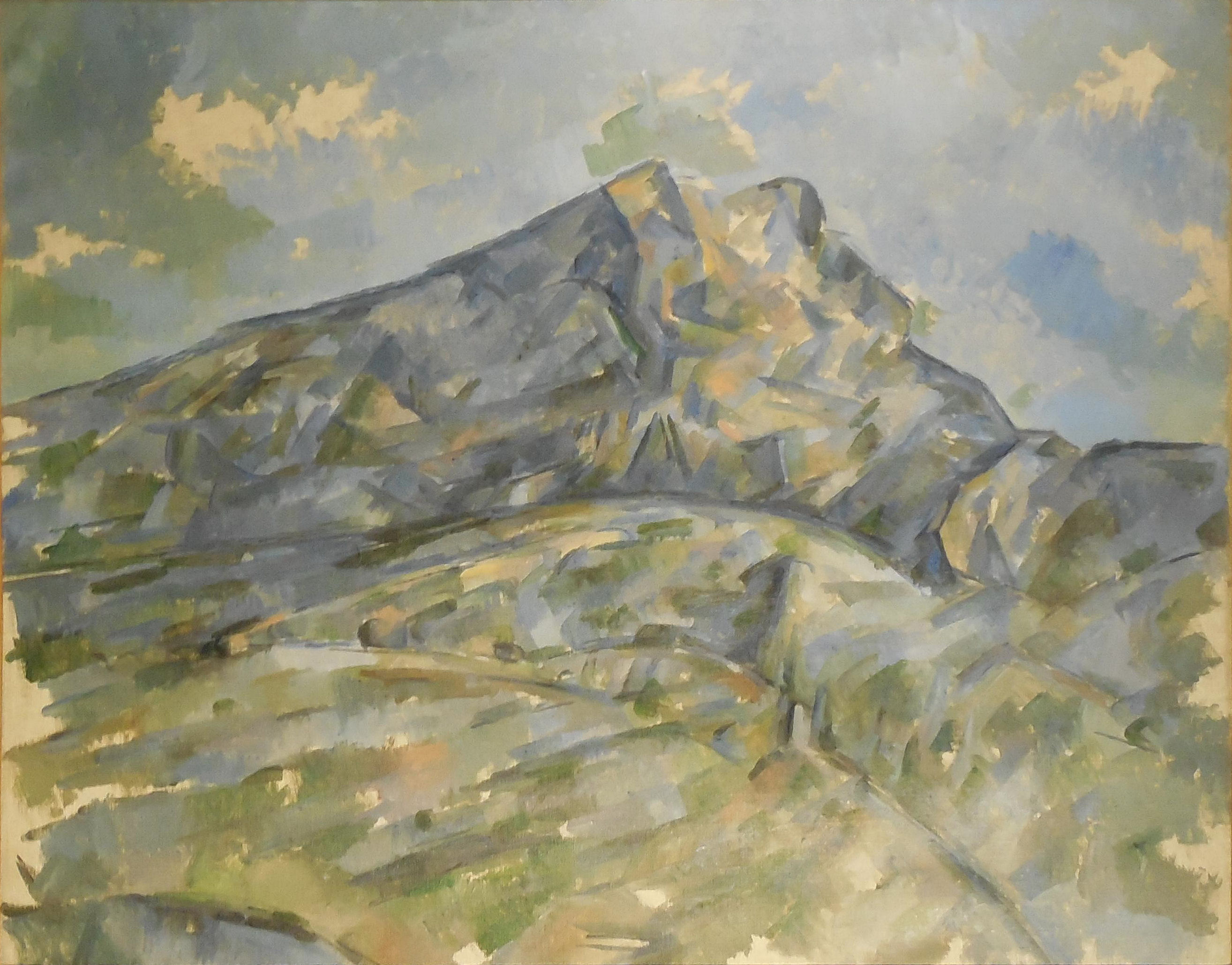
- Artist: Paul Cézanne
- Year: 1904
- Medium: Oil on canvas
- Dimensions: 65 cm × 80.3 cm (26 in × 31.6 in)
- Location: private collection

La Montagne Sainte-Victoire vue du bosquet du Château Noir is an oil on canvas landscape painting by the French artist Paul Cézanne, from 1904.

== History and description ==
The ostensible subject is the painter's familiar Montagne Sainte-Victoire and it is part of a series the artist did of the promontory between 1904 and 1906.

Only half a year after the opening of the Aix–Marseille railway line on 15 October 1877, Cézanne wrote to his friend Émile Zola on 14 April 1878, praising Mont Sainte-Victoire — seen from the train as it crossed the Arc River Valley bridge — as a “beau motif” (“beautiful motif”). Around this time, at the age of thirty-nine, Cézanne began, for the first time, a series of paintings devoted to Mont Sainte-Victoire in his native Aix-en-Provence. It is therefore highly probable that this celebrated series was inspired by the scenery viewed from the window of a moving train.

In 2014 the work was sold by the Edsel and Eleanor Ford House in Grosse Pointe Shores, Michigan for US$100 million in a private sale to the State of Qatar, making it one of the most expensive paintings ever sold.

== See also ==
- List of paintings by Paul Cézanne
- List of most expensive paintings
