= Untitled (Rothko) =

Painting by Mark Rothko

- Artist: Mark Rothko
- Year: 1952
- Medium: Oil on canvas
- Dimensions: 261.6 cm × 158.7 cm (103.0 in × 62.5 in)
- Location: Private collection

Untitled is a 1952 painting by the American abstract expressionist artist Mark Rothko. Similar to Rothko's other works from this period, it consists of large expanses of colour with dark shades.

In 2014, Untitled was bought for $66 million by an anonymous buyer.

== See also ==
- List of most expensive paintings

== Sources ==
- Baal-Teshuva, Jacob. Rothko. Berlin: Taschen, 2003. ISBN 3-8228-1820-8
- Mark Rothko; David Anfam (1998). Mark Rothko: The Works on Canvas : Catalogue Raisonné. Yale University Press. pp. 452–. ISBN 978-0-300-07489-5.
