= Otahi =

1893 painting by Paul Gauguin

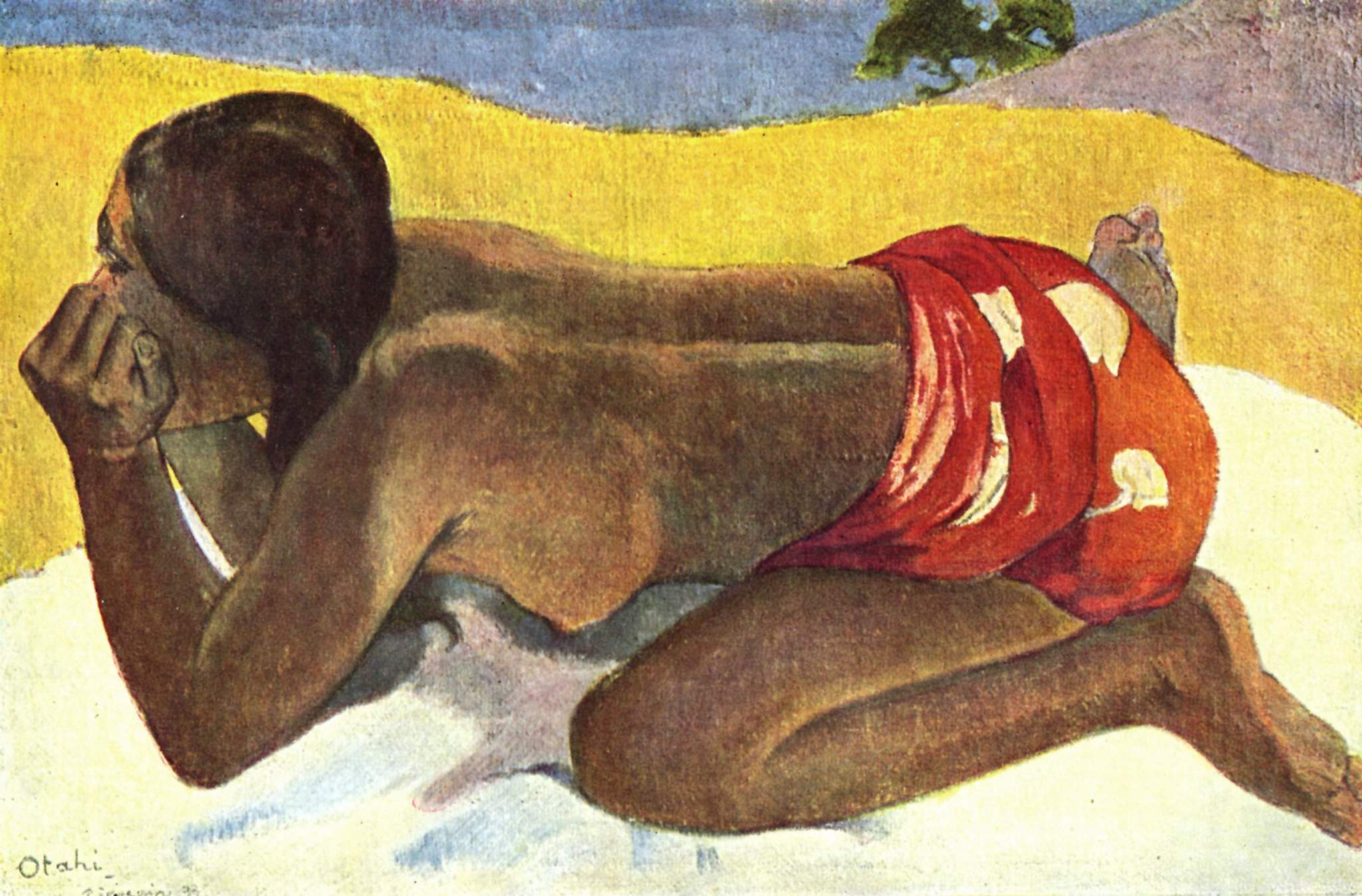
- Artist: Paul Gauguin
- Year: 1893
- Medium: Oil on Canvas
- Dimensions: 50 cm × 73 cm (20 in × 29 in)
- Location: Los Angeles County Museum of Art

Otahi (French: Seule - English: Alone) is an 1893 oil on canvas painting by the Post-Impressionist artist Paul Gauguin.

Painted in Tahiti, the pose the subject takes is considered one to have been taboo as it is one where the woman makes herself ready for sexual penetration. The woman wears a pareo around her loin.

The work was part of a lawsuit between Russian billionaire Dmitry Rybolovlev, Swiss art dealer Yves Bouvier, and the auction house Sotheby's, with the former accusing the two latter parties of inflating prices. Otahi, which was purchased by Rybolovlev for a reputed sum of $120 million US, only resold for some odd $50 million US, resulting in a considerable loss.

In 2025, the painting was given to the Los Angeles County Museum of Art by the estate of Jerry Perenchio.

== See also ==
- List of most expensive paintings
