= Destination painting =

Painting that inspires cultural tourism

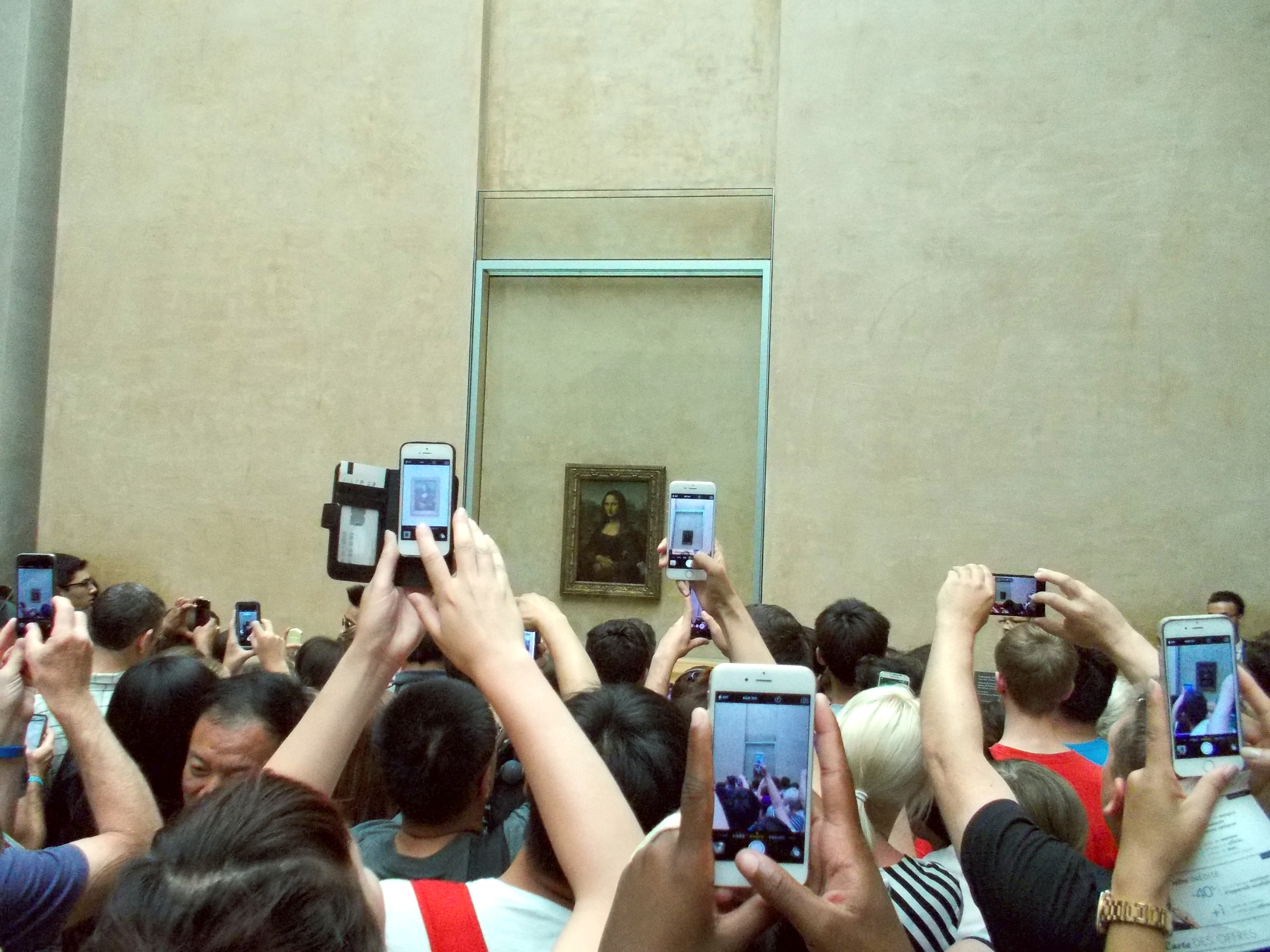
A crowd at the Mona Lisa in the Louvre in Paris

A destination painting or bucket list painting is a painting that in itself may inspire cultural tourism to a museum or other destination. Often such a work would be considered a "masterpiece". A more general characterization would be destination art.

== Role in museums ==
Collections may adopt a policy to keep a destination painting permanently on location, where visitors can expect to see it, by preventing any loan to a travelling exhibition. They may also compete to acquire a potential destination painting during an art auction.

Such paintings can lead to overtourism in parts of a museum where the work is displayed, leading to challenges in exhibit design. This overcrowding can be exacerbated by modern social media photography. The tendency toward a crowded quick experience for major works has had a reaction in the more contemplative "slow art" movement.

== See also ==
- List of most expensive paintings
- List of most-visited art museums
- Starchitect
