= Nude Sitting on a Divan =

Painting by Amedeo Modigliani

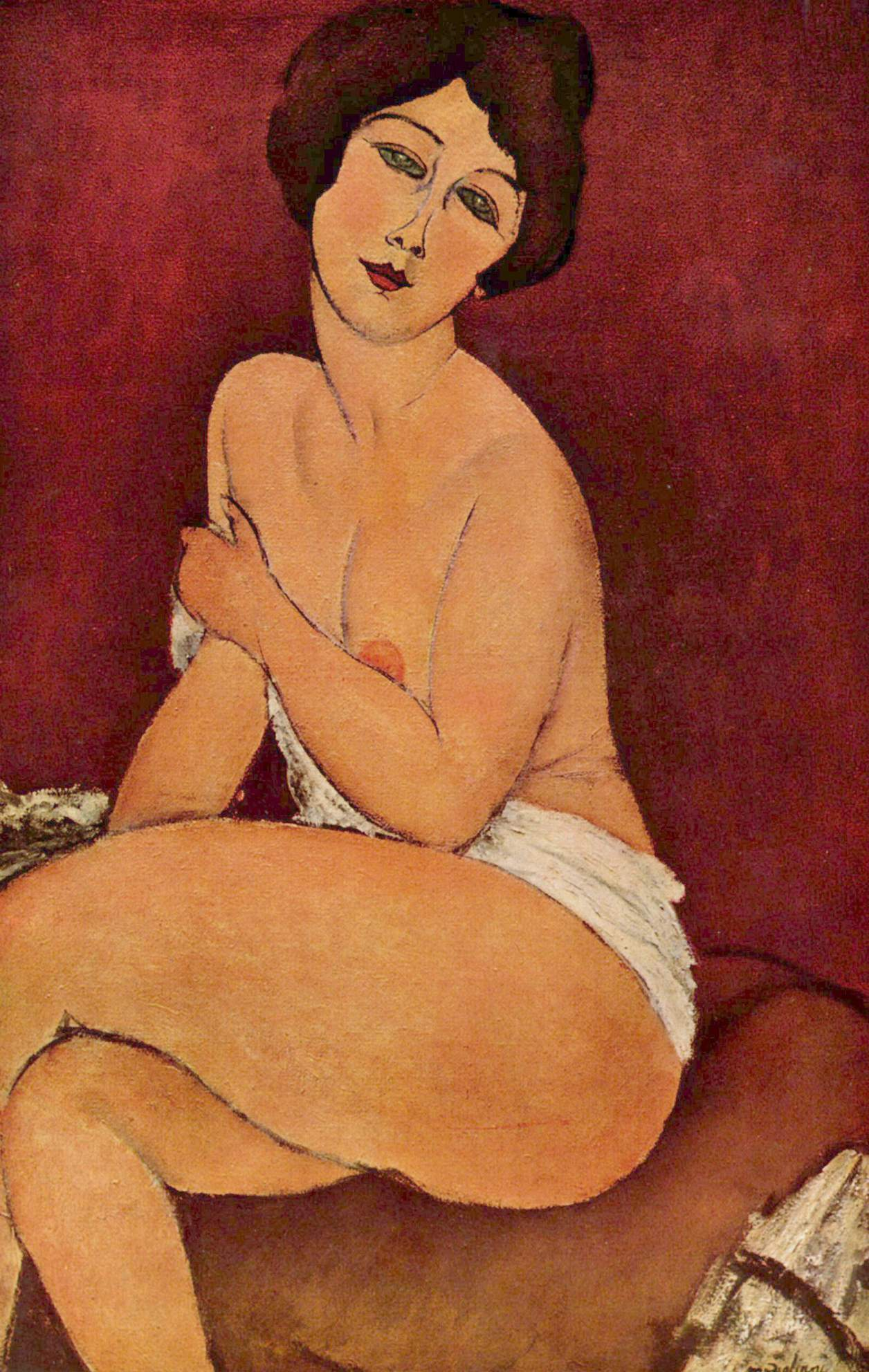
- Artist: Amedeo Modigliani
- Year: 1917
- Medium: Oil on canvas
- Movement: Expressionism
- Dimensions: 100 cm × 60 cm (39.4 in × 25.6 in)
- Owner: Private collection

Nude Sitting on a Divan (The Beautiful Roman Woman) is an oil on canvas painting by Italian artist Amedeo Modigliani depicting a partially draped woman seated with crossed legs against a warm red background. The work was one of a series of nudes painted by Modigliani in 1917 that created a sensation when exhibited in Paris that year. On November 2, 2010, the painting sold at a New York auction for $68.9 million, a record price for an artwork by Modigliani.

The several dozen nudes Modigliani painted between 1916 and 1919 constitute many of his best-known works. Simultaneously abstracted and erotically detailed, they exhibit a formal grace referencing nude figures of the Italian Renaissance while at the same time objectifying their subjects' sexuality; they "exemplify his position between tradition and modernism". The nudes of this period are "displayed boldly, with only the faintest suggestion of setting.... neither demure nor provocative, they are depicted with a degree of objectivity. Yet the uniformly thick, rough application of paint— as if applied by a sculptor's hand— is more concerned with mass and the visceral perception of the female body than with titillation and the re-creation of translucent, tactile flesh".

This series of nudes was commissioned by Modigliani's dealer and friend Leopold Zborowski, who lent the artist use of his apartment, supplied models and painting materials, and paid him between fifteen and twenty francs each day for his work. The paintings from this arrangement were thus different from his previous depictions of friends and lovers in that they were funded by Zborowski either for his own collection, as a favor to his friend, or with an eye to their "commercial potential", rather than originating from the artist's personal circle of acquaintances.

The Paris show of 1917 was Modigliani's only solo exhibition during his life, and is "notorious" in modern art history for its sensational public reception and the attendant issues of obscenity. The show was closed by police on its opening day, but continued thereafter, most likely after the removal of paintings from the gallery's streetfront window.

According to the catalogue description from the 2010 sale at Sotheby's, seven nudes were exhibited in the 1917 show, four of them titled Nu; "the present work may have been among these pictures.... the models' permissiveness and the artist's accessibility to them implied that these oils were post coital-renderings, the women still flush and basking in the afterglow".

In 1999 Nude Sitting on a Divan sold at Sotheby's for $16.7 million, a record price for a painting by the artist. The most recent sale far surpassed the pre-sale estimate of $40 million, as well as the previous record for one of Modigliani's works, $52.6 million for a sculpture.

== See also ==
- List of most expensive paintings
