= George Embiricos =

Greek businessman (1920–2011)

- Born: George Embiricos; 1920; Andros
- Died: 2011 (aged 90–91)
- Education: University of Athens
- Occupations: Art collector, shipping magnate

George Embiricos (Greek: Γεώργιος Α. Εμπειρίκος, Georgios A. Empeirikos; 1920–2011) was a Greek shipping magnate, and art collector, who owned several masterpieces by El Greco, Goya, Cézanne, Kandinsky, Picasso, van Gogh and Bacon, in his home in Lausanne, Switzerland.

== Early and professional life ==
Embiricos attended Cambridge prior to the outbreak of World War II and subsequently obtained a law degree from the University of Athens. He then joined the family shipping business in London. In the late 1940s he moved to New York with his wife and set up his own shipping office. He started collecting art in New York while continuing his career for many years in the shipping business. One of his innovations in shipping was conceiving the modern bulk carrier in 1954. While in New York he had two sons, Aristides and Peter.

== Personal life ==
Embiricos's estate included the superyacht, Astarte II, and many other famous artworks. Notably, he sold the Paul Cézanne painting, The Card Players, for somewhere between $259 and $320 million reportedly to the Royal Family of Qatar in 2011. It was the most expensive painting sold up to that time.
