= Peasant Woman Against a Background of Wheat =

Painting by Vincent van Gogh

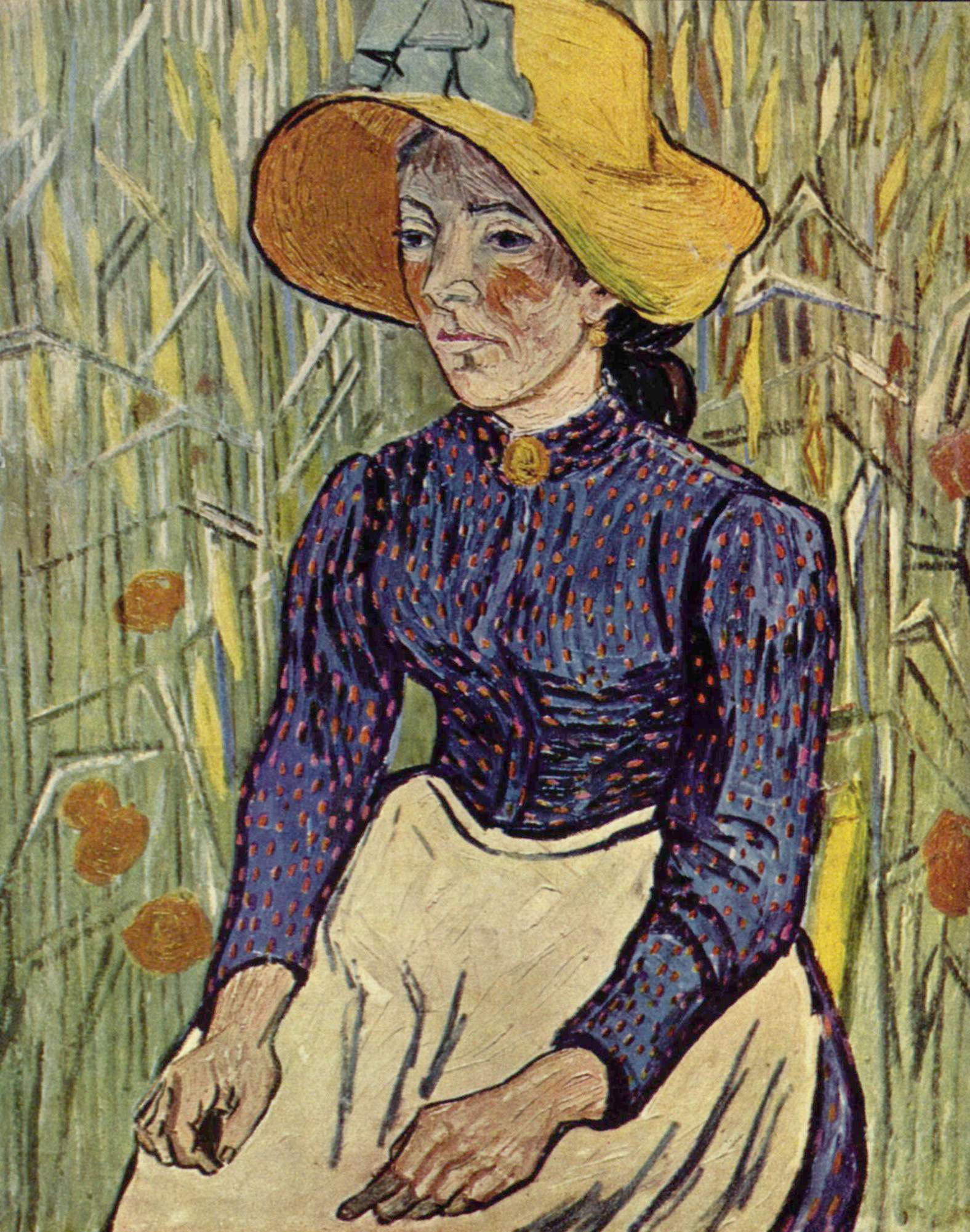
- Artist: Vincent van Gogh
- Year: June 1890
- Catalogue: F774; JH2043
- Medium: Oil on canvas
- Dimensions: 92 cm × 73 cm (36 in × 29 in)
- Owner: Private collection

Peasant Woman Against a Background of Wheat is an 1890 oil on canvas painting by Vincent van Gogh. Van Gogh went on to paint several versions of this painting.

The painting has changed hands several times. In 1997, Stephen Wynn paid $47.5 million for the painting.

On October 7, 2005, it was announced that Stephen Wynn had sold the painting along with Paul Gauguin's Bathers to Steven A. Cohen for more than $100 million.

== See also ==
- List of works by Vincent van Gogh
- List of most expensive paintings
