= No. 10 (Rothko) =

1958 painting by Mark Rothko

- Artist: Mark Rothko
- Year: 1958
- Medium: Oil on canvas
- Dimensions: 239.4 cm × 175.9 cm (94.3 in × 69.3 in)
- Location: Private collection

No. 10 is a 1958 painting by the Jewish-American Abstract expressionist artist Mark Rothko. It was painted in 1958.

In common with Rothko's other works from this period, No 10 consists of expanses of colour with dark shades.

In 2015 No. 10 was bought for $82 million by an anonymous buyer, at Christie's.

== See also ==
- List of most expensive paintings

== Sources ==
- Baal-Teshuva, Jacob. Rothko. Berlin: Taschen, 2003. ISBN 3-8228-1820-8
- Rothko, Mark; Anfam, David (1998). Mark Rothko: The Works on Canvas : Catalogue Raisonné. Yale University Press. pp. 452–. ISBN 978-0-300-07489-5.
