= Seascape: Folkestone =

Painting by J. M. W. Turner

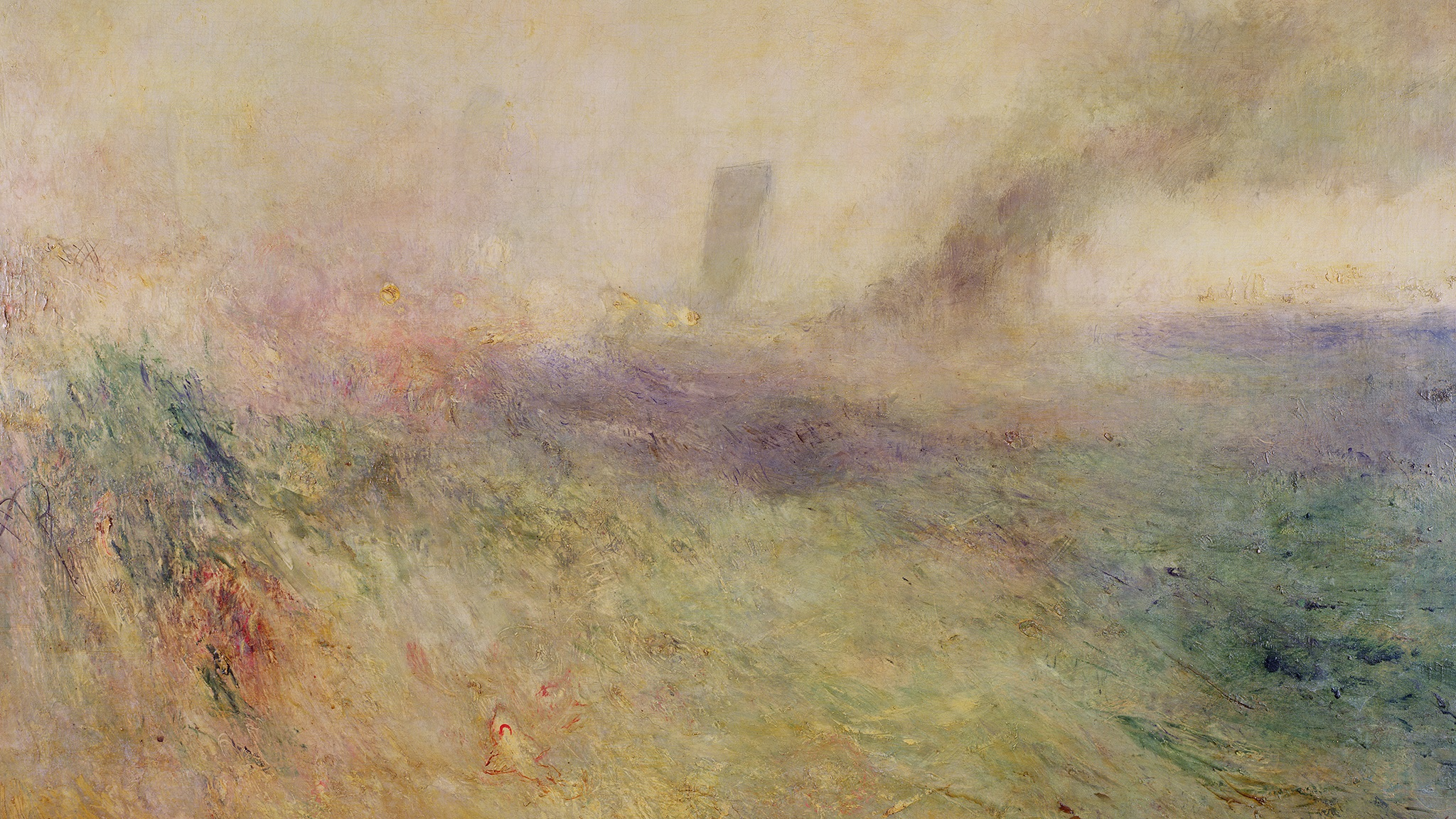
- Artist: J. M. W. Turner
- Year: c. 1845
- Medium: Oil painting
- Dimensions: 86 cm × 120 cm (34 in × 46 in)
- Location: Private collection

Seascape: Folkestone is an oil painting created by Joseph Mallord William Turner. It dates to around 1845, when Turner made a return visit to Folkestone. The painting depicts a swirling seascape featuring the shoreline and cliffs of Folkestone with two boats heading out to sea, one a sailboat and the other with a funnel. It is composed mostly of green hues with touches of other pigments. According to Sotheby's, it features the parish church in Hythe and on the left side Saltwood Castle. Turner chose not to exhibit the painting, considering it too experimental after similar works had been criticised.

On 5 July 1984, it was sold at auction at Sotheby's in London to a private collector for $10,023,200, the highest sum paid for a Turner painting at the time. An 1836 Turner painting titled Juliet and Her Nurse had previously sold at Sotheby's in New York for $6.4 million in May 1980. The seascape, along with approximately 200 other artworks, was from the estate of British art historian Kenneth Clark and was sold by his son, Alan Clark, following his father's death. Clark had decided to sell the collection to pay for estate taxes but said that his father considered the Turner to be "the finest painting in the world" and would never have sold it. The painting had hung in the Clark home of Saltwood Castle before its sale. Guinness World Records recorded it as the most expensive painting of a seascape. Kenneth Clark had purchased the painting in 1950 from D. J. Molteno, the grandson of Sir Donald Currie, who had accumulated a significant Turner collection.

Following the auction, Sotheby's reported that the painting's anonymous buyer had offered the painting for a four-month display at the National Gallery in London, but it had been declined due to refurbishment.

Robert Wark, curator at the Huntington Museum and Library in San Marino described the seascape as "an important, late Turner painting". Its swirling colours were described as "lovely" and "almost abstract" by Florence Elisabeth Coman, interim curator of modern paintings at the National Gallery of Art.

== See also ==
- List of paintings by J. M. W. Turner
