= Wu Bin (painter) =

Chinese painter (1573–1620)

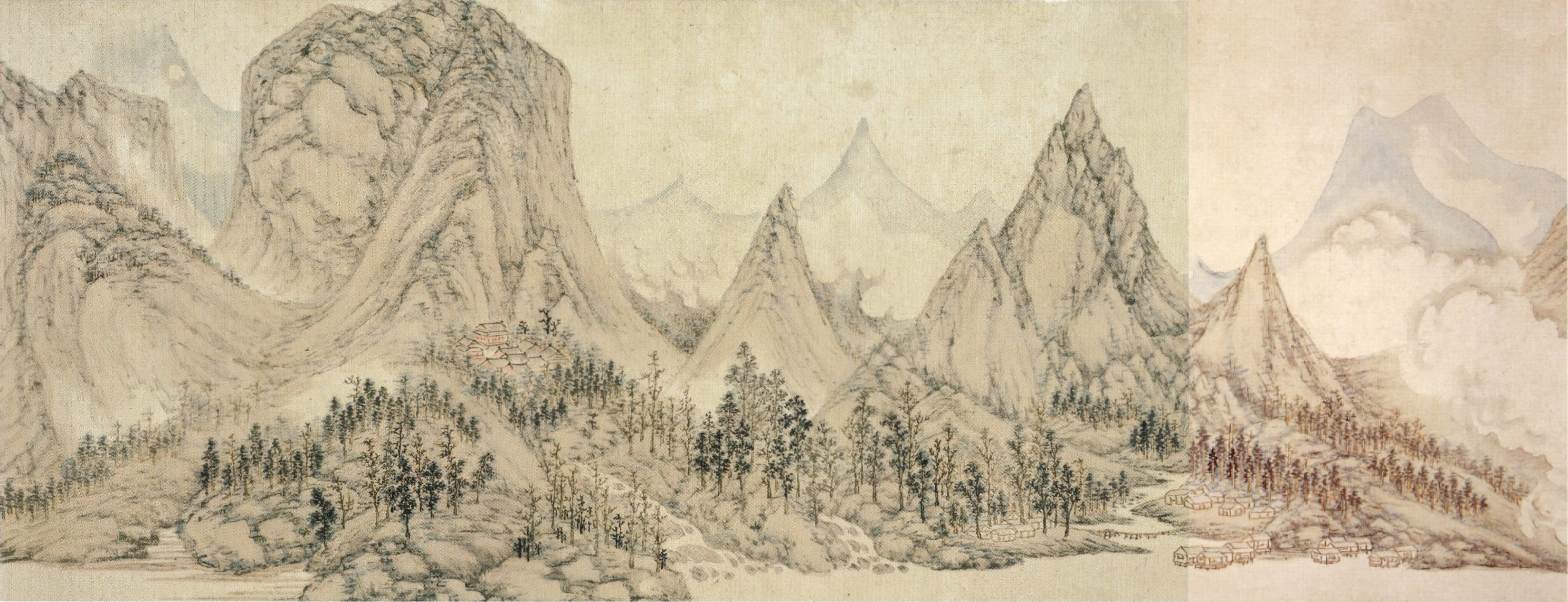
Detail of landscape by Wu Bin, ink and color on paper, 1610; Honolulu Museum of Art

Wu Bin (simplified Chinese: 吴彬; traditional Chinese: 吳彬; pinyin: Wú Bīn; Wade–Giles: Wu Pin) was a Ming dynasty Chinese landscape painter during the reign of the Wanli Emperor (r. 1573–1620). His courtesy name was "Wenzhong" and his art name "Zhiyin Toutuo" means "Mendicant monk at the temple hidden by tree branches". His specific dates of birth and death are unknown. Wu was born in Putian in the Fujian province, and was linked to the Ōbaku Buddhism sect, having painted a large Nirvana scene for them.

Educated as one of the literati and skilled as a painter, he worked mainly in Nanjing about 1590–1610. He became a devout follower of Buddhism and lived and worked in a Buddhist temple. In Nanjing, he often depicted Buddhist arhats behaving as magicians, performing superstitious rituals and healing practices to satisfy requests made by religious men and women. These are colorful portraits where irony and sarcasm prevail. The 1591 handscroll entitled "The 16 Luohans" exemplifies such work. He also produced 500 arhat hanging scrolls in Qixia Temple in Nanjing in about 1601, some of which have survived.

It is uncertain whether he worked for the vice imperial government in Nanjing. Mi Wanzong (1570－1628), a high ranking government officer, calligrapher, and painter, was his patron from about ACE1600. Wu Bin moved to Beijing with Mi Wanzong's support in about 1610, where he produced several masterpieces such as a landscape of Mi's Garden and ten portraits of a marvelous rock which Mi had appreciated. The latter, "Ten Views of Lingbi Rock", is one of the world's most expensive paintings.

The Beijing imperial court assigned him the status for a professional technocrat as painter. There are no records of him after 1626, with some sources indicating that he was purged by the powerful and notorious eunuch Wei Zhongxian.

== Works ==
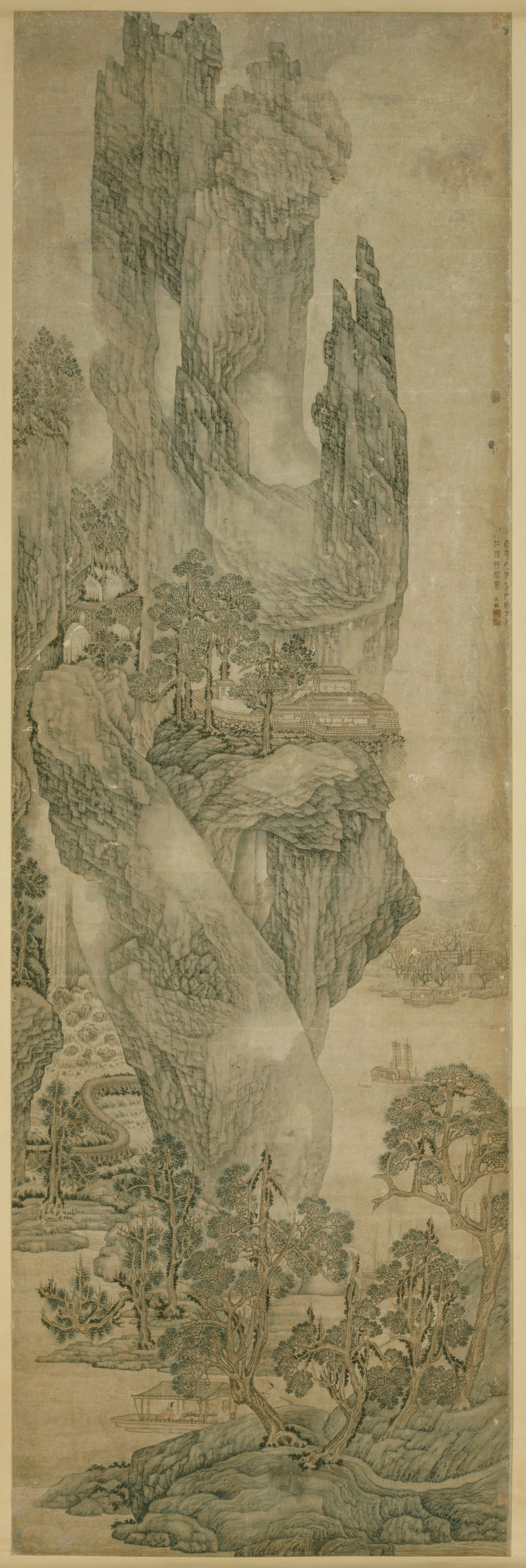
Pine Lodge amid Tall Mountains (Asian Art Museum, San Francisco)

- Asian Art Museum, San Francisco
  - "Pine Lodge amid Tall Mountains"
- Cleveland Museum of Art
  - Greeting the Spring (Landscape Handscroll) in 1600.
  - Five Hundred arhat handscroll
- Metropolitan Museum of Art
  - Sixteen Arhats Handscroll in 1591 "The 16 Luohans"
- Honolulu Museum of Art
  - Landscape Handscroll
- Shanghai Museum
  - Journey in San Yin, handscroll, Ink and color on Paper
- Palace Museum, Beijing
  - Arhats

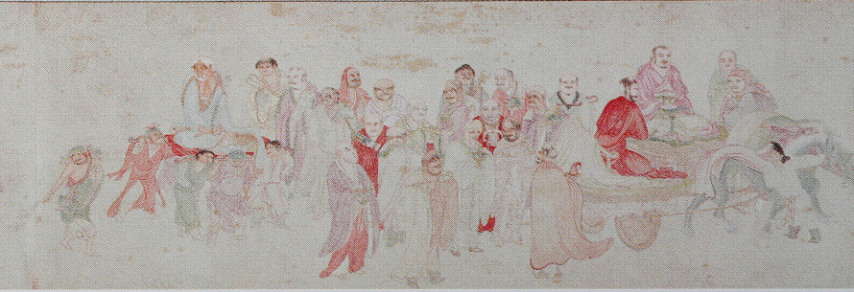
500 arhats (Cleveland Museum of Art)
