= Men in Her Life (painting) =

1962 painting by Andy Warhol

- Artist: Andy Warhol
- Year: 1962
- Dimensions: 214.6 cm × 211.5 cm (84.5 in × 83.3 in)
- Location: Private collection

Men in Her Life is a 1962 painting by Andy Warhol. It is a black and white painting inspired by the life of Elizabeth Taylor, a seven foot tall creation of the artist.

== Painting style ==
It is a series of photos picturing the most important men in the life of Elizabeth Taylor, including her third husband Mike Todd and her future husband Eddie Fisher.

== History and price ==
The painting was sold for $63,362,500 in 2010 by Phillips de Pury & Co. The final sum was a surprise even for the organizers, which evaluated the painting at 40 million dollars initially. The name of the buyer was not disclosed to the public - though it has been reported to be Sheikh Hamad bin Khalifa Al-Thani.

== See also ==
- List of most expensive paintings
