= Nelly Arrieta de Blaquier =

Argentine sugar heiress, art collector and patron

- Born: María Elena Arrieta
- Died: 15 November 2020
- Occupations: Heiress, art collector and patron
- Spouse: Carlos Pedro Blaquier
- Children: 5

María Elena "Nelly" Arrieta de Blaquier (died 15 November 2020) was an Argentine sugar heiress, art collector and patron.

She was the only child of Herminio Arrieta, who worked at Ledesma, and his wife Paulina "Paulette" Wollmann, and Nelly became the sole heir to the Ledesma sugar company.

In 1951, she married Carlos Pedro Blaquier, and they had five children.

== Art collection ==
Nelly Arrieta de Blaquier began collecting art with her husband in the 1960s, working with dealers including Lefevre and Wildenstein to acquire Impressionist and Modern art.

She chaired the Asociación Amigos del Museo Nacional de Bellas Artes (Friends of Museo Nacional de Bellas Artes (Buenos Aires)) from 1977 to 2011, and was honorary president until her death.

== Legacy ==
Artworks from Blaquier's collection were to be auctioned at Sotheby's on November 18, 2026.
