= Carlos Pedro Blaquier =

Argentinian businessman and art collector

- Born: 28 August 1927; Buenos Aires, Argentina
- Died: 13 March 2023 (aged 95)
- Occupations: Businessman and art collector
- Spouse: Nelly Arrieta de Blaquier
- Children: 5

Carlos Pedro Blaquier (28 August 1927 - 13 March 2023) was an Argentine businessman and art collector.

He was the son-in-law of Herminio Arrieta (1900-1970), who owned and ran Haras La Biznaga, an agribusiness and later thoroughbred racehorse breeding and training farm.

Blaquier was president of Ledesma, Argentina's leading sugar producer, from 1970 until 2013.

In 1951, he married the sugar heiress Nelly Arrieta de Blaquier, who was the sole heir to the Ledesma company.

In 2012, Judge Fernando Luis Povina charged Blaquier with "being the main participant in 29 cases of unlawful detention" in 1976, when during military rule, police used power cuts to kidnap suspected left-wing activists, 30 of whom remained missing in 2012. Blaquier denied wrongdoing and died before any trial could happen.

In November 2026, Sotheby's New York will be selling some of their Impressionist and Post-Impressionist collection valued at US$450 million. The couple had been separated for decades, and the collection is being sold by their five children, María Elena, Carlos, Alejandro, Santiago and Ignacio.
