= Center for Italian Modern Art =

- Location: 421 Broome Street, New York City, New York
- Coordinates: 40°43′16″N 73°59′55.7″W
- Type: Art museum
- Founder: Laura Mattioli
- Website: italianmodernart.org

The Center for Italian Modern Art (Cima) was an American art museum and research center in the SoHo district of Manhattan, in New York that specialized in Italian modern and contemporary art. It existed as a 501(c)(3) organization from 2013 to 2024 but did not have its own collection.

== Exhibitions ==
During its existence, Cima mounted annual exhibitions, many of which came from the collection of Gianni Mattioli, father of the museum's founder. Among its 13 exhibitions that focused on Italian artists not often seen in the United States were those devoted to Fortunato Depero, Giorgio Morandi and Medardo Rosso. In 2017–2018 twenty-two paintings by Alberto Savinio were shown. Works by Marino were exhibited in 2019 and 2020. In 2021 it had an exhibition of paintings from the 1960s by Mario Schifano, and in 2023 its primary exhibit was on Corrado Cagli. An exhibit on Nanni Balestrini was the museum's last.

CIMA also sponsored scholarly research, hosting 42 residential fellows and supporting ten travel fellows. It also published an online journal, Italian Modern Art and offered fellowships for study at the center or in Italy.

In June 2024, the museum announced it would close later that month, citing lingering issues from the COVID-19 pandemic, including the cost of transporting art, but it hoped to find a home for its archives and work.
