= Nu couché =

1917 painting by Amedeo Modigliani

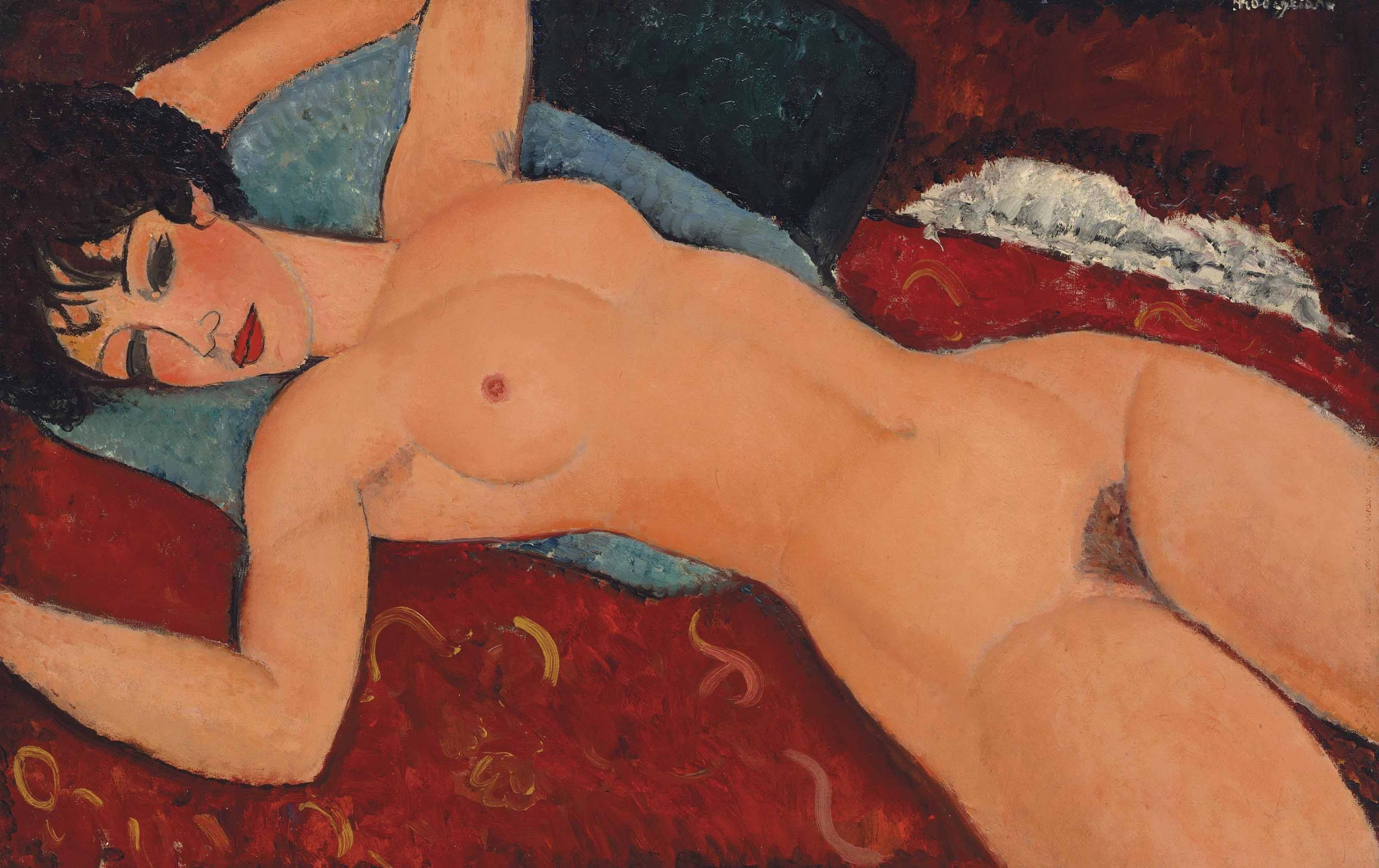
- Artist: Amedeo Modigliani
- Year: 1917
- Medium: Oil on canvas
- Dimensions: 60 cm × 92 cm (24 in × 36 in)
- Location: Private collection of Liu Yiqian

Nu couché (also known in English as Red Nude or Reclining Nude) is a 1917 oil on canvas painting by the Italian artist Amedeo Modigliani. It is one of his most widely reproduced and exhibited paintings.

== Painting ==
The painting is one of a famous series of nudes that Modigliani painted in 1917 under the patronage of his Polish dealer Léopold Zborowski. It is believed to have been included in Modigliani's first and only art show in 1917, at the Galerie Berthe Weill, which was shut down by the police. Christie's lot notes for their November 2015 sale of the painting observed that this group of nudes by Modigliani served to reaffirm and reinvigorate the nude as a subject of modernist art.

== Commentary ==
The Guardian art critic Jonathan Jones claims that Modigliani continues the tradition of Titian's Venus of Urbino "glorifying the human body infuses the sexuality of Modigliani's nude", reinvented a decade before by the paintings of Pablo Picasso and Henri Matisse. Jones states that "Modigliani is a religious artist and his religion is desire."

== Provenance ==
- Léopold Zborowski, Paris.
- Jonas Netter, Paris.
- Riccardo and Cesarina Gualino, Turin (acquired in Paris, 2 October 1928).
- Società Anonima Finanziaria, Zaccaria Pisa, Milan; collection sale, Galleria Pesaro, Milan, 5–8 February 1934, lot 185.
- Pietro Feroldi, Brescia (by 1935).
- Gianni Mattioli, Milan (acquired from the above, 1949)
- by descent to Laura Mattioli Rossi (1977)
- Liu Yiqian, Shanghai, 2015 (sold at Christie's, New York, 9 November 2015 for $170,405,000).

== 2015 sale ==
The painting realized $170,405,000 at a Christie's New York sale on 9 November 2015, a record for a Modigliani painting and placing it high among the most expensive paintings ever sold. The purchaser was the Chinese businessman Liu Yiqian. Liu paid for the painting using his American Express Centurion Card..

== See also ==
- Paintings by Amedeo Modigliani
- List of most expensive paintings
