= Museo d'Arte Moderna di Bologna =

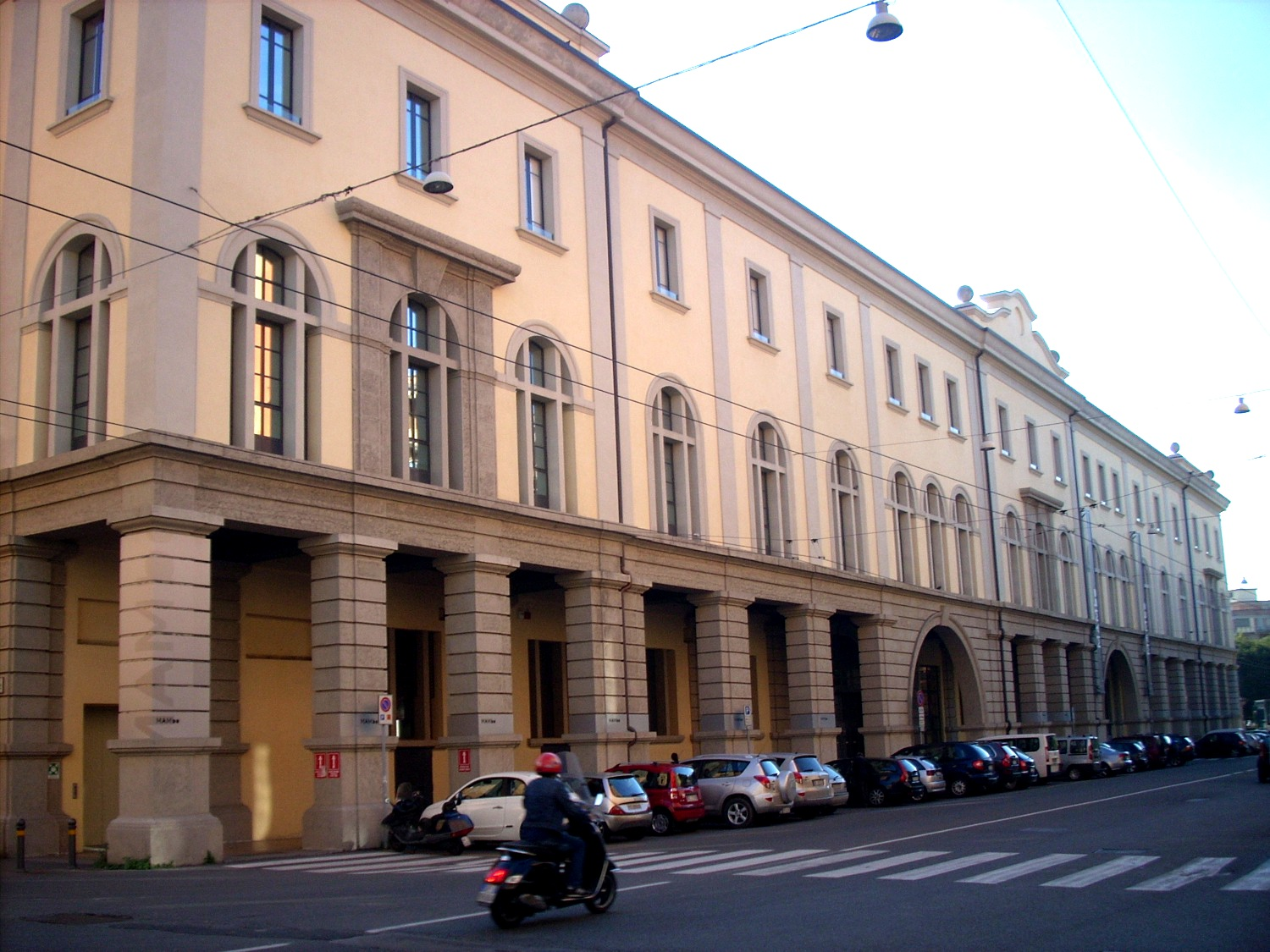

- Bologna
- Established: May 5, 2007
- Location: Via Don Minzoni 14, Bologna, Italy
- Coordinates: 44.5025°N 11.3369°E
- Type: Art museum
- Visitors: 93,942 (2008)
- Director: Laura Carlini Fanfogna
- President: Lorenzo Sassoli de Bianchi
- Website: mambo-bologna.org

The Museo d'Arte Moderna di Bologna or MAMbo is a purpose-designed modern and experimental art museum in Bologna, Italy — and which includes The Museo Morandi, a collection of more than 250 works by noted painter, Giorgio Morandi (1890–1964).

== History ==
Now an independent entity, MAMbo was originally one of the three museums that came under the aegis of the Galleria d'Arte Moderna of Bologna (1925-) along with the Modern Art Gallery at Villa delle Rose and the Museo Morandi in the city's main square, Piazza Maggiore.

MAMbo became a separate entity in the 1990s, when the collections of the Galleria d'Arte Moderna had grown so large, by acquisition and bequest, requiring more space its art collection and exhibitions.

== Mission ==
Director Sassoli de Bianchi re-conceived the museum as having not only a role in Bologna's culture but also Italian culture, adapting the museum to a new premises in a former industrial bakery building in Bologna's Porto district and rebranding the museum with the acronym, MAMbo.

At the same time, the museum tightened its focus from contemporary art in general to experimental art in particular, rooted in Bologna's art and university heritage.

Supporting this focus on experimental art, Sassoli de Bianchi hired art critic and museum manager Gianfranco Maraniello; in 2005, appointing him Director.

The museum simultaneously gained a new mission, not just as a permanent exhibition and exhibition space, but as an experimental, informational and social hub for young contemporary artists, providing a regional, national and international context, the latter through the International Contemporary Art Network.

== Reopening ==
The new premises opened on 5 May 2007 and in their first year hosted a range of exhibitions, installations, performances, musical events, films and multimedia experiences which quickly established MAMbo's reputation as a leading experimental museum in Italy and one of Europe's foremost creative centres of contemporary art. MAMbo is a leading partner in the Didart art teaching project supported by the EU Culture Programme.
