= Laura Mattioli =

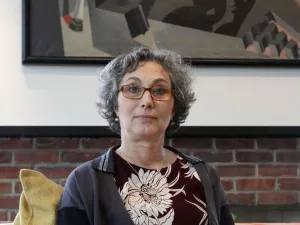
Laura Mattioli

Laura Mattioli (born 28 May 1950) is an Italian art historian, a collector and a curator. From 2013 until its 2024 closure, she was President of the Center for Modern Italian Art in New York City.

== Early life and education ==
Mattioli was born in Milan, Italy. Her father was the Milanese collector Gianni Mattioli, who started collecting during the Second World War, building his collection in 1943, after he saw the first massacre of Jews carried out by the Nazis in Italy. In 1949, he acquired 87 works from fellow Italian collector Pietro Feroldi.

Mattioli's childhood was unconventional and most of her younger years were spent with nannies and, rather than friends, artists, critics and intellectuals her parents would see regularly including modernist Mario Sironi, art historian Fernanda Wittgens, Giorgio Morandi, Fortunato Depero, Giacomo Manzù and Marino Marini .

Her art education includes studying at Università Cattolica del Sacro Cuore in Milan (PhD in History of Art), Università degli Studi in Milan (BS in Art History) and Liceo Giuseppe Parini in Milan.

== Career ==
Mattioli had not planned to be involved in art. Her father had other ideas and had Laura begin training in art history with a family friend.

From 1975 to 1981, she taught at the Università degli studi di Milano and at the Accademia Carrara from 1992 to 1999. Along with teaching, Mattioli has organized many exhibitions including:

- Barry X Ball. Pietà. 2018. Museo d'Arte Antica Milan, Italy.
- Metaphysical Masterpieces 1916-1920: Morandi, Sironi, and Carrà. October 2018–June 2019. CIMA, New York.
- Barry X Ball, "Portraits and Masterpieces in Venice", 4 June - 11 September 2011. Museo del Settecento Veneziano di Ca’ Rezzonico.
- Giorgio Morandi et l’abstraction du réel. June–September 2010. Hôtel départemental des arts du Var, Toulon, France.
- Boccioni pittore scultore futurista, Palazzo Reale, Milan (6 October 2006 – 25 February 2007)
- Morandi Ultimo, nature morte 1950–1964, December 1997–February 1998, Galleria dello Scudo, Verona; April–September 1998. Peggy Guggenheim Collection, Venice.
- Boccioni’s Materia: A Futurist Masterpiece and the European Avant-Garde

In 2003, she wrote an essay for the book "The Mattioli Collection: Masterpieces of the Italian Avant-garde" by Italian Art Historian Flavio Fergonzia.

In 1999, she edited Foppa e la Cappella Portinari, Milan, which includes her essay, "I restauri: interventi e interpretazioni (The restorations, interventions and interpretations)."

Since 1983 she has been the curator responsible for the collection of her father, Gianni Mattioli.

Mattioli established the Center for Italian Modern Art, a public nonprofit exhibit and research center, in 2013.
