= Doucai =

Technique in painting Chinese porcelain

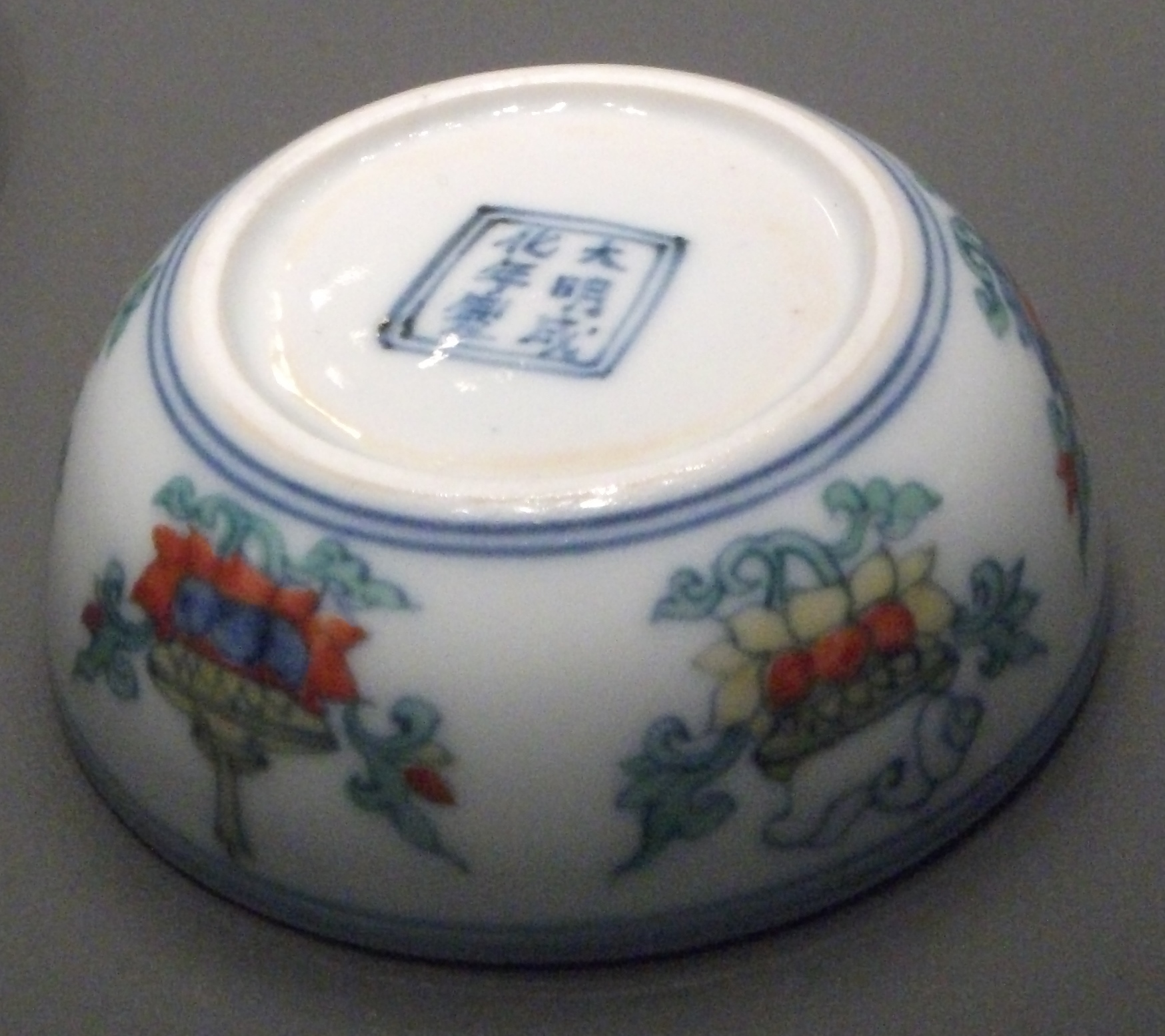
Small cup with the "Five Treasures", Chenghua reign mark, 2.9 × 7 cm, PDF.767.

Doucai (Chinese: 斗彩; Wade–Giles: tou-ts'ai) is a technique in painting Chinese porcelain, where parts of the design, and some outlines of the rest, are painted in underglaze blue, and the piece is then glazed and fired. The rest of the design is then added in overglaze enamels of different colours and the piece fired again at a lower temperature of about 850°C to 900°C.

The style began in the 15th century under the Ming dynasty in the imperial factories at Jingdezhen, and its finest products come from a few years in the reign of the Chenghua Emperor, mostly small pieces like the famous Chicken cups. The style was discontinued after a few decades, as a suitable overglaze blue was developed, but later revived under the Qing dynasty. It is not to be confused with the wucai style, which was a related early technique for polychrome painting. Doucai can be translated as "contrasted colours", "fitted colours", "colours which fit together" or "dove-tailed colours".

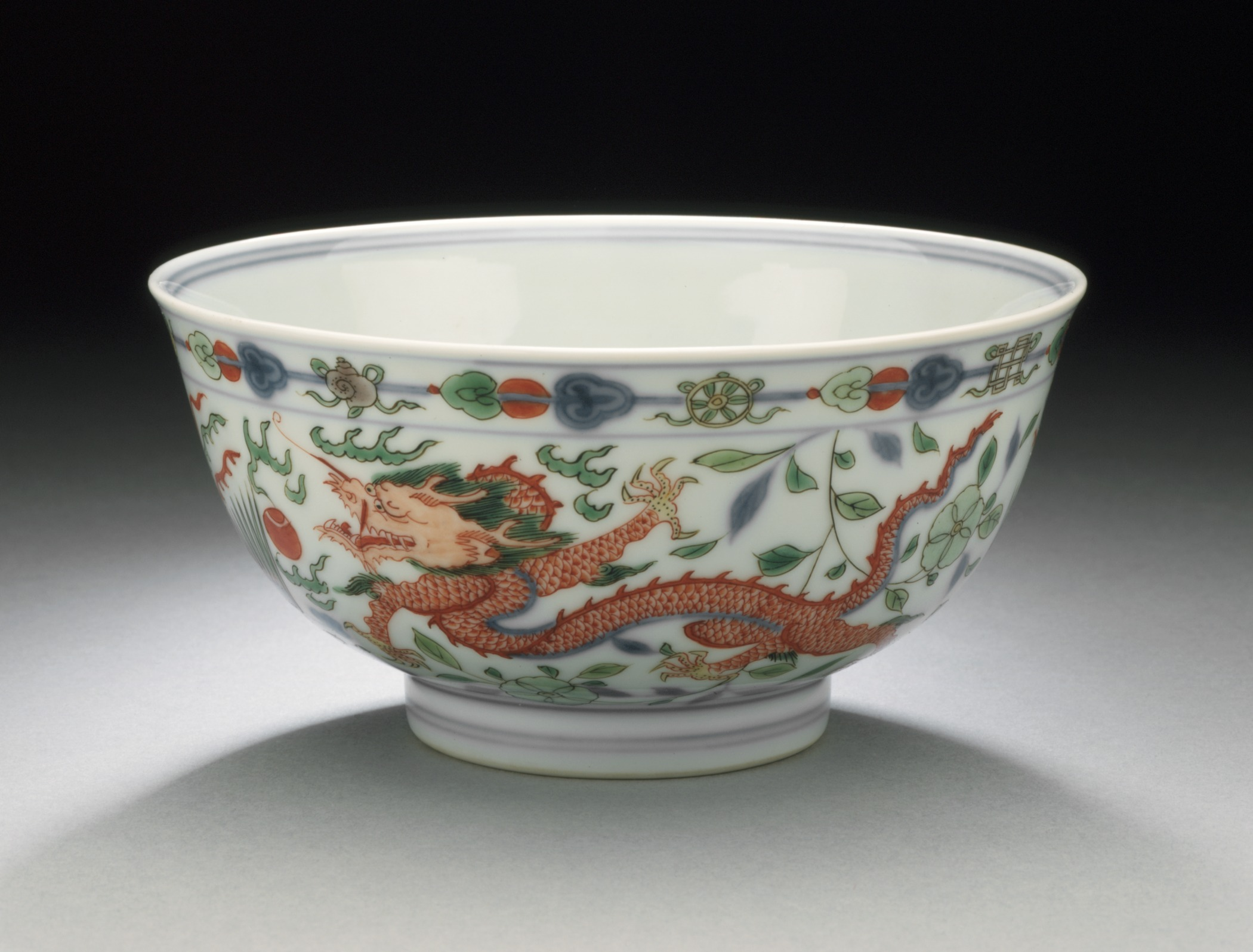
Bowl with dragon chasing flaming pearl, Kangxi reign, 1662–1722

The technique was driven by the restrictions of the materials available at the time. The Chinese had developed high-fired porcelain, and found two colours that produced good results when painted under the glaze, even when fired at high temperatures. Blue and white porcelain was being produced in enormous quantities, and was well understood. There was also a less reliable red, derived from copper. But the other colours known to the Chinese turned black or brown at the temperatures required for porcelain; indeed a number of surviving examples have discoloured enamels but unaffected bodies and underglaze colour, after being caught in one of the many fires in Chinese palaces. Furthermore, the cobalt blue used for blue and white discoloured if used over the glaze, even at lower temperatures. The Jindezhen potters eventually arrived at the doucai technique to overcome these problems.

== History ==
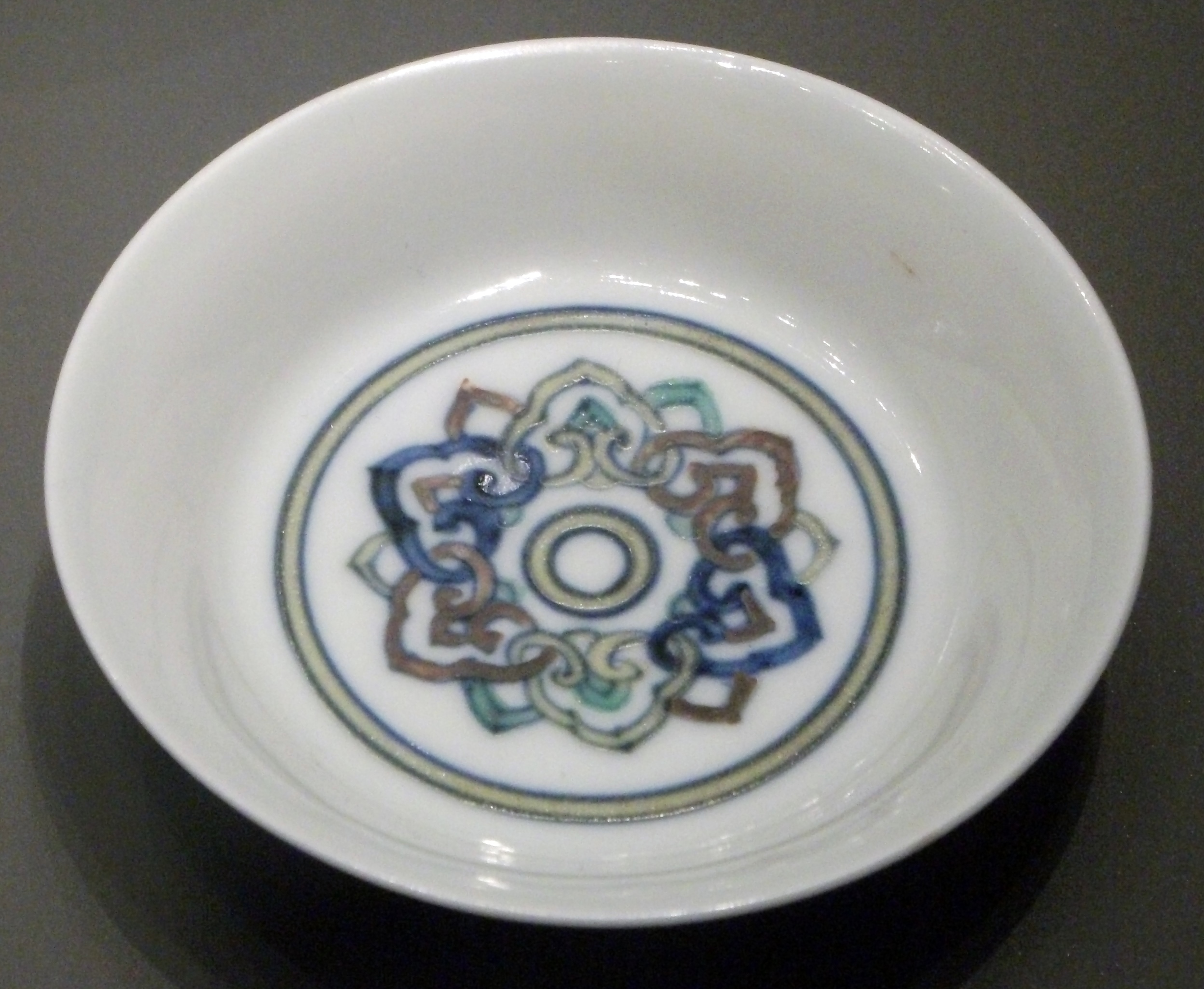
Interior of Chenghua dish, 23 millimetres high, 84 wide, PDF,A.780

Polychrome cloisonné, using enamels on thin metal bodies, had been introduced as a "courtly invention of the early fifteenth century made exclusively for palace and court temple use". It tended to use porcelain shapes, and the imperial potters may have felt pressure to compete. Before 1850 a range of two-colour combinations, on a white background, were ordered by the court. The doucai technique may have been derived from that of cloisonné.

The doucai technique appeared in the reign of the Xuande Emperor (1426–1435), from which a dish with red and green enamels was excavated at the Jindezhen kilns. The technique achieved its first and finest flowering in the last years of the Chenghua Emperor, who reigned from 1464 to 1487, but the doucai pieces all date between 1472 and 1487, and are extremely rare. The emperor seems to have taken a personal interest in the wares, which are mostly small and fit comfortably in the hand. According to tradition, his ambitious concubine and former nanny Consort Wan encouraged him in this taste, and may have inspired it. Objects decorated with chickens were symbols of fertility and often given at weddings, and it seems Wan liked to give the emperor a daily gift, which in the case of the "chicken cups" may have represented her desire for children. He was also a devout Buddhist, and several pieces have Buddhist inscriptions and symbols.

After the Chenghua period the quality of imperial porcelain slowly declined for the rest of the Ming dynasty, and when quality revived under the Qing the Chenghua period had already acquired a reputation, which it has largely retained, as the finest period of Chinese porcelain.

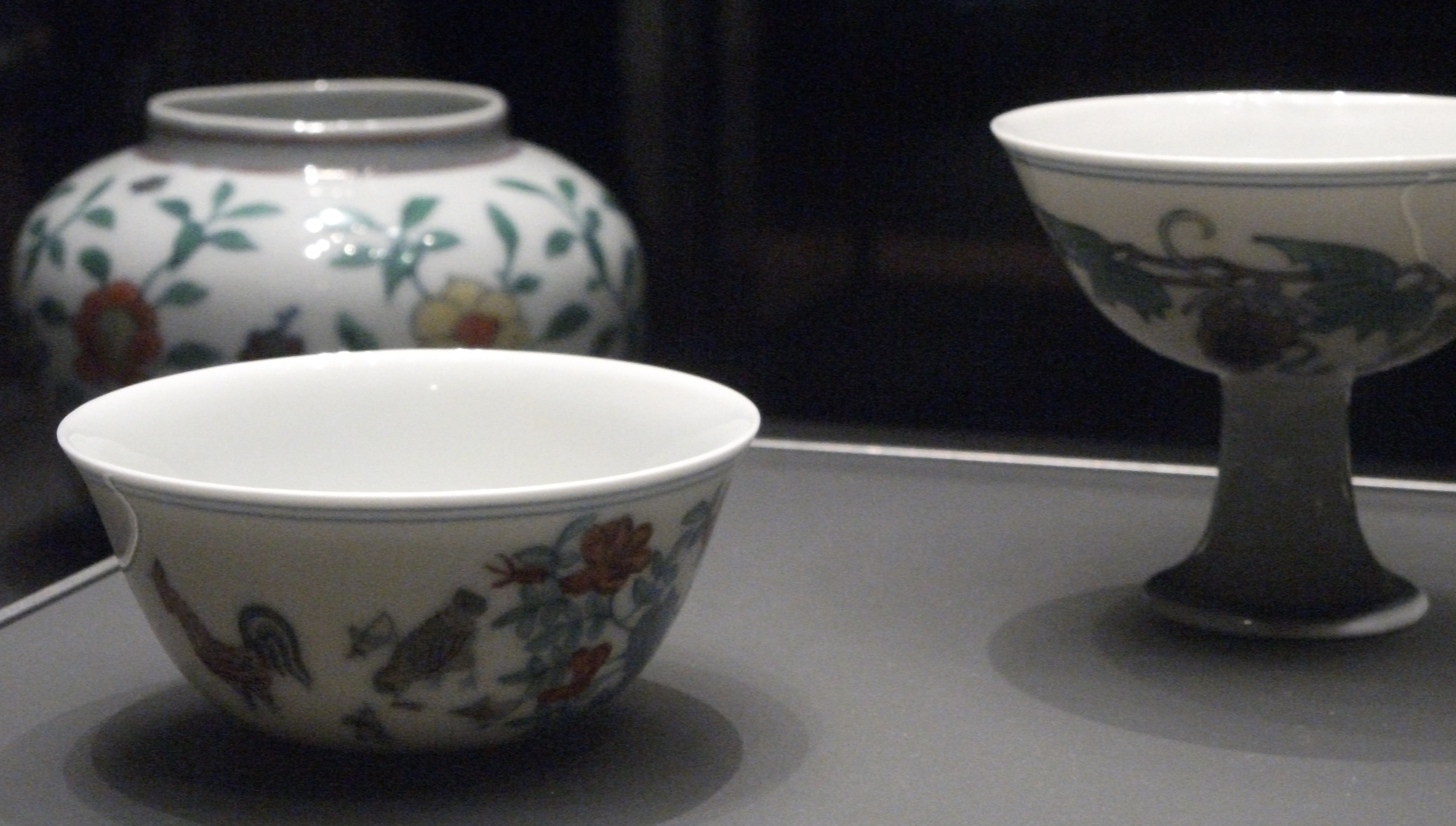
Chenghua pieces, 1464–87; in the foreground a "chicken cup" like that sold in 2014 at Sotheby's.

Chenghua wine cups were already fetching very high prices among collectors during the reign of the Wanli Emperor (1573–1619), and in the 18th century there are various literary references to "chicken cups" as objects of great value, including an episode in Dream of the Red Chamber by Cao Xueqin (d. 1763), one of the Four Great Classical Novels of China. The Qianlong Emperor wrote a poem about the cups.

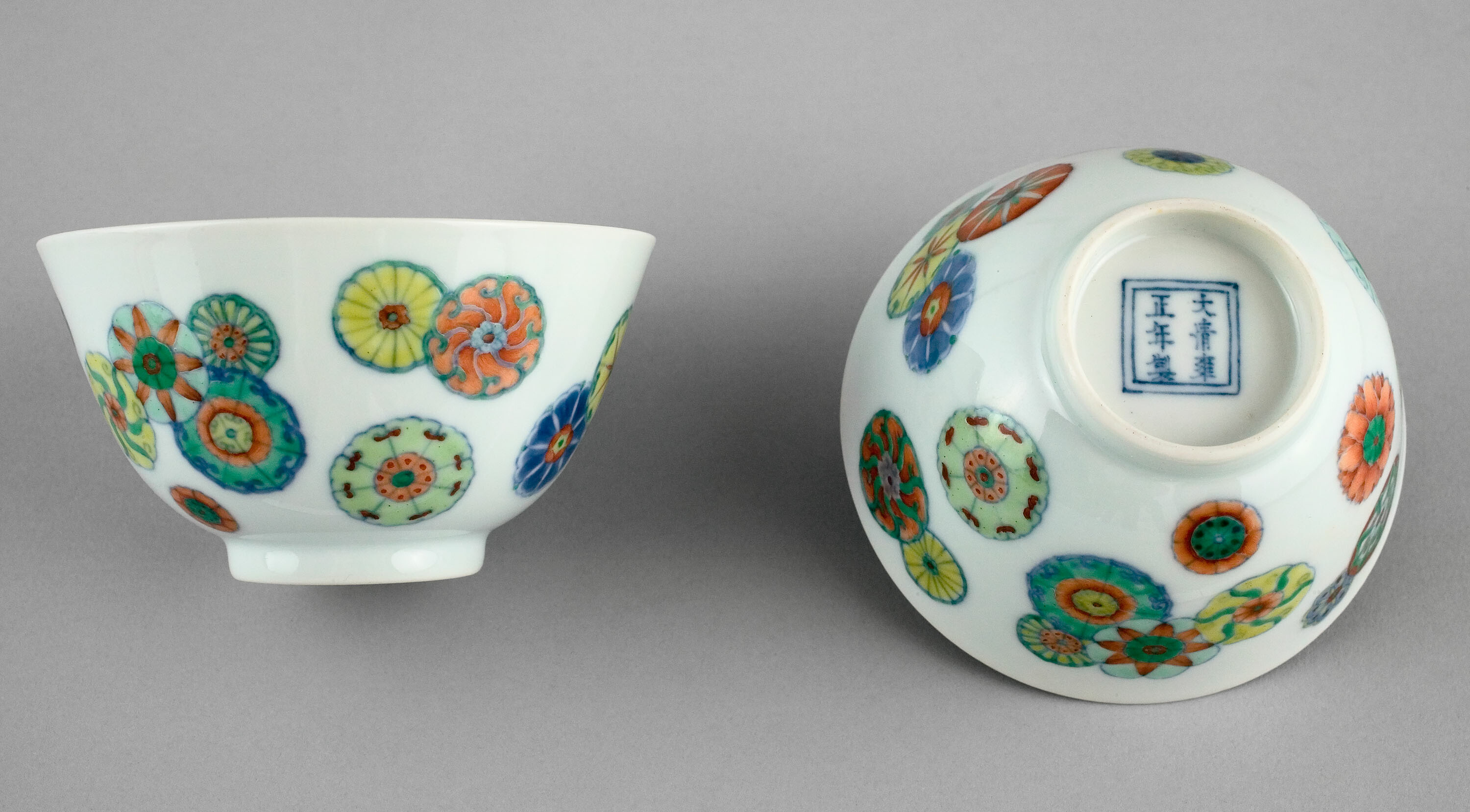
Yongzheng Emperor mark and period, (1723–1735)

There was a certain revival of the style in the Wanli period, and a larger one under the Yongzheng Emperor (1723–1735) of the Qing dynasty. Pieces were occasionally produced thereafter, in particular of the chicken cups and stem cups with grapes, two of the most admired designs of the Chenghua period. The discovery and examination by the archaeologist Liu Xinyuan (劉新園) and his team of a heap of discarded broken porcelains of the Chenghua period at the imperial kiln site at Jingdezhen "revolutionised scholars' knowledge of patterns and forms of doucai".

In 2014, the "Meiyintang Chicken Cup", a small doucai wine cup 8.2 cm wide, achieved a world record price for Chinese ceramics, selling at Sotheby's in Hong Kong for 281,240,000HKD (US$36.05 million), bought by Liu Yiqian. Later pieces can also fetch high prices.

== Characteristics ==
The rare Chenghua pieces are small, but of very high quality. They are thin-walled porcelain of the standard Jingdezhen porcelain of the time. Decoration is restrained, with relatively large parts of the surfaces left as white background; often bowls are only decorated on their outside. The colours in Chenghua pieces are the underglaze blue, and overglaze red, green, yellow and an aubergine (eggplant) purple-brown. This last is transparent and can be used over the other colours, requiring yet another firing. Most pieces carry a six-character reign mark, and the Chenghua mark became "the most widely imitated of all marks" in later periods.

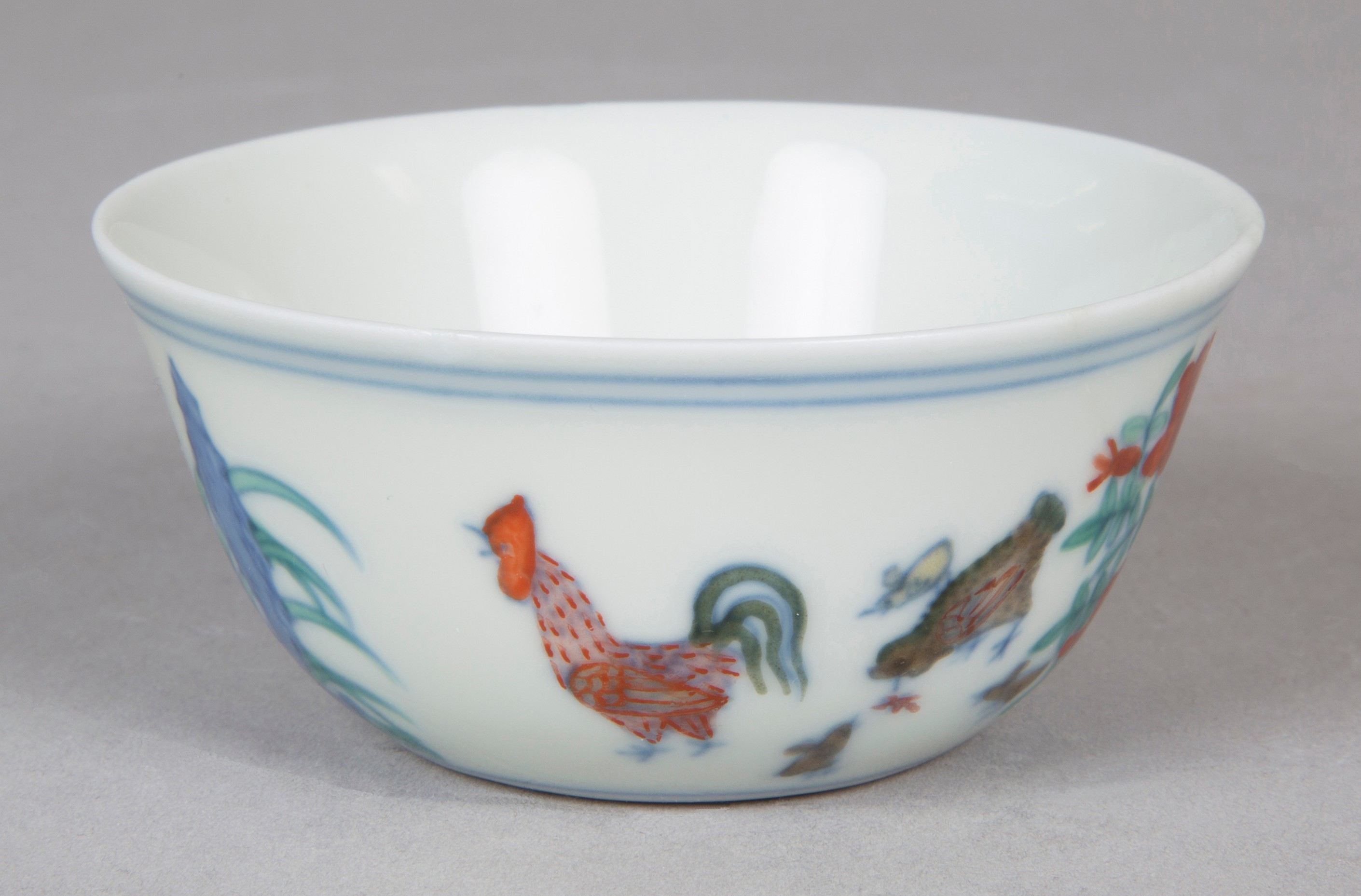
Chicken cup, Chenghua mark and period (1465–87)

The small "chicken cups", typically only some 8 cm wide and 4 cm high, have been often imitated in later periods. The subject was inspired by paintings. The Chenghua examples used successive layers of enamel to represent texture and shading; by imitations from the 18th century, this could be achieved within a single coat. Doucai pieces from the 18th century and later are either imitations of the small Chenghua pieces, or much larger shapes typical of contemporary wares, where doucai has been adopted as a technique largely as a nod to the past.

The usual distinction made with the wucai technique, which also combines underglaze blue with overglaze enamels in other colours, is that in doucai the whole design is painted or outlined in the blue, even if parts are overlaid by the enamels and invisible in the finished product. However, this is not true of all pieces classified as doucai, especially from the 18th century onwards. Fragments of incomplete examples, only done in blue, have been excavated from waste tips at the kiln. In wucai only parts of the design include blue, and these cover wider areas, and are often rather freely painted.

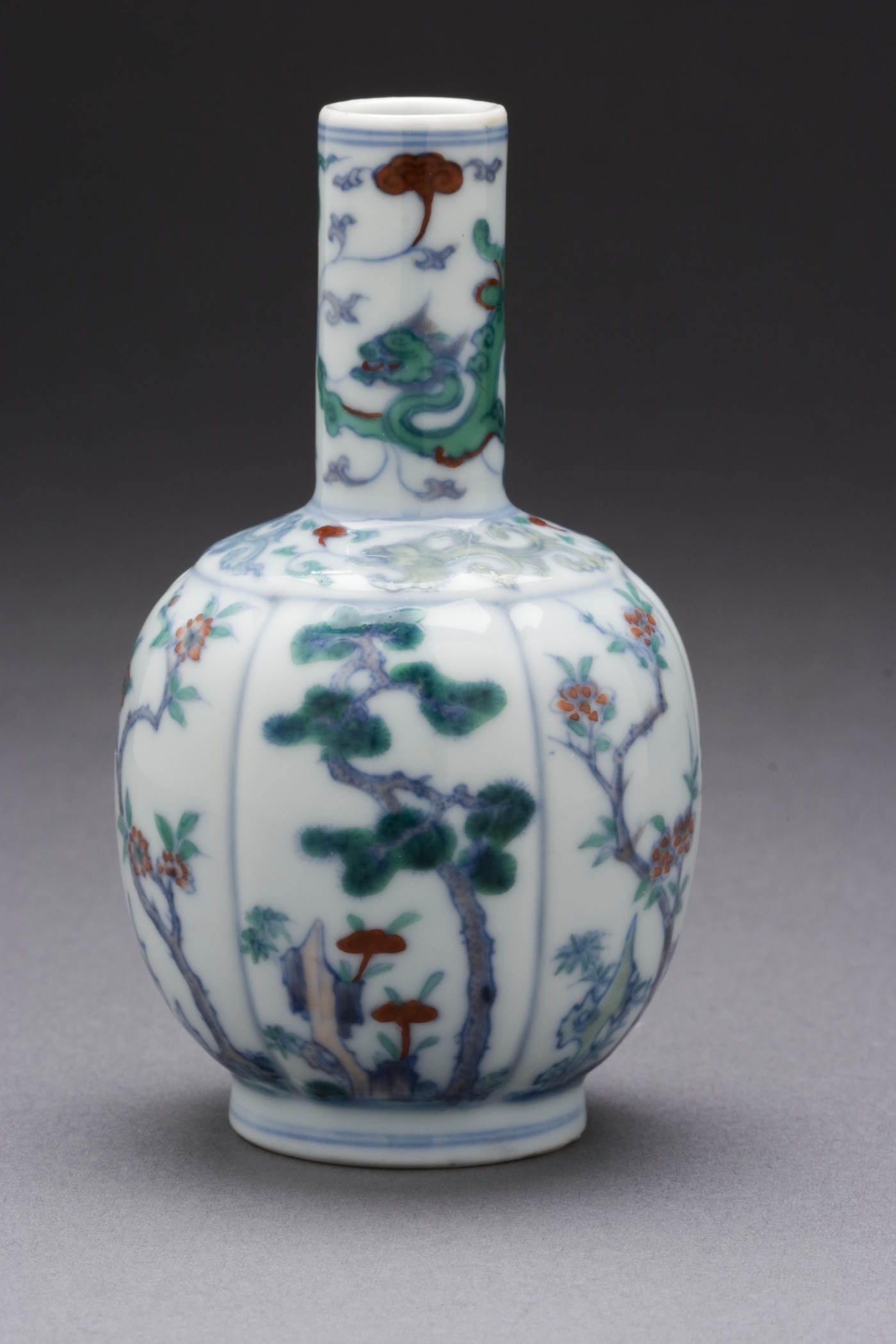
Vase with Pine, Bamboo, Plum, Camellia, and Dragon Yongzheng reign, 1723–1735

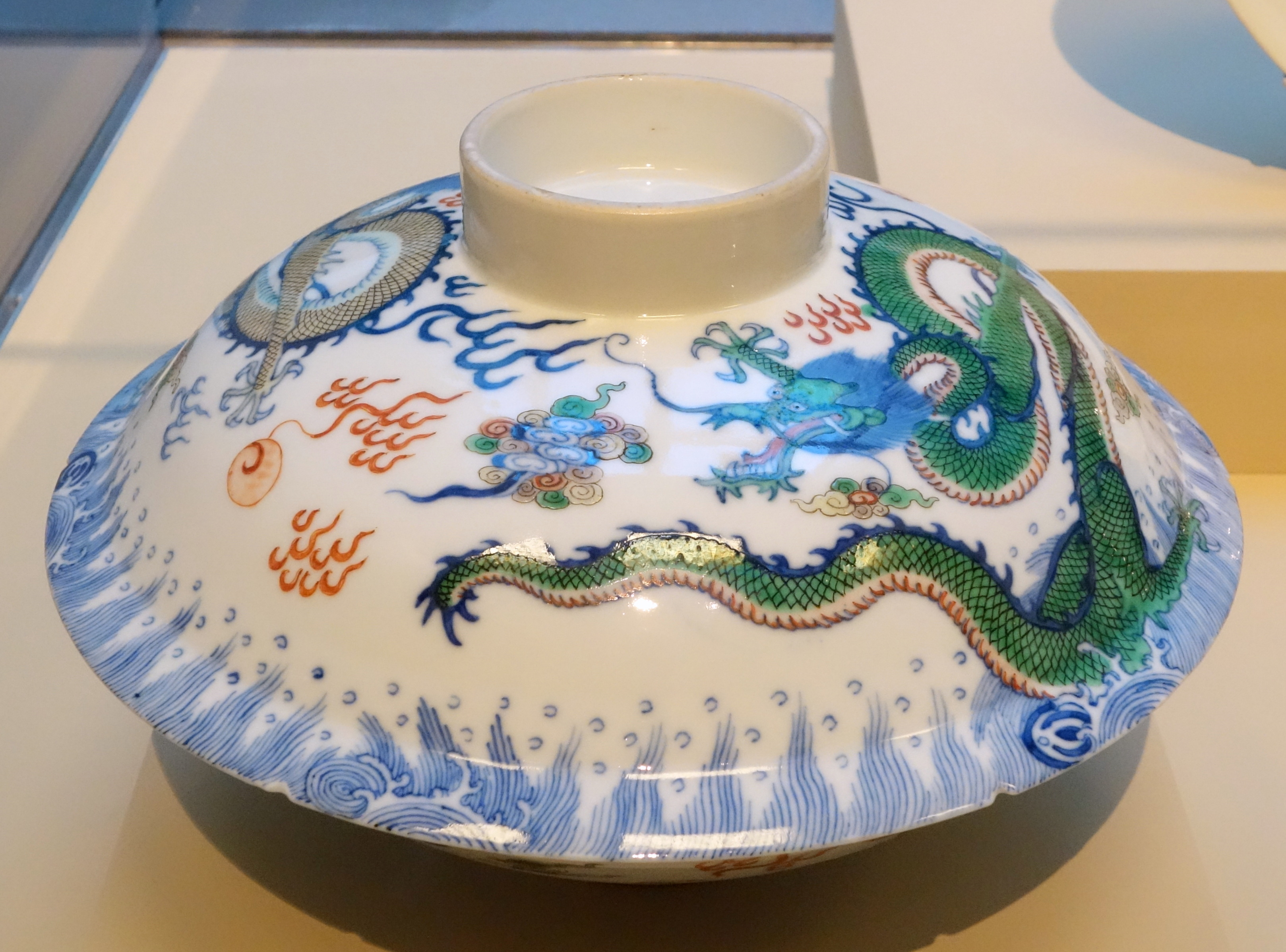
Covered bowl with dragons in the Taoist Eastern Ocean, Yongzheng reign

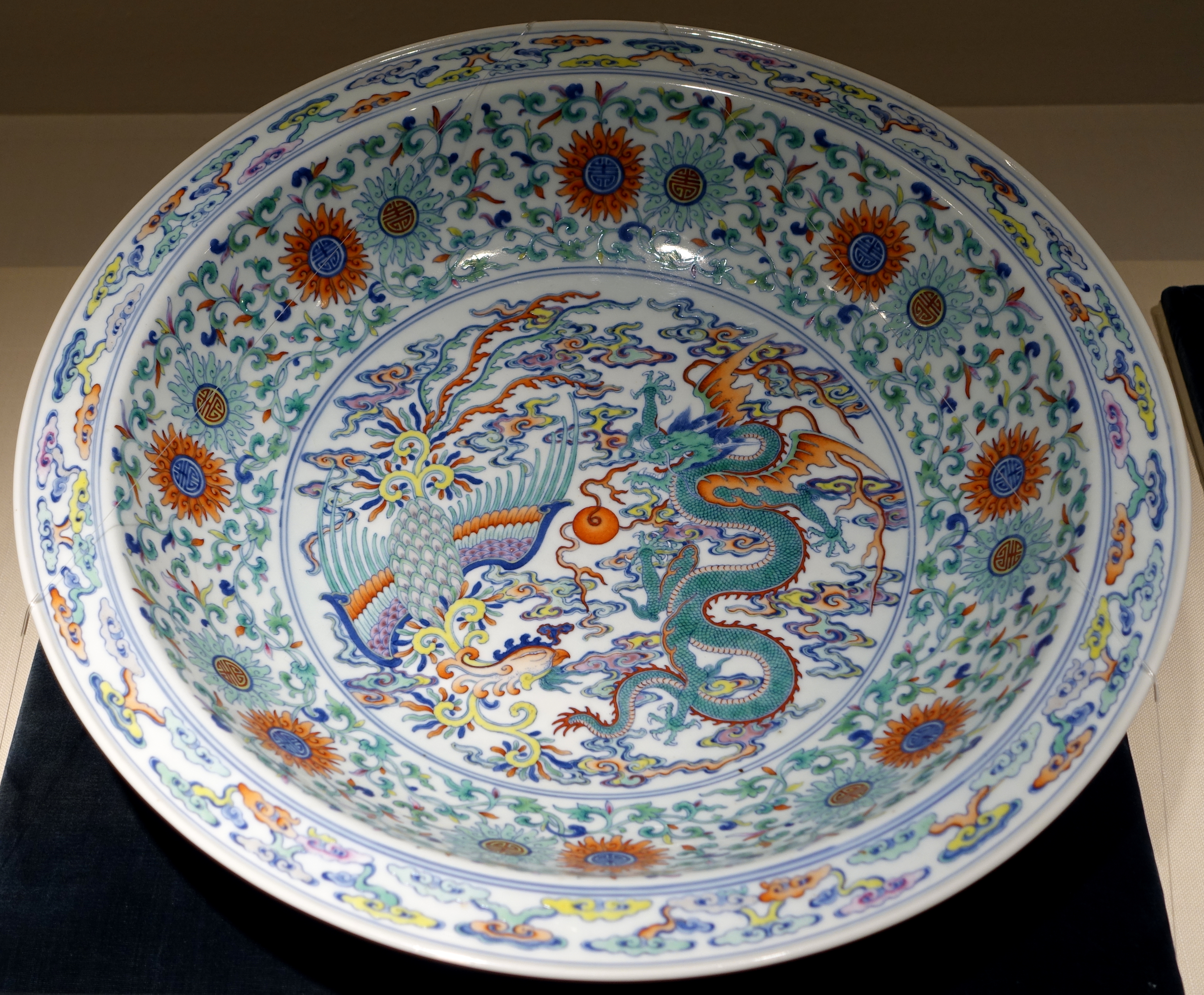
One of a pair of large dishes with dragon and phoenix design, Yongzheng period, 1723–1735

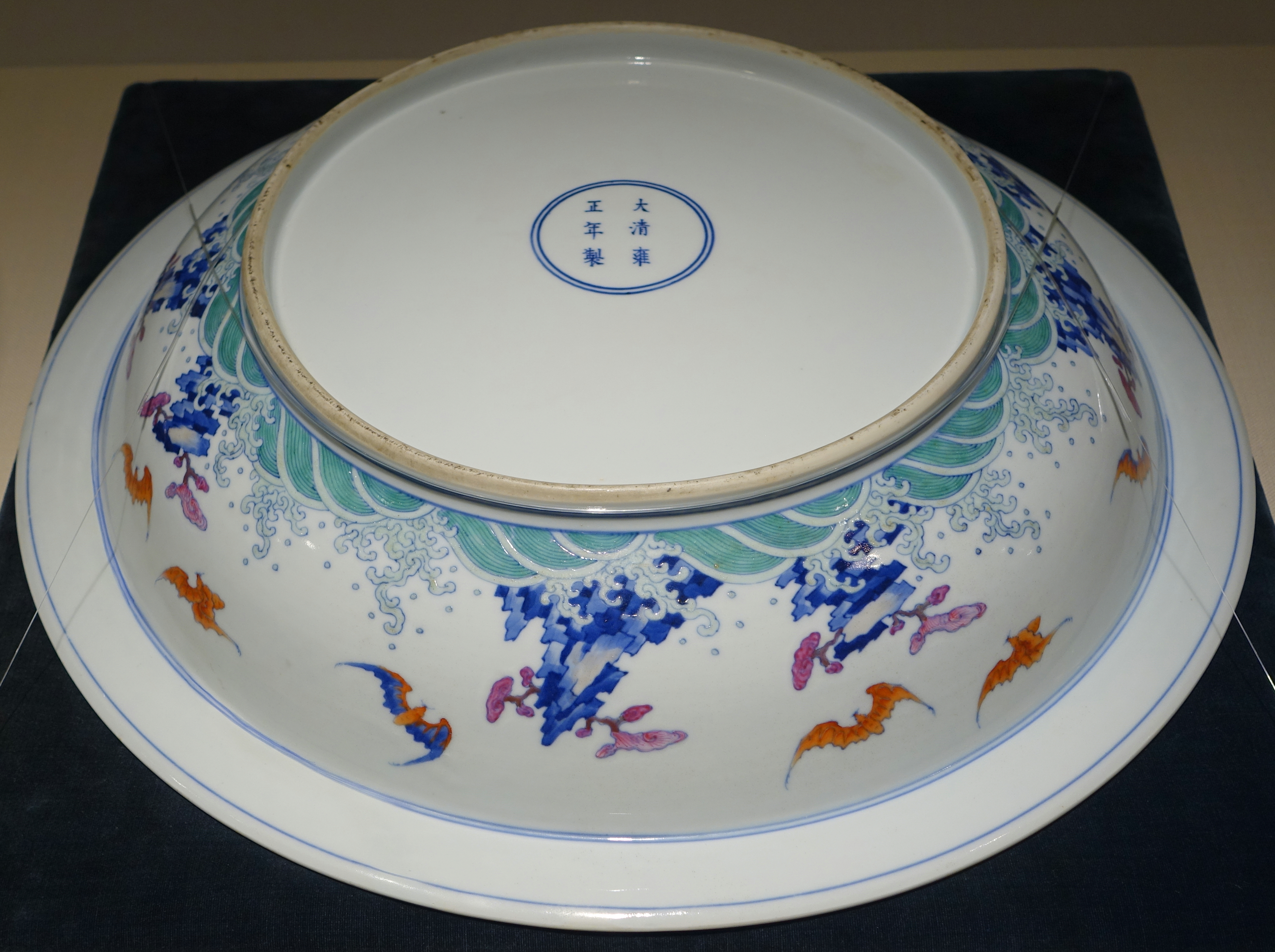
Underside of the last, Yongzheng period, 1723–1735

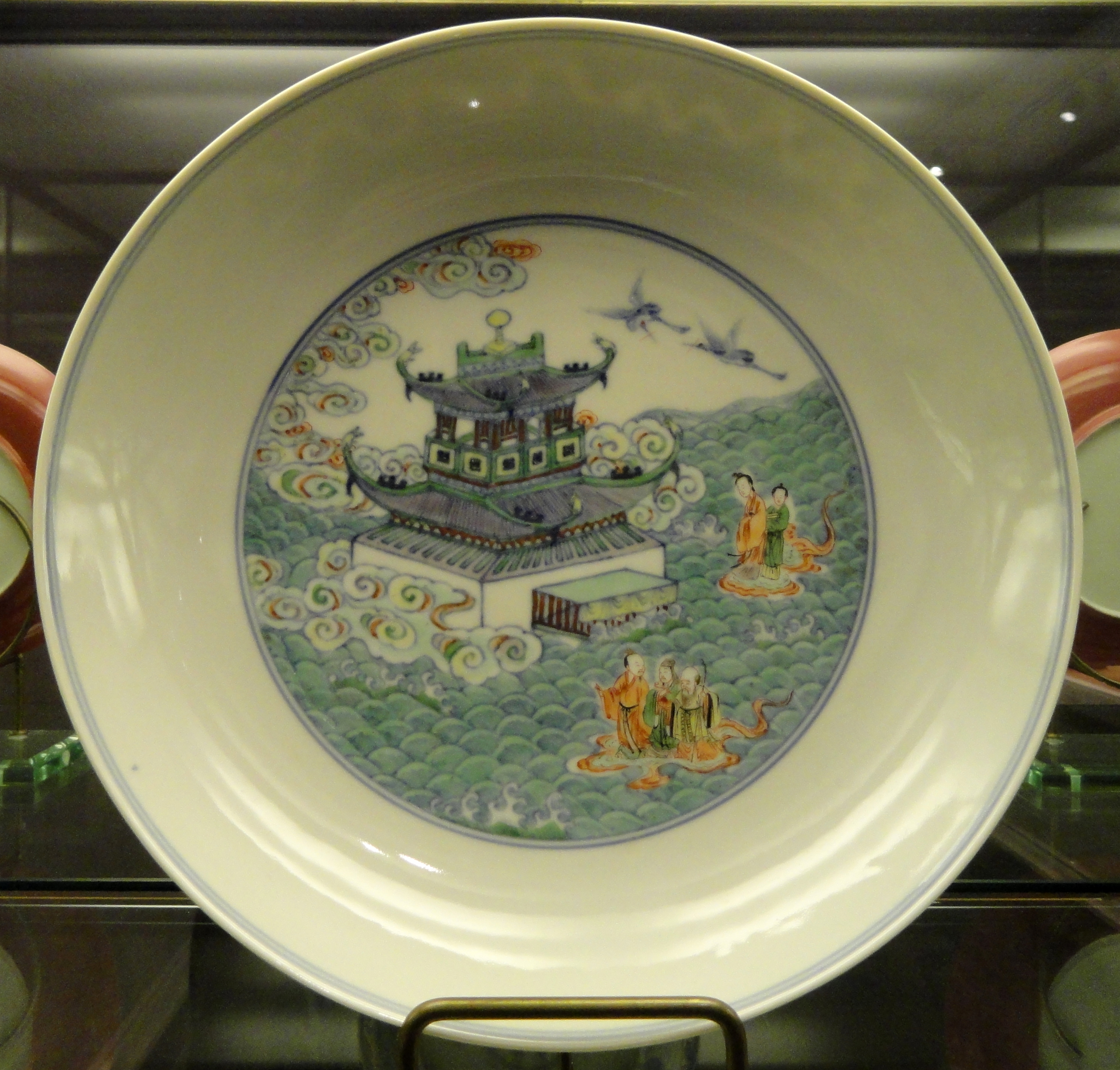
Dish, Yongzheng Reign, 1723–1735

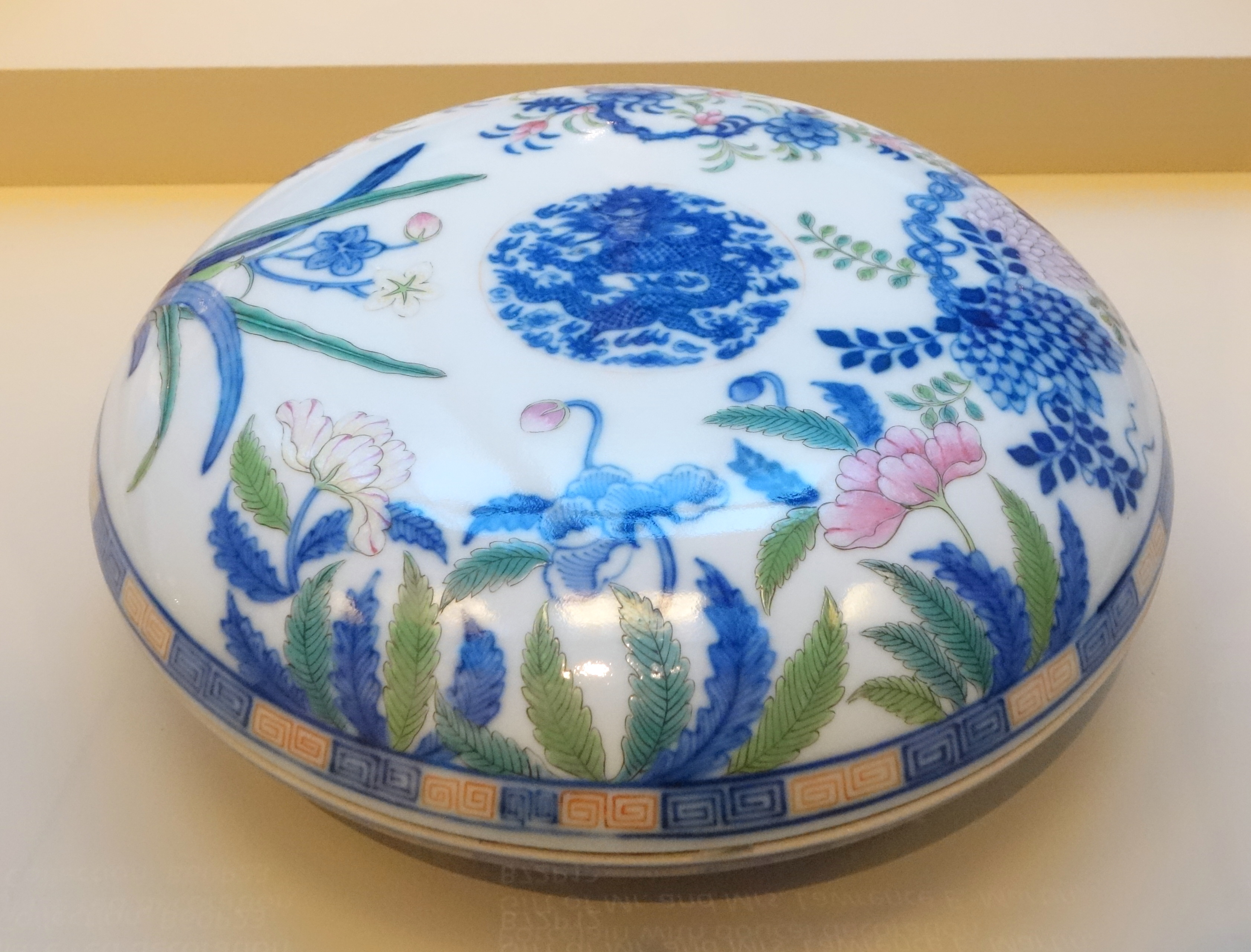
Covered box with flowers, Qianlong Emperor, 1735–1796

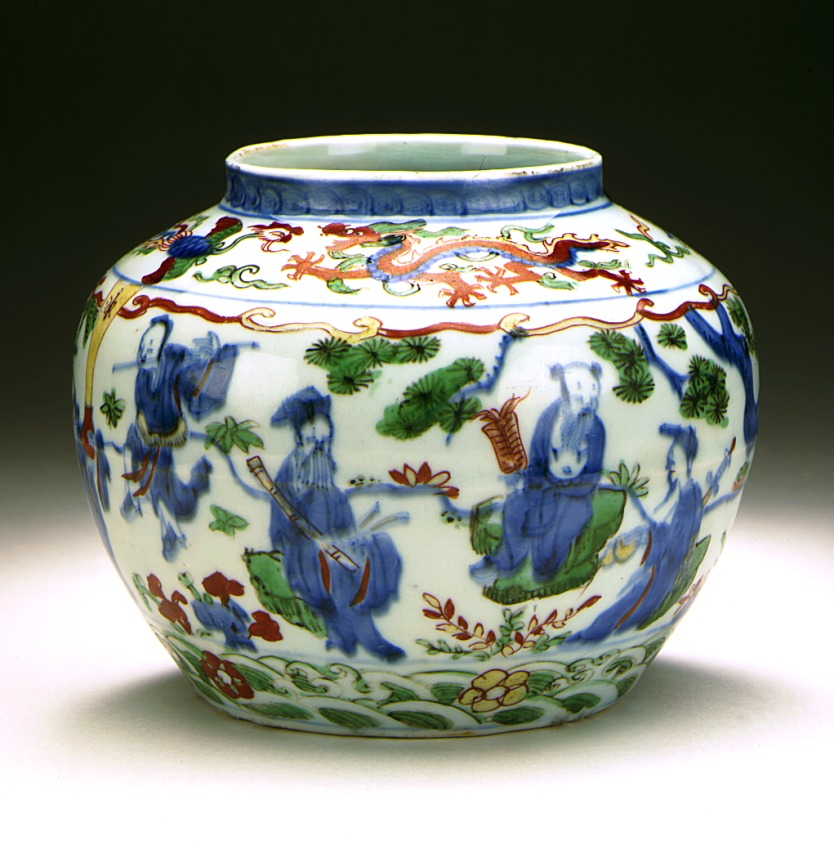
Wucai jar with the Eight Immortals, Wanli reign, 1573–1620
