= Chicken Cup (Chenghua) =

Chinese porcelain vessel

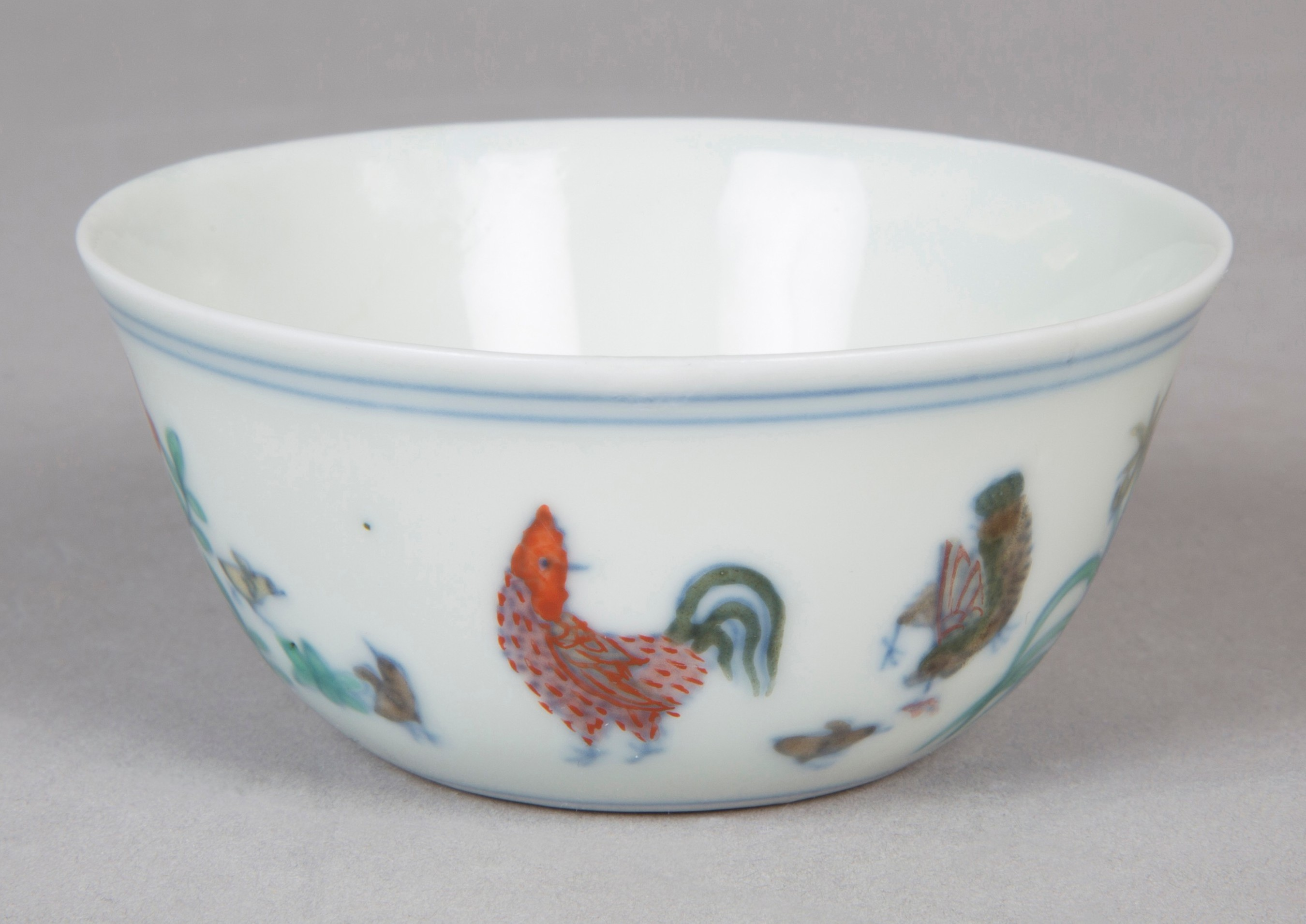
- Jingdezhen ware cup in the Metropolitan Museum of Art
- Material: Doucai porcelain with underglaze blue and overglaze coloured enamel
- Size: Height: 4.1 cm (1.6 in); Diameter of rim: 8.3 cm (3.3 in)
- Created: Chenghua period (1465–1487)
- Period/culture: Ming Dynasty
- Place: Jingdezhen, China

A Chicken Cup is a bowl-shaped vessel made of Chinese porcelain painted in the doucai technique. Chicken cups were created during the Ming dynasty (1368–1644), during the Chenghua Emperor's reign (1465–1487) in China, and originally functioned as a vessel to drink wine from. Chenghua Chicken Cups were created in an imperial kiln in the Jingdezhen porcelain factory, in Southern China. The Emperor Chenghua had the Chicken Cup created in the 15th century as an act of devotion for his empress mother who was recorded to have an appreciation for small objects and valued a simple design taste.

Chicken cups are decorated with chickens, hens and cocks. There are a rooster and a hen which feed their young chick, as they grub for worms and stretch out their wings. The chickens on the cup are interpreted as representing core dynastic Chinese values, such as continuing the family line and nurturing the young. There are currently thirteen authentic Chenghua cups held by museums and three cups owned privately. Chicken Cups from the Chenghua period do not have specific dates of production or identified artists recorded.

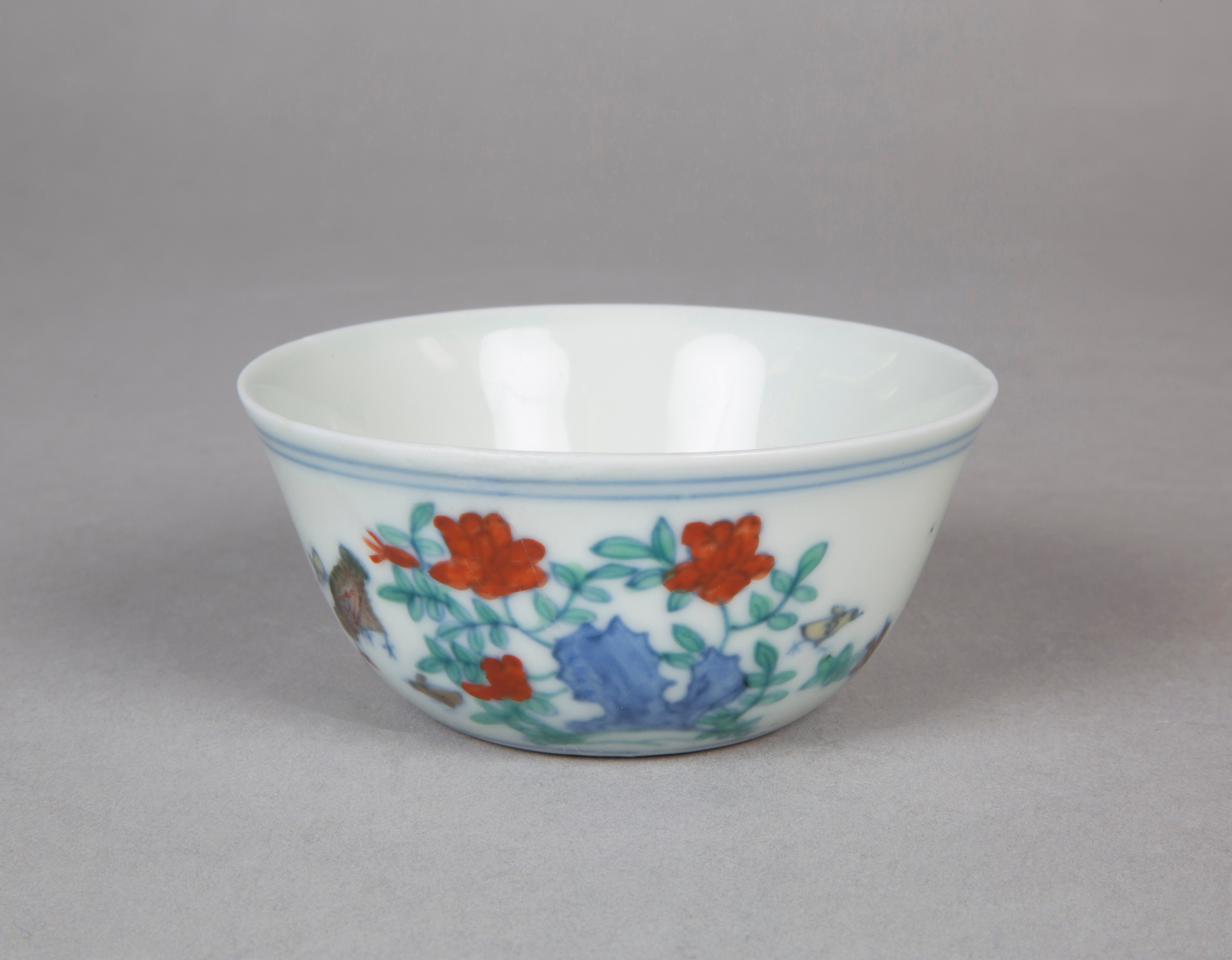
Flower scene on the exterior of the Metropolitan chicken cup with red peony bushes, yellow lilies and garden and lake rocks

== Cultural significance ==
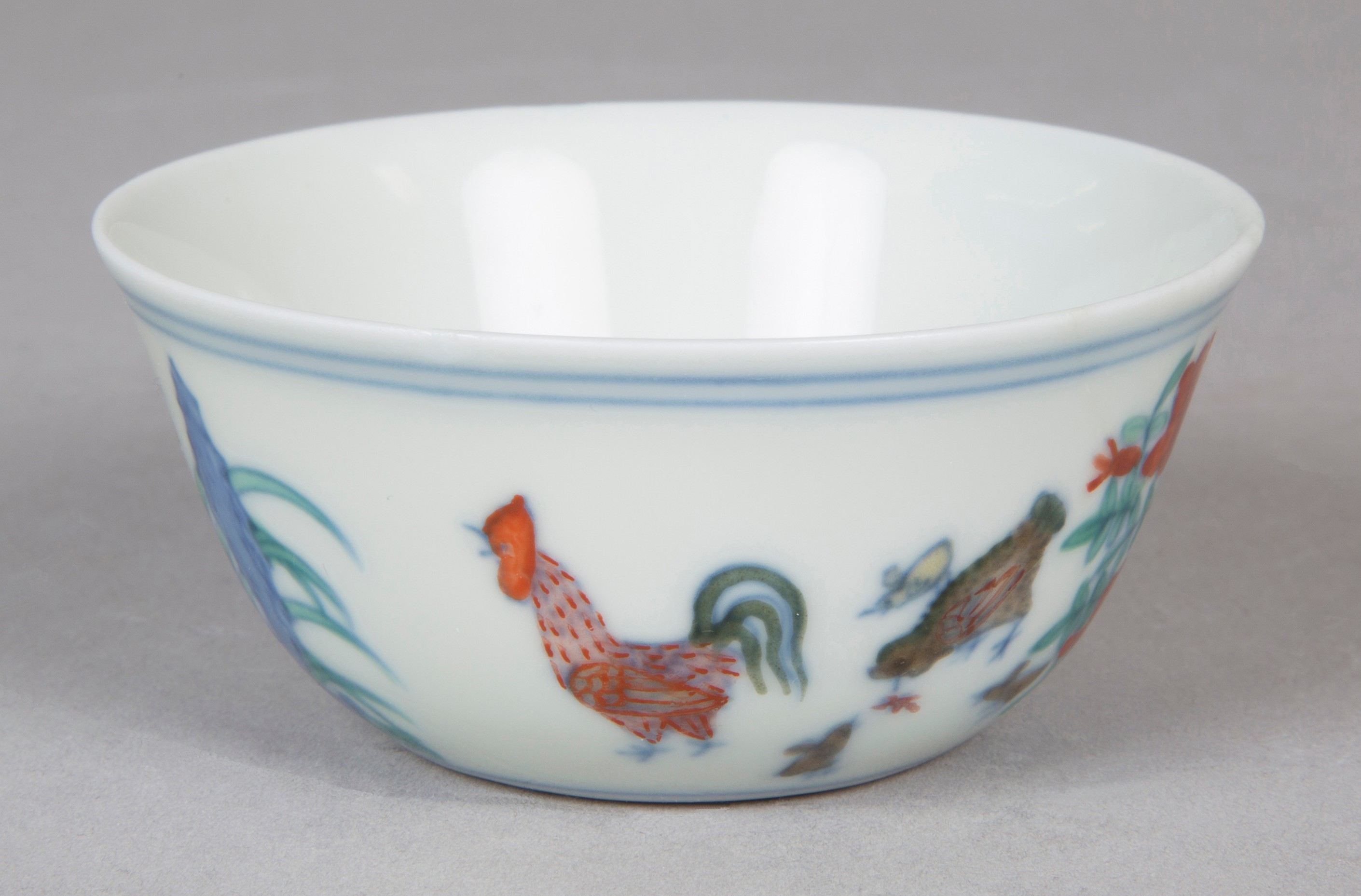
Another view, Metropolitan

During the Chenghua reign, the production of imperial wares had been influenced by the style of the previous reign during the Xuande period (1426–1435). Toward the end of the Xuande Emperor's reign, the imperial porcelain industry in Jingdezhen began to expand production quantities. The imperial factory in Jingdezhen was formally established during the Ming Dynasty in 1392, and was located in the Jiangxi province of China. The factory operated as the primary supplier of porcelain to the court, with pieces also reaching the elite class. Imperial porcelains were characterised by their use of motifs which were symbolic and hierarchical, as they were regulated by the court and thought to embody the refined achievements of predecessors within the field of pottery such as those of the early Qing. During the Ming Dynasty, imperial porcelains also featured an increased range of colours, palettes and designs which could be underglaze, overglaze or slip painted. Jingdezhen porcelains had also gained global significance, with large quantities of Chinese export porcelain being exported to Asia, Europe and even Africa between the 15th and 17th centuries.

The chicken cup was sought out after by Ming (1368–1644), Qing (1644–1911) emperors, especially the Kangxi Emperor (1662–1722), as well as other Chinese literati collectors and connoisseurs in China. The popularity of the chicken cup also increased during the reign of the Wanli Emperor (1572–1620) who admired the Chenghua ceramics and was reported to have had a rare Chenghua chicken cup stolen from his dining table. Several references within Chinese literature describe the fortunes allocated by nobles and emperors in order to obtain chicken cups in the 17th century.

=== Replicas ===
Many chicken cups were reproduced during the Qing dynasty, where replication techniques were complex and continued to advance throughout the 18th century. Imitations of chicken cups as well as other blue and white Jingdezhen wares were prominent in Southern Chinese kilns which were sold to the South-East Asian consumer market. These wares were called Swatow wares, a European name derived from what was (wrongly) thought to be the port for exportation. Chicken cups were also subject to corruption amongst officials within the Imperial palace where records of cups stolen from the kilns exist. The cups currently continue to be reproduced fraudulently for sale at antique markets in China where they are sold as replicas of the original Chenghua cups.

== Creation ==
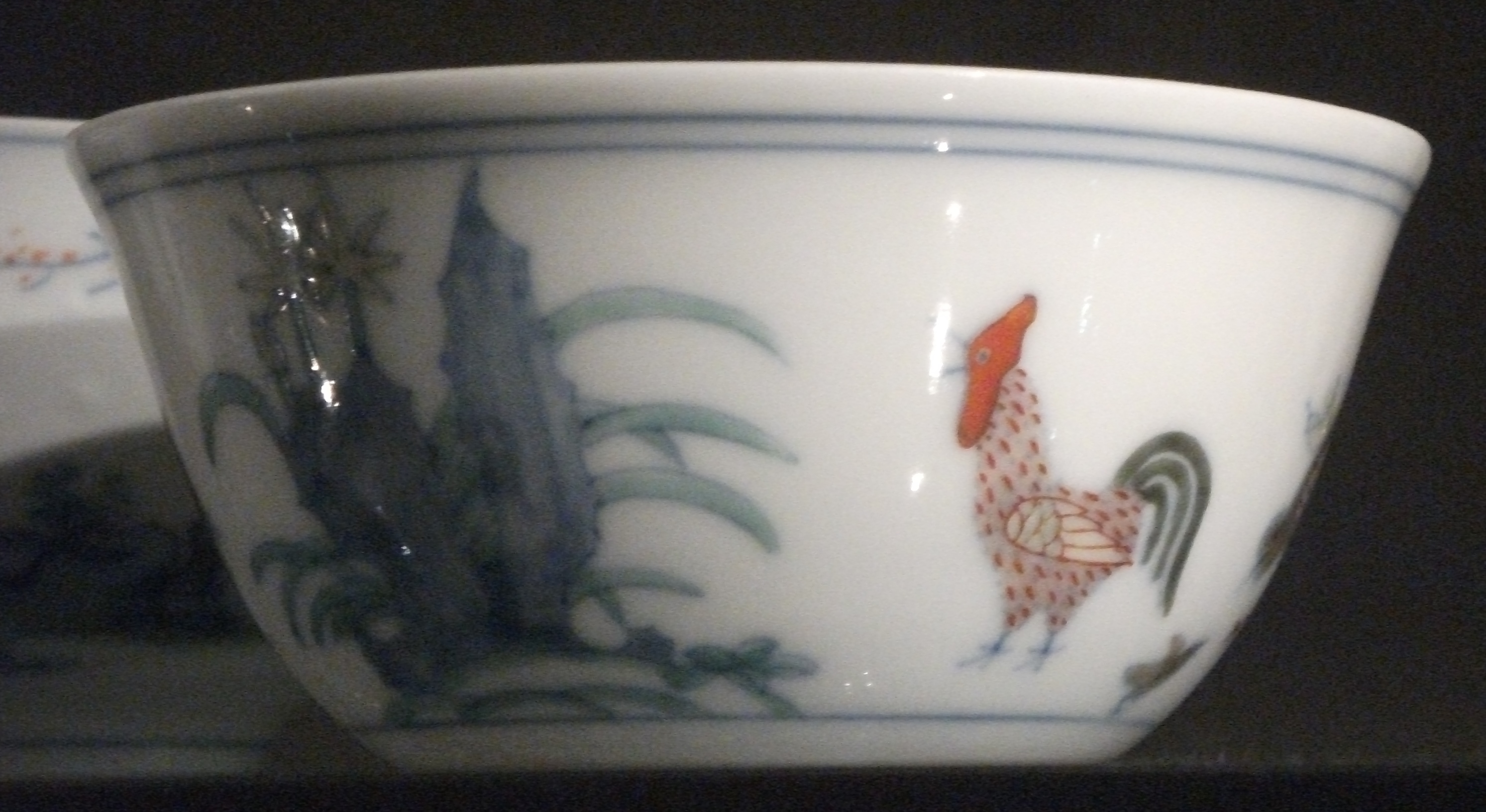
Example in the Percival David Collection, British Museum

Production of the chicken cup and other Jingdezhen porcelain during the Chenghua period involved a complicated process which was increasingly refined after the previous Xuande period. The design of the chicken cup was drawn onto the unfired cup using cobalt blue, before the vessel was glazed and fired at high temperatures. Glazing techniques involved increasing levels of aluminium oxide whilst reducing iron oxide. This allowed the porcelain to withstand higher temperatures when fired and resulted in a white, dense ceramic. The high temperatures also caused the content of iron and calcium oxide present in the glaze to become reduced, which led to the cup's characteristic clear and soft sheen.

The cocks, hens and chickens decorating the chicken cup were painted in a cobalt blue underglaze outline, before being filled in with enamel pigments. The softness of the underglaze blue was achieved through using natural Chinese cobalt, as imported cobalt such as the Persian blue or Sumatran blue used during the Qing dynasty to create deep, bright underglazes, were unavailable during the Chenghua period. The enamel pigments were applied and then fixed in a second low temperature firing . The complex design production process of the chicken cup also involved a production line manufacturing process, where separate divisions of labour each worked to produce the different motifs depicted on the ware. The cups are believed to have been created for the emperor Chenghua's mother, Empress Dowager Wang.

== Ownership ==
=== Collections ===
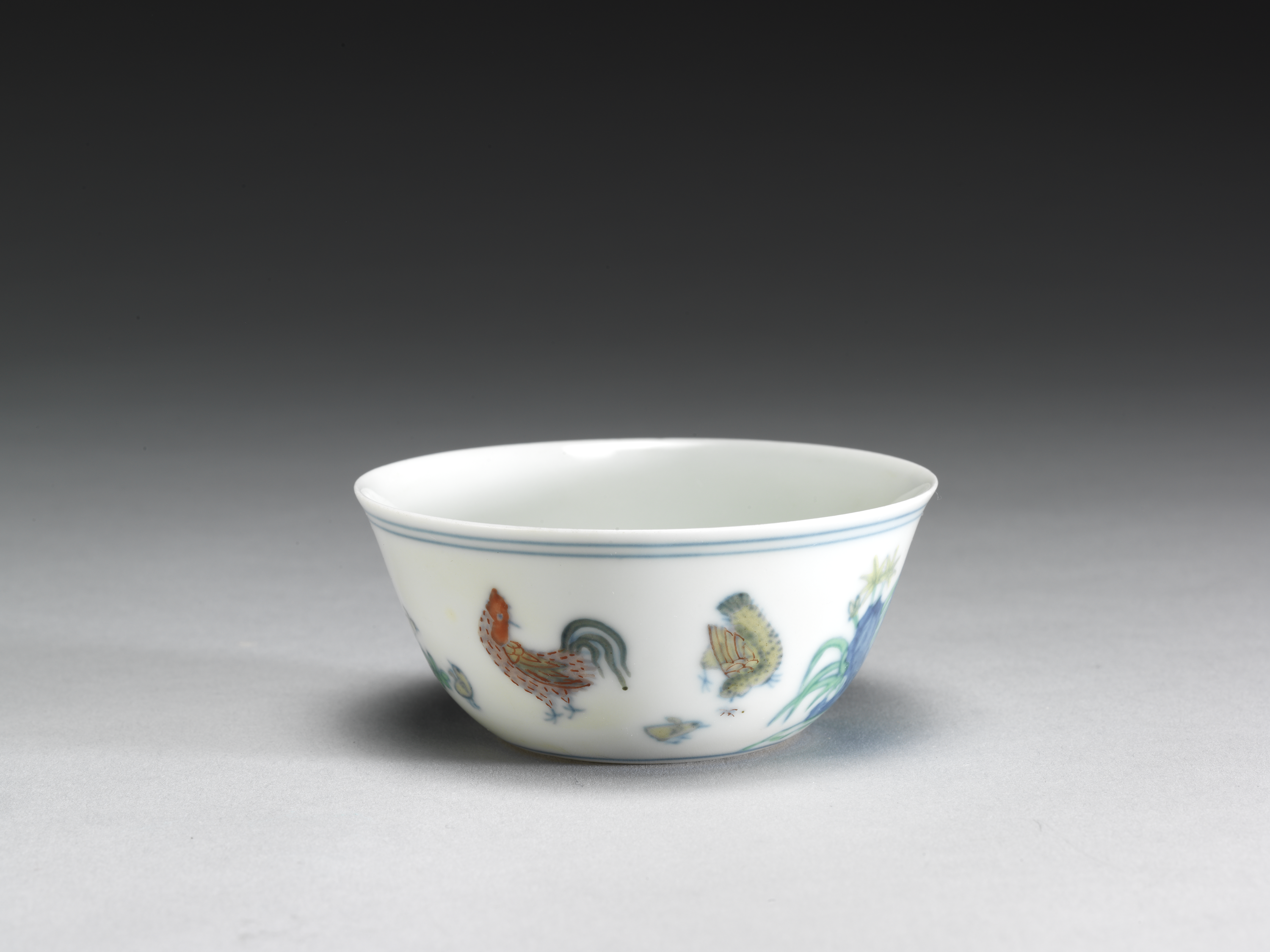
Cup in the National Palace Museum collection

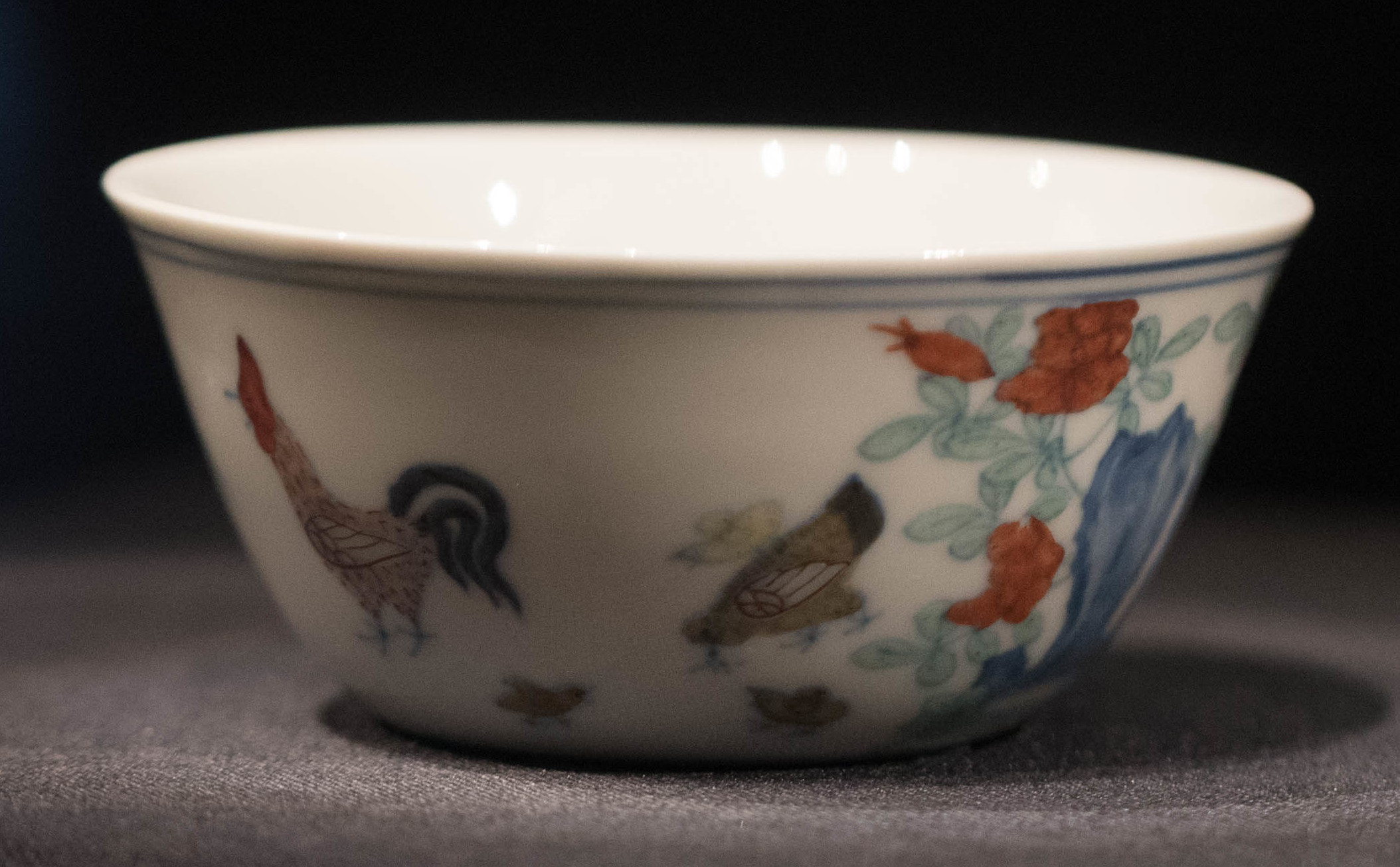
One of the disputed examples in Beijing

The National Palace Museum in Taipei currently holds eight authentic chicken cup ceramics from the Chenghua period. There are five museum collections which also hold Chenghua Chicken cups; in the British Museum (at least two) and Victoria and Albert Museum in London, the Fitzwilliam Museum, Cambridge, the Metropolitan Museum of Art, New York City, and the Collections Baur, Geneva. Three other Chenghua chicken cups are recorded as being owned privately. Two cups in the Palace Museum Beijing, claimed as Chenghua by the museum, are disputed by Western experts.

=== Sotheby's auctions ===
Chenghua chicken cups have recently only been offered for sale at auctions conducted by the international auction house, Sotheby's. On August 8, 2014, Sotheby's conducted a seven-sale series of Chinese ceramics in Hong Kong. A Chenghua chicken cup from the private Meiyintang collection of Chinese ceramics was sold at the auction for a record US$36.05 million (HK $281.24 million) to Shanghainese billionaire Liu Yiqian. This was recorded as the highest auction price for any Chinese Porcelain to be sold at. The previous record for was held by a Qing Dynasty vase which sold for US$32.4 million in 2010. The estimated pre-sale price for the Chicken Cup was recorded at US$38.6 million in 2010. The chicken cup was previously sold in 1980 in Hong Kong for US$1.08 million (HK $5.28 million), as well as in 1999, where it also established a record price for Chinese porcelain at US$3.70 million (HK $29.17 million).

This Chenghua cup was previously part of the Meiyintang Collection owned by Switzerland's Zuellig family, including industrialist Stephen Zuellig and his brother Gilbert. The brothers owned the Meiyintang collection for over half of a century. The Meiyintang collection was made up of 2,000 Chinese ceramics from the Neolithic to the late imperial periods and was one of the best European collections of Chinese imperial porcelain. The collection was assembled over a period of greater than 50 years. The cup was also previously owned by collectors such as Leopold Dreyfus, Sakamoto Goro, Giuseppe Eskenazi and Edward Chow.

The record auction price of the singular chicken cup is attributed to scarcity within the market for rare Chinese ceramics, as well as the increased demand within the market for ancient Chinese porcelains as China's economy expanded in 2014. Several of the cups were originally displayed in the Jingdezhen museum alongside large quantities of other Chenghua ceramics. The intervention of collecting over time leading to the cup's status of singularity has enabled the Chicken Cup to become a scarce commodity. The cup is one of nineteen which continues to exist, and is the only to remain in a private Chinese collection.

Purchasing the chicken cup was recorded to involve Liu Yiqian performing twenty-four swipes of an Amex card, due to Sotheby's credit card transaction limit of $US1.6 million. While the payment process proceeded at the Hong Kong auction house, Liu was photographed pouring tea into the cup and sipping from it. This event resulted in criticism from communities within China, with some suggesting the action was disrespectful and created risk of damage to the cup.

== Iconography and interpretations ==
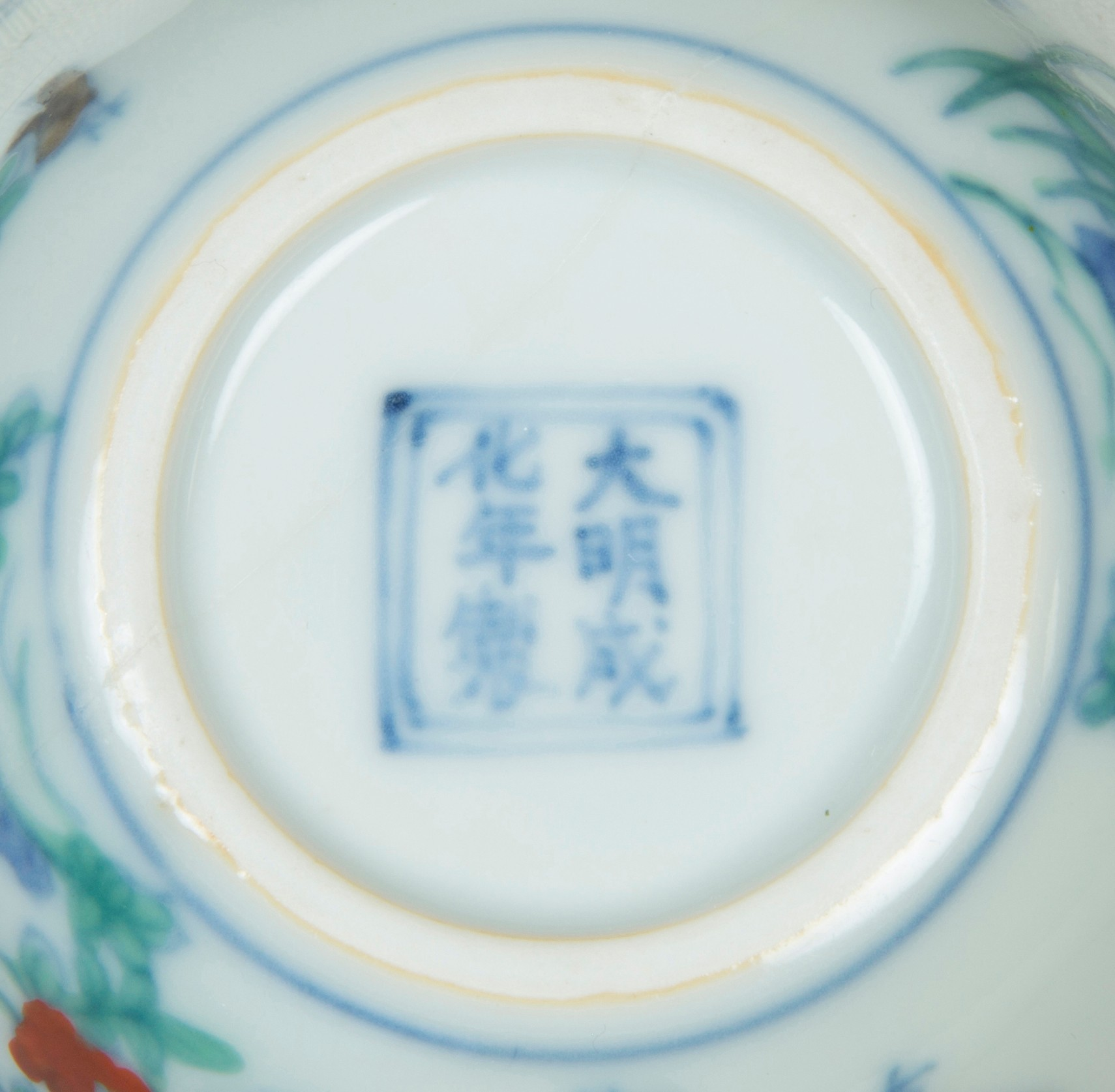
Six-character Chenghua mark on bottom of Chicken Cup painted in blue and white glaze

=== Style ===
The decorations are painted in the doucai painting style of the Ming Dynasty, which translates to 'contending' or 'contrasting colours'. The cup is classified as a wucai ware, meaning the cup features five colours. The cup is decorated in softly toned underglaze blue washes and features contrasting overglazes and outline elements in green, iron red, yellow, turquoise and pale aubergine coloured enamels which are bright and transparent. The cup also features two separate scenes of decoration which are divided by jagged rocks and yellow lilies with green leaves.

=== Symbols ===
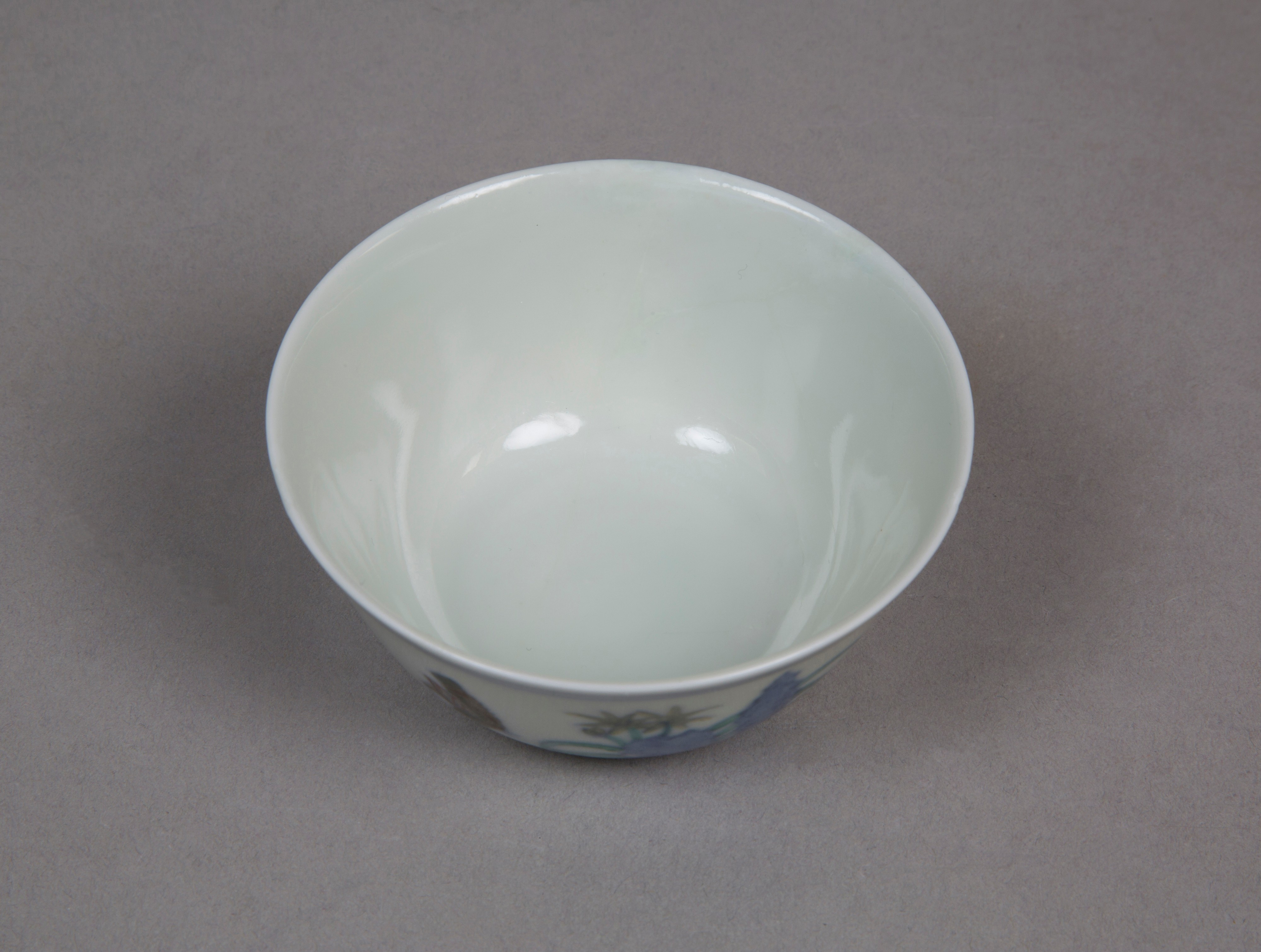
Interior of the Chicken Cup

The first scene on the exterior of the cup is an outdoor scene, which features a subject matter of two sets of cockerel, his hen, and their chicks grubbing in the dirt. The painting depicts the rooster and the hen to be taking care of the young chick. The polychrome depiction of chickens which decorate the cup is interpreted as a dynastic symbol and a parable for Chinese Confucian beliefs. The scene is described to represent the role of the emperor nurturing and taking care of his subjects, as well as the continuation of the familial line. The motif of the rooster and hen with young chicks is also recorded to symbolise the pleasures of simple life and the belief of luck within the familial line. The depiction of a hen symbolises the values of fertility, nurturing and earth. The symbol of chickens since the Eastern Han dynasty has represented five merits, including literary, martial, bravery, benevolence and honesty. Other qualities which have also traditionally been associated with the rooster in Ancient Chinese art include ferocity, courage and faithfulness. These qualities were believed to embody the emperor, who was perceived as the benevolent protector of his people within the Confucian world.

The second scene of the cup is a floral scene of a rose bush beside garden and lake rocks. The cup is decorated with two sets of flower and stone motifs, including paintings of red Peonies and yellow Lilies. These flower symbols are interpreted to reflect core Chinese values, as red peonies symbolise wealth and honour. The yellow lilies which are placed aside stones are interpreted to symbolise longevity.

=== Composition ===
The cup's structure includes a flared mouth, sides with shallow curvature, an everted rim and a recessed, ringed base. The cup also features a lip with a very slightly grainy texture which was theorised to occur as a result of the manufacturing process. Although the cups differ in size, they are recognised for their miniature structure, with the Doucai cup located at the Metropolitan Museum of art measuring approximately 4.1 cm in height, 8.3 cm in diameter and 3.7 cm diameter of base. The inside of the cup is white and does not have any painting design. The inside also features a distinctive Chenghua mark. This is a six-character mark which is decoded to inform the reader of the cup's creation during the Ming Dynasty within the Chenghua reign. This is painted in a blue and white glaze and is structured within a double-lined rectangular frame, which is also repeated through the double line border at the base and at the lip of the cup. The material of the Doucai porcelain is recorded as tactile, soft and thin.
