= Gianni Mattioli =

Italian art collector

- Born: 1903; Milan, Italy
- Died: 1977 (aged 73–74); Milan, Italy
- Occupation: Cotton trader
- Known for: Art collection
- Children: Laura Mattioli

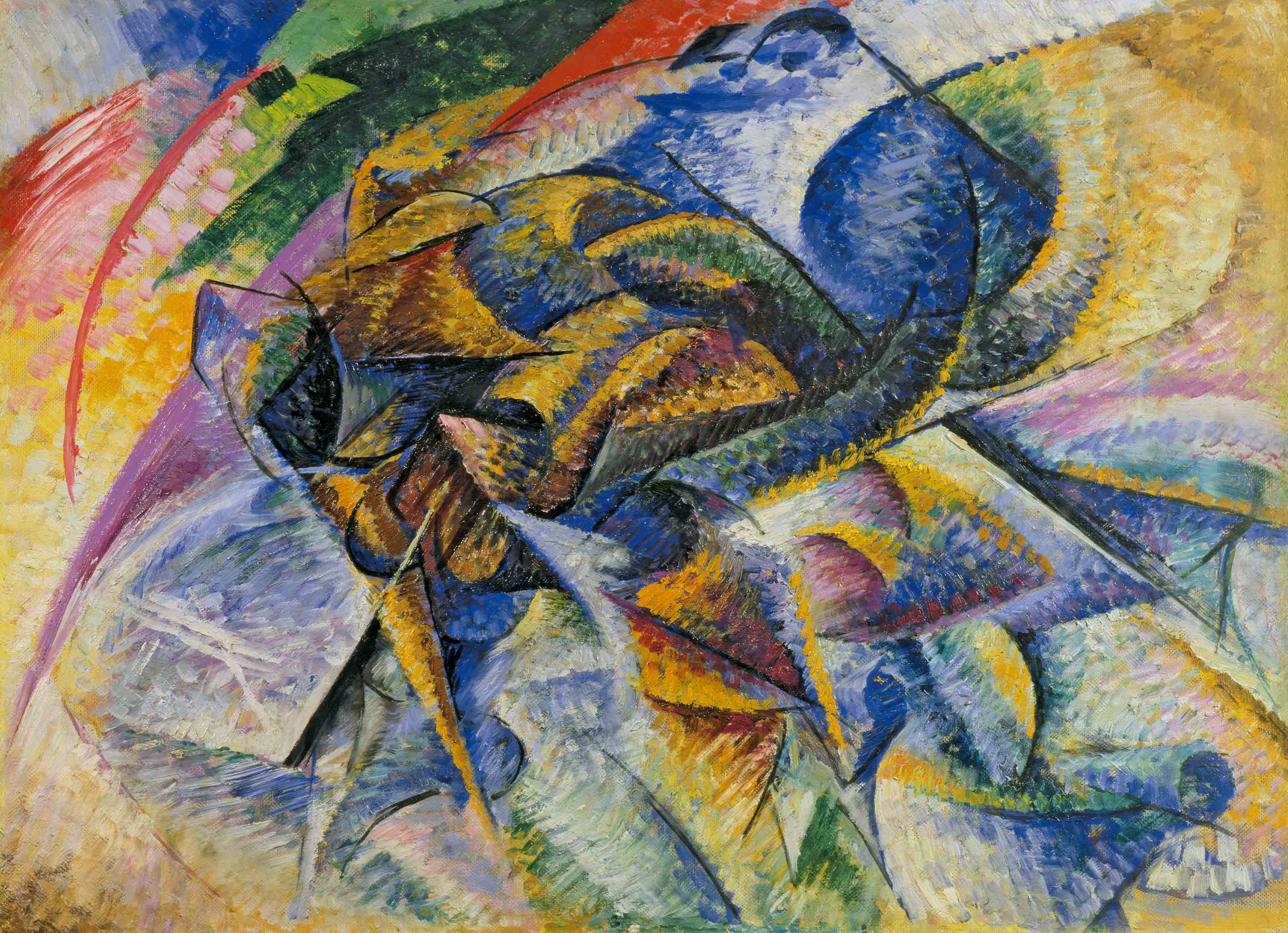
Dynamism of a Cyclist, Umberto Boccioni, 1913. Gianni Mattioli Collection, on long-term loan to the Peggy Guggenheim Collection, Venice.

Gianni Mattioli (1903 – 1977) was an Italian businessman, a cotton trader in Milan, and an art collector, particularly of the work of the Italian Futurists.

Mattioli was born in Milan in 1903, and started collecting in the early 1920s, but most of his collection was built in the late 1930s and 1940s, and in 1949, he acquired 87 works from fellow Italian collector Pietro Feroldi (1881–1958).

Mattioli died in Milan in 1977, and his daughter the art historian, Laura Mattioli Rossi, inherited the collection.

26 works from the Gianni Mattioli Collection were on loan to the Peggy Guggenheim Collection in Venice from 1997 to 2015.

In November 2015, Nu couché a 1917 Amedeo Modigliani oil on canvas from the collection, was sold by his daughter at Christie's, New York for $170.4 million to Liu Yiqian.
