= Eagle Standing on Pine Tree =

1946 painting by Qi Baishi

- 松鹰图 (Chinese)
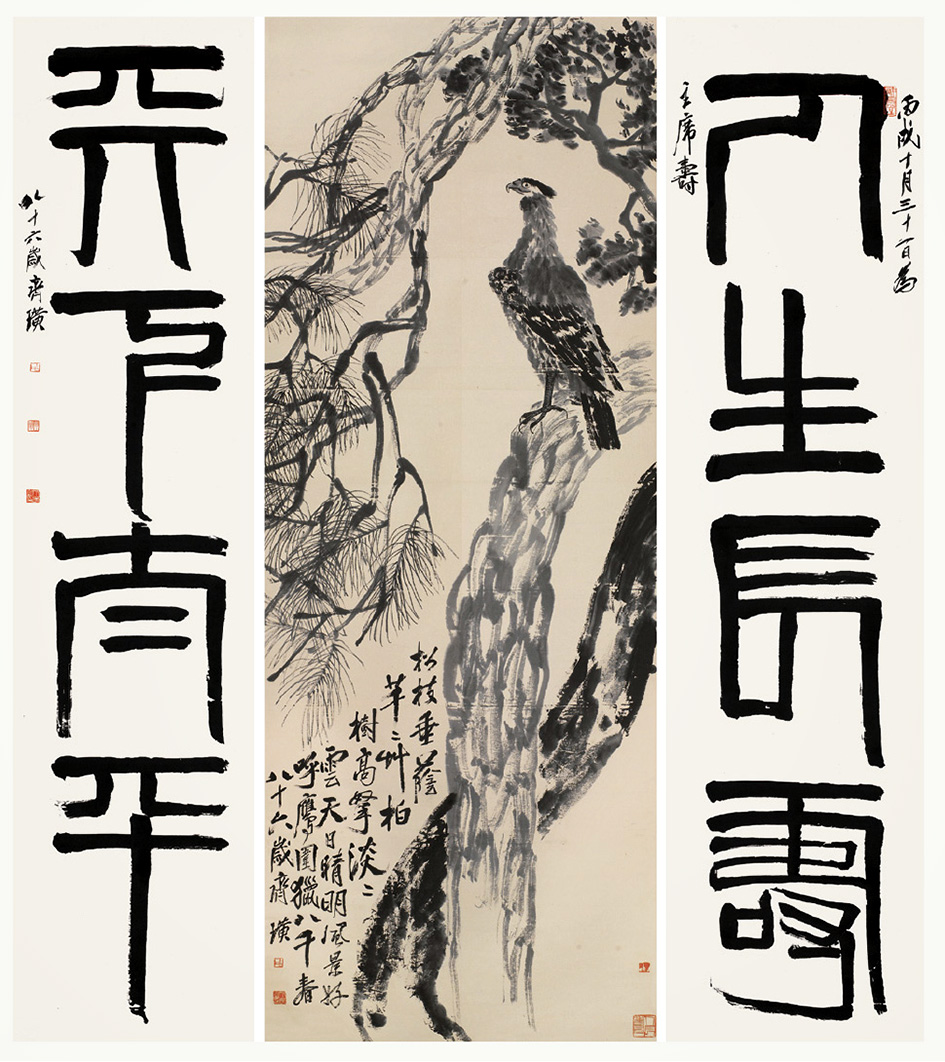
- Artist: Qi Baishi
- Year: 1946
- Medium: Ink on Xuan paper
- Movement: Modern Chinese
- Dimensions: 266 cm × 100 cm (104.7 in (Note: Sizes are applicable to the painting itself. The calligraphy scrolls surrounding it measure 264.5 cm × 65.8 cm (104.1 in × 25.9 in)) × 39.3 in (Note: Sizes are applicable to the painting itself. The calligraphy scrolls surrounding it measure 264.5 cm × 65.8 cm (104.1 in × 25.9 in)))
- Location: Unknown

Eagle Standing on Pine Tree (Chinese: 松鹰图) (Note: Also known as Eagle Standing on Pine Tree with Four-Character Couplet in Seal Script (Chinese: 松鹰图 篆书四言联). In China, the painting is often referred to as Pine and Cypress Standing Tall, Pine and Cypress, Towering Pine and Cypress or A Long Life, a Peaceful World.) is a 1946 ink on Xuan paper painting by Qi Baishi. The central component of the piece depicts a pine tree and a cypress tree intertwined behind an eagle and a self-written poem, while calligraphy scrolls surrounding it display a couplet written in seal script.

== Description ==
The painting itself is 266 cm × 100 cm, while the calligraphy scrolls on either side are 264.5 cm × 65.8 cm, making it Qi Baishi's largest creation. Both the painting and the scrolls are marked by seal carvings. The painting depicts a pine tree and cypress tree interwined, with a large eagle standing on the trunk of the pine tree. The bottom left corner of the artwork shows a poem written by Qi – "Pine branches droop, casting shade on lush grass; Cypress trees stand tall, reaching for the pale clouds. The sky is clear and the scenery is beautiful; Eagles call to hunt, marking eight thousand springs."

The painting is surrounded by a couplet in large seal script on both sides, reading "May people live long and prosper, and may the world be at peace". The upper line of the couplet is inscribed with the sentence "Bingcheng celebrates the Chairman's birthday on the 31st of October", while the lower line was signed by Qi and reads "Qi Huang, eighty-six years old."

== History ==
Qi painted Eagle Standing on Pine Tree in 1946 as a 60th birthday gift to Chiang Kai-shek, who led the Republic of China from 1928 to 1975. The painting was later part of a private collection in San Francisco before being sold to billionaire art collector Liu Yiqian in 2005 for around US$600,000, under the name Pine and Cypress Standing Tall. In 2010, Liu purchased the calligraphy scrolls – Four-Character Couplet in Seal Script – for US$2.21 million. The following year, he sold the painting and scrolls as one artwork referred to as Eagle Standing on Pine Tree (Note: The auction guide listed the full title of the combined piece as Pine and Cypress Standing Tall with Four-Character Couplet in Seal Script, but the name Eagle Standing on Pine Tree is more commonly used.) at auction.

=== Sale in 2011 ===
On May 22, 2011, Eagle Standing on Pine Tree was sold through the auction house China Guardian for US$65.5 million. At the time, it marked the highest price ever paid for one of Qi's works, and the second highest amount paid for a piece of art at auction in Mainland China. The buyer was named as Hunan TV & Broadcast Intermediary Corporation, an affiliate and former subsidiary of Hunan Broadcasting System, who own other pieces by Qi. It was later revealed that the company had raised doubts about the painting's authenticity and refused to pay.
