= Giorgio Morandi =

Italian painter (1890–1964)

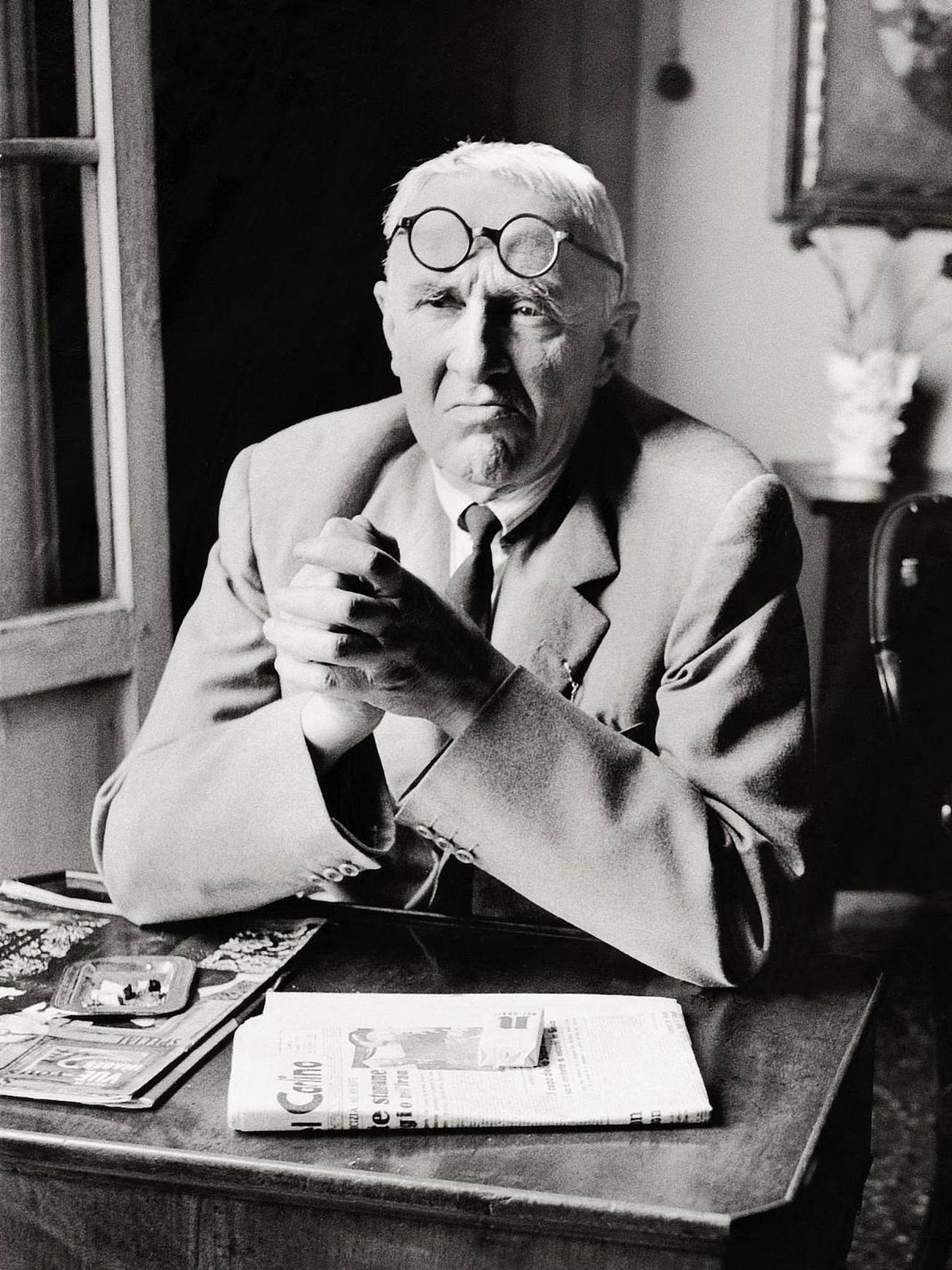
- Born: July 20, 1890; Bologna, Kingdom of Italy
- Died: June 18, 1964 (aged 73); Bologna, Italy
- Education: Accademia di Belle Arti, Bologna
- Known for: Painting; printmaking
- Movement: Metaphysical art; Futurism; modern Realism

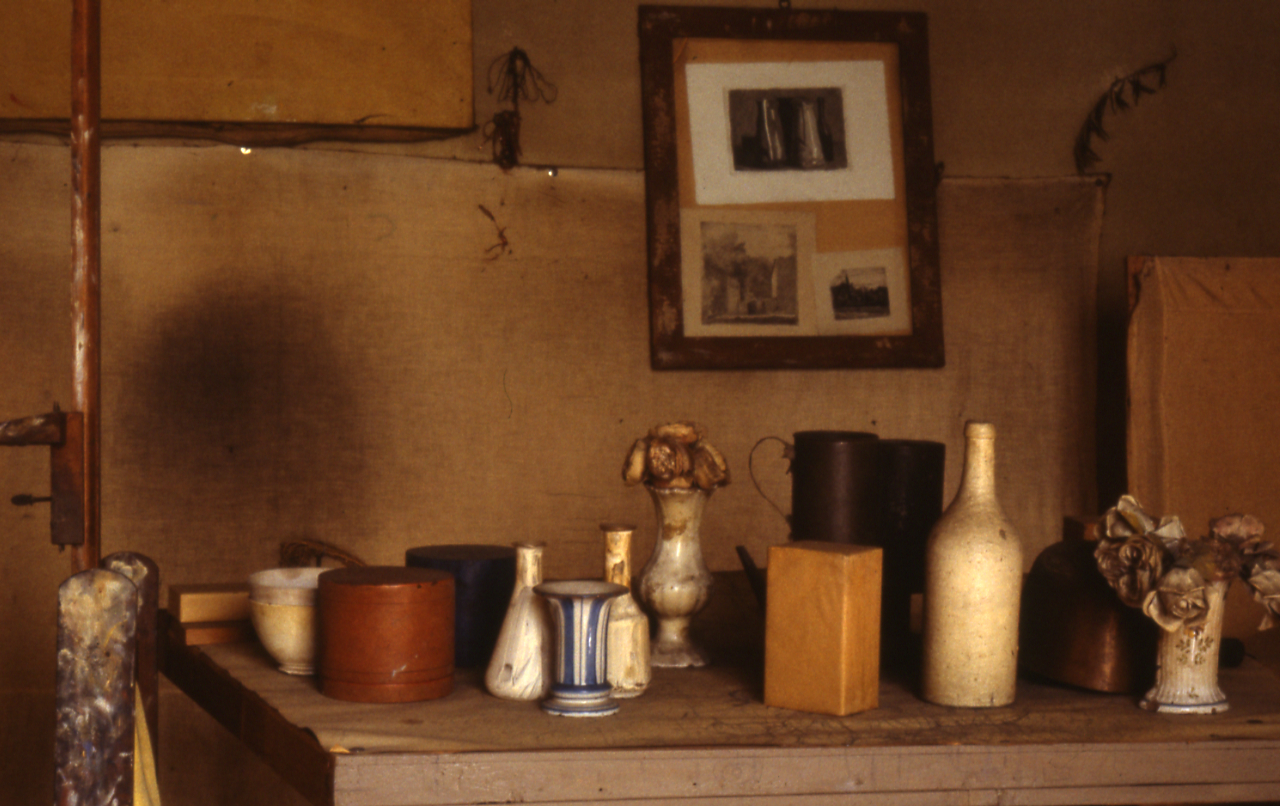
Morandi's studio in Via Fondazza, Bologna

Giorgio Morandi (July 20, 1890 – June 18, 1964) was an Italian painter and printmaker widely known for his subtly muted still-life paintings of ceramic vessels, flowers, and landscapes.

== Biography ==
Morandi was born in Bologna, Italy, to Andrea Morandi and Maria Maccaferri, eldest of the family of five sons and three daughters. He lived first on Via Lame where his brother Giuseppe and his sister Anna were born. The family then moved to Via Avesella, where two other sisters were born, Dina in 1900 and Maria Teresa in 1906. After the death of his father in 1909, the family moved to Via Fondazza, and Giorgio became the head of the family.

From 1907 to 1913, he studied at the Accademia di Belle Arti di Bologna ('Academy of Fine Arts of Bologna'). At the Accademia, which based its traditions on 14th-century painting, Morandi taught himself to etch by studying books on Rembrandt. He was excellent at his studies, although his professors disapproved of the changes in his style during his final two years at the Accademia.

In 1910, he visited Florence, where the works of artists such as Giotto, Masaccio, Piero della Francesca, and Paolo Uccello made a profound impression on him. He had a brief digression into a Futurist style in 1914. In that same year, Morandi was appointed instructor of drawing for elementary schools in Bologna—a post he held until 1929. Morandi was influenced by the works of Cézanne, Derain, and Picasso.

In 1915, he joined the army, had a breakdown and was discharged. During World War I, Morandi's still life paintings became more reduced in their compositional elements and more pure in form, reflecting an admiration for both Cézanne and Henri Rousseau.

Morandi practiced metaphysical painting (Italian: pittura metafisica) from 1918 to 1922. This was his last major stylistic shift; thereafter, he focused increasingly on subtle gradations of hue, tone, and objects arranged in a unifying atmospheric haze, establishing the direction his art was to take for the rest of his life. Morandi showed in the Novecento Italiano exhibitions of 1926 and 1929, but was more specifically associated with the regional Strapaese group by the end of the decade, a fascist-influenced group emphasizing local cultural traditions. He was sympathetic to the Fascist party in the 1920s, although his friendships with anti-Fascist figures led authorities to arrest him briefly in 1943.

From 1928, Morandi exhibited his work in Italy and abroad. He participated in some of the Venice Biennale exhibitions—where, in 1948, he won first prize for painting—and in the Rome Quadriennale, in 1931 and 1935. In 1929, he illustrated the work Il sole a picco by Vincenzo Cardarelli, winner of the Premio Bagutta. From 1930 to 1956, Morandi was a professor of etching at Accademia di Belle Arti. He visited Paris for the first time in 1956, and in 1957 he won the grand prize at the São Paulo Art Biennial.

Morandi died of lung cancer on June 18, 1964 at age 73. He is buried in the Certosa di Bologna in the family tomb, together with his three sisters. On the tomb is a portrait of him by Giacomo Manzù.

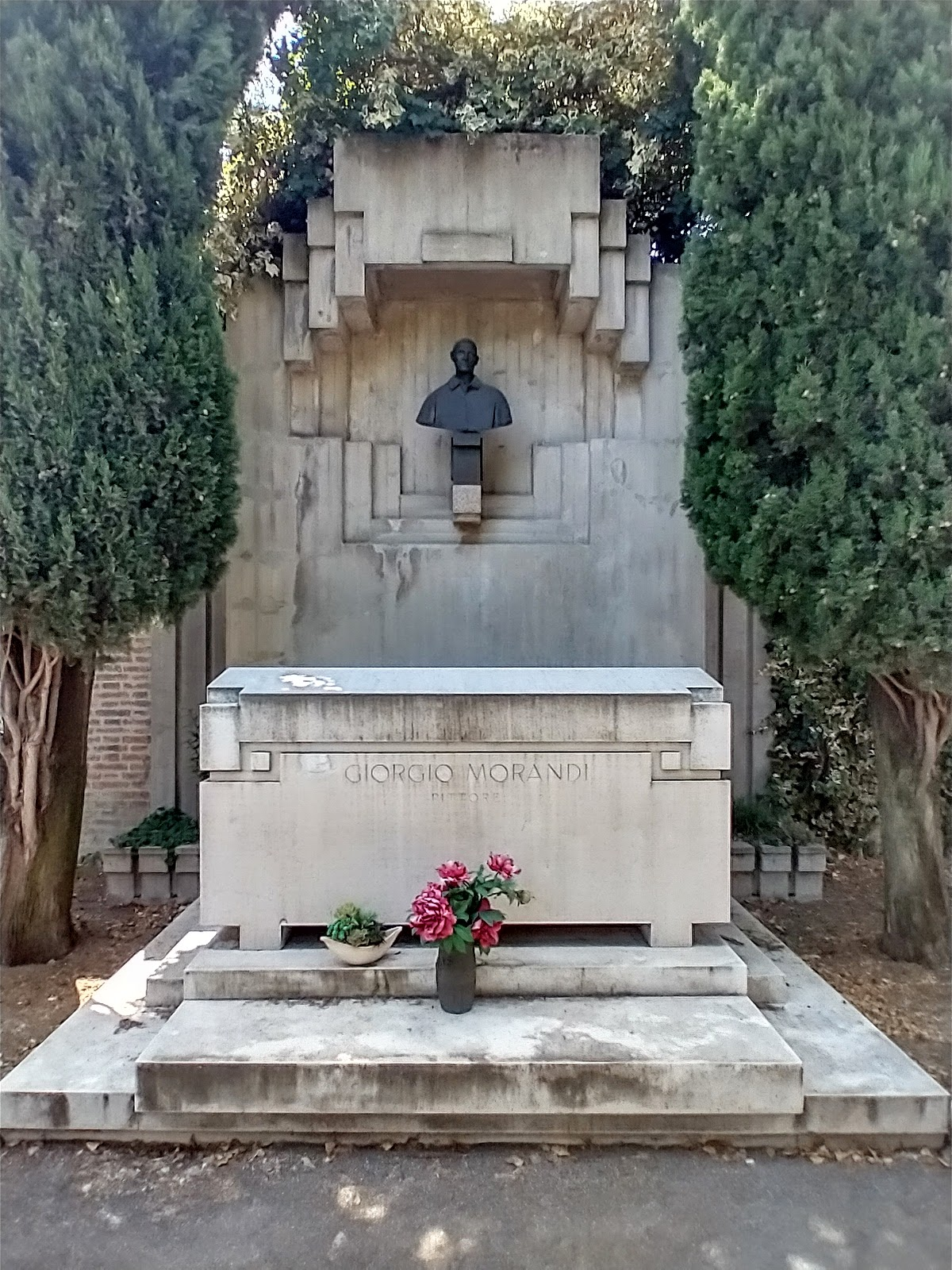
Morandi's tomb in the Certosa di Bologna

== Legacy ==
Throughout his career, Morandi concentrated almost exclusively on still lifes and landscapes, except for a few self-portraits. With great sensitivity to tone, colour, and compositional balance, he would depict the same familiar bottles and vases again and again in paintings notable for their simplicity of execution. A prolific painter, he completed some 1,350 oil paintings. He also executed 133 etchings, which constitute a significant body of work in their own right, and drawings and watercolours which approach abstraction in their economy of means. He explained: "I believe that my temperament, my nature inclined towards contemplation, has led me to these results [...] Expressing what is in nature, that is, in the visible world, is what most interests me."

Morandi was perceived as one of the few Italian artists of his generation to have escaped the taint of fascism and to have evolved a style of pure pictorial values congenial to modernist abstraction. Through his simple and repetitive motifs and economical use of colour, value, and surface, Morandi became a prescient and important forerunner of minimalism. Artists who have cited Morandi's work as an influence include Philip Guston, Vija Celmins, Wayne Thiebaud, Edmund de Waal, Joseph Cornell, Louise Nevelson, and Stanley Whitney, as well as architect Frank Gehry.

Morandi and his work have been reviewed and critiqued by authors including Philippe Jaccottet, Jean Leymarie, Jean Clair, Yves Bonnefoy, Roberto Longhi, Francesco Arcangeli, Cesare Brandi, Lamberto Vitali, Luigi Magnani, Marilena Pasquali, and many other critics.

=== In popular culture ===
Federico Fellini paid tribute to Morandi in his 1960 film La dolce vita, which featured Morandi's paintings, as does the film La Notte by Michelangelo Antonioni. One of the main characters in Sarah Hall's novel How to Paint a Dead Man is loosely based on Morandi. Don DeLillo's novel Falling Man notes two Morandi paintings on the wall of a character's New York apartment, and makes mention of "a show of Morandi paintings at a gallery in Chelsea". Morandi was a particular favorite of the eccentric Scottish poet Ivor Cutler, who included a poem about the painter in his first anthology Many Flies Have Feathers (1973).

=== As a subject of photography ===
Some of the most famous photographers of the twentieth century photographed Morandi at his house on Via Fondazza, at Morandi's Grizzana house, and at the Venice Biennale. Among those who photographed Morandi or his studio were Herbert List, Duane Michals, Jean Francois Bauret, Paolo Prandi, Paolo Ferrari, Lamberto Vitali, Libero Grandi, Franz Hubmann, Leo Lionni, Antonio Masotti, Carlo Ludovico Ragghianti, Lee Miller, Giancolombo, Ugo Mulas, Luigi Ghirri, Gianni Berengo Gardin, and Luciano Calzolari. The filmmaker Tacita Dean also filmed the inside of Morandi's house on Via Fondazza. An exhibition of stills from one of the two films, Still Life, was held at the Center for Italian Modern Art, New York, in 2016.

In 2016, the American photographer Joel Meyerowitz published Morandi's Objects, a book with photographs of more than 260 objects that the painter had collected during his life.

=== Museum collections ===
The largest public collection of Morandi's work exists at the (Museo Morandi), a branch of the Museo d'Arte Moderna di Bologna founded in 1993 by Franco Solmi (previous director of the Galleria d'Arte Moderna, Bologna) and the municipality of Bologna. The Centro Studi Giorgio Morandi and its president, Marilena Pasquali, also contributed to the museum's foundation. Morandi's works and atelier, which were owned by his family, were donated to the museum by his sister Maria Teresa Morandi. Today, the museum includes a reconstruction of Morandi's studio.

Other significant public collections of Morandi include those of the Vatican Museums, where an entire room is devoted to his work; the Estorick Collection of Modern Italian Art in London, which owns at least twenty Morandi paintings and etchings; and the Magnani-Rocca Foundation in Parma.

Lesser collections of Morandi's work are owned by major museums around the world, including the Louvre; the Musée d'Orsay; the Tate Modern; the Hermitage Museum; the National Museum of Art, Osaka; the Metropolitan Museum of Art; and the National Gallery of Art, from which two Morandi paintings were chosen by President Barack Obama for inclusion in the White House Collection.

=== Exhibitions ===
Although Morandi was not greatly concerned with exhibitions during his own lifetime, his works have been subsequently displayed in the Museo d'Arte Moderna di Bologna (MAMbo) and many other cities. From April 30, 1998, the exhibition "The Later Morandi. Still Lifes 1950–1964", curated by Laura Mattioli Rossi, was inaugurated at the Peggy Guggenheim Museum in Venice, at first held at Galleria dello Scudo, Verona, in winter 1997–98.

In 2008, a retrospective of Morandi's career including over 100 works was held at the Metropolitan Museum of Art in New York City. In 2009 The Phillips Collection exhibited Morandi: Master of Modern Still Life. In 2010, twenty-one works were shown at the Fortuny Museum in Venice, curated by the director Daniela Ferretti and Franco Calarota. From 1 June - 18 July 2010, the Fundación Juan March, Madrid exhibited Giorgio Morandi. Three Watercolours and Twelve Etchings, a small exhibit drawn from private collections of works created between 1927 and 1962. The exhibit travelled to Museu Fundación Juan March, Palma (11 November 2010 - 26 February 2011) and Museo de Arte Abstracto Español, Cuenca (18 March - 12 June 2011).

In 2013, a Morandi exhibition was held at the Centre for Fine Arts in Brussels, Belgium (with guest artist Luc Tuymans). In 2014–15, Ettore Spalletti exhibited his works in dialogue with Morandi's at Galleria d'Arte Maggiore g.a.m. in Bologna; the show was curated by Franco and Roberta Calarota.

Other notable exhibitions of Morandi's work have been held at the David Zwirner Gallery in New York (2015 and 2025); the Center for Italian Modern Art in New York (2016); the Museum of Grenoble (2021); and the Royal Palace of Milan (2023–24). An exhibition pairing paintings by Morandi with those of Old Masters he admired, including Crespi and Zurbarán, was staged at the Guggenheim Museum Bilbao in 2019.

=== Art market ===
Natura Morta, oil on canvas (1956)

Morandi's paintings rarely appear at auction, but have sold in excess of US$1 million. In 2018, a rare oval-shaped Morandi painting from the collection of David Rockefeller sold at Christie's in New York for US$4.3 million, setting a record for the artist.

== Additional references ==
- Abramowicz, Janet (2004), Giorgio Morandi: The Art of Silence, New Haven, [Conn.]: Yale University Press. ISBN 0-300-10036-1.
- Bell, Jane (1982), "Messages in Bottles: the Noble Grandeur of Giorgio Morandi", ARTnews, March 1982: 114–117.
- Bandera, Maria Cristina and Miracco, Renato (eds) (2008), Giorgio Morandi 1890-1964, exh. cat. (New York, Metropolitan Museum of Art, 2008–2009), Milan.
- Cowling, Elizabeth and Mundy, Jennifer (1990), On Classic Ground: Picasso, Léger, de Chirico and the New Classicism 1910–1930, London: Tate Gallery. ISBN 1-85437-043-X.
- Morandi, Giorgio (1988), Morandi, New York: Rizzoli. ISBN 0-8478-0930-7.
- Pasquali, Marilena (2008), "Giorgio Morandi: saggi e ricerche 1990-2007", Florence: Noèdizioni.
- Vitali, Lamberto (1977), Morandi: Catalogo Generale, 2 vols, Milan: Electa. ISBN 978-88435-0849-5.
