= Galleria d'Arte Moderna, Bologna =

- Galleria d'Arte Moderna di Bologna
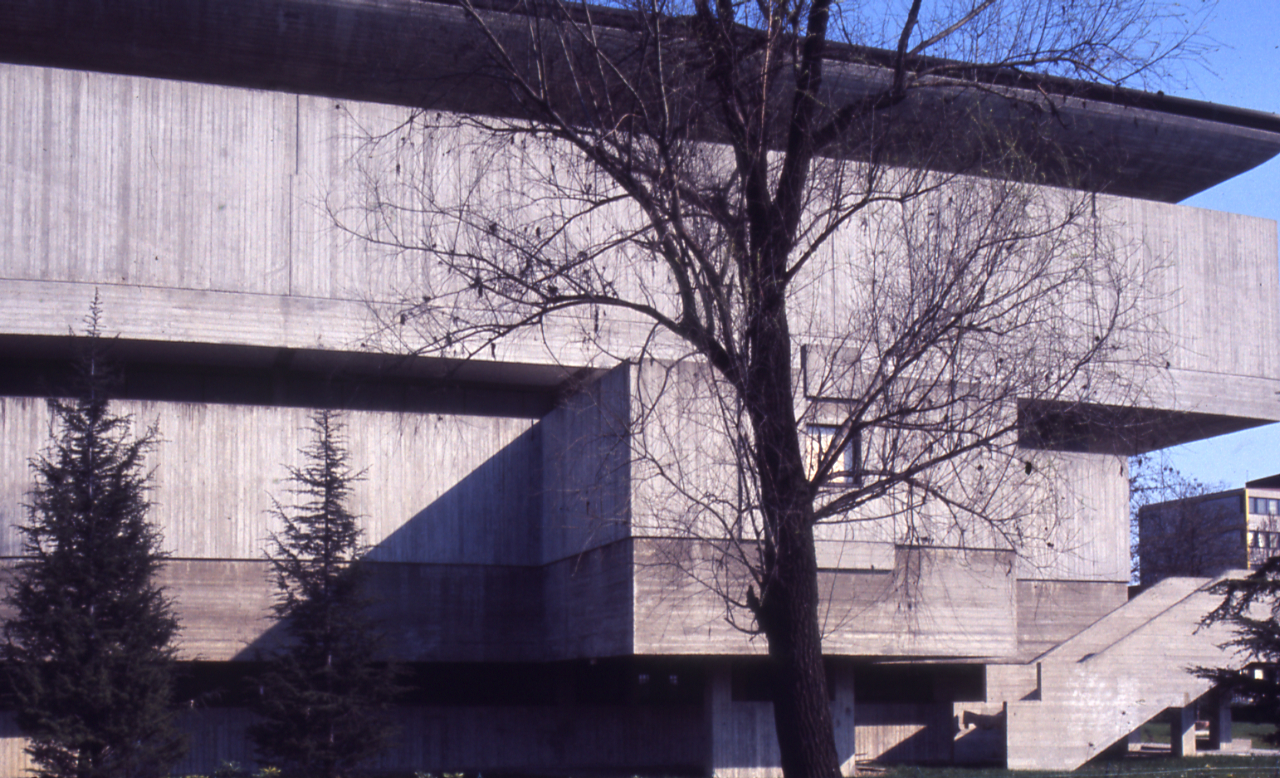
- The gallery building designed by Leone Pancaldi, circa 1975. Photo by Paolo Monti
- Interactive fullscreen map
- Established: 1926
- Location: Via Don Minzoni 14, Bologna, Italy
- Coordinates: 44°30′09″N 11°20′13″E
- Type: Art gallery
- Collection size: more than 3500
- Public transit access: Bologna Centrale: 33 to Don Minzoni
- Website: galleriadartemoderna.bo.it

The Galleria d'Arte Moderna of Bologna is the modern art museum of the city. It has five exhibition venues: MAMbo, the Museo d'Arte Moderna di Bologna; the Villa delle Rose; the Museo Morandi; Casa Morandi; and the Museo per la Memoria di Ustica. The collections consist of more than 3,500 items of modern and contemporary art.

== History ==
The gallery was founded in 1925, in the Villa delle Rose, a building donated to the City of Bologna by Countess Nerina Armandi Avogli. The collection was re-ordered in 1936. Soon, thanks to many acquisitions and bequests, the collection grew large and by 1961 had already reached more than 2,000 items.

In 1975 some works were transferred to a new building, designed by Leone Pancaldi, in the Fair district. The building was opened on May 1, 1975, in the industrial north of Bologna. Its architecture a Brutalist exterior with an open and well-lit interior. It had an exhibition surface of about 2,700 square metres (29,000 sq ft) and hosted both the permanent collection, whose works where exhibited in rotation, and temporary exhibitions.

On 5 May 2007 the new venue for modern and contemporary art was inaugurated in the former bakery in Don Minzoni street (in the new cultural district Manifattura delle Arti).It was named Museo d'Arte Moderna di Bologna (or MAMbo) and, with more than 9,500 square metres (102,000 sq ft), became one of the most important Italian museums dedicated to contemporary art.

== See also ==
- List of museums in Italy
