= Liu Yiqian =

Chinese billionaire investor

- Born: 1963 (age 62–63); Shanghai, China
- Occupation: Businessman
- Known for: Chairman of Sunline Group
- Spouse: Wang Wei

Chinese name
- Simplified Chinese: 刘益谦
- Traditional Chinese: 劉益謙
Transcriptions
Standard Mandarin
- Hanyu Pinyin: Liú Yìqiān

Liu Yiqian (Chinese: 刘益谦; pinyin: Liú Yìqiān, pronounced [ljǒʊ îtɕʰjɛ́n], born 1963) is a Chinese billionaire investor and art collector. An autodidact who formerly worked as a taxi driver, he has built his fortune since the mid-1980s by investing in publicly listed shares, real estate and pharmaceuticals.

== Biography ==
Born in 1963 into a working-class family in Shanghai, Liu Yiqian dropped out of school at the age of 14, in order to help his mother to sell handbags on the street. Then he became a taxi driver in Shanghai for two years in the mid-1980s, before making his fortune in the 1990s as part of the new rich who emerged after China's reform and opening up. He bought shares, paying around 160 yuan ($30) a share, of a Chinese company which became one of the first to list on the stock exchange as China began developing its capital markets. As a consequence, in just two years, the share price jumped to over 10,000 yuan. Liu increased his fortune by touring the major cities to buy up shares in state-owned enterprises from their market economy from unaware employees before these enterprises listed.

He met his wife Wang Wei as he was a taxi driver in Shanghai, after Liu saw a photograph of Wang at a mutual friend's place. They have three daughters and one son.

== Business ==
Liu is chairman of Sunline Group, a Shanghai-based investment company. As of 2010, the value of his real estate properties have increased to 10 billion yuan (US$1.6 billion) over the past 19 years.

In 2004, Liu established the companies Tianping Auto Insurance and Guohua Life Insurance. In April 2013, Tianping formed a joint venture with AXA.

According to Forbes, as of July 2015, Liu has a net worth of US$1.37 billion. He ranked as the 163rd wealthiest individual in China and 1,533rd wealthiest in the world.

== Art collecting ==
In 2011, Liu combined two separate pieces by Qi Baishi to make Eagle Standing on Pine Tree, which sold at auction for over $65 million USD through China Guardian. The sale gained international attention after the successful bidder refused to pay, claiming that the painting was a forgery.

In April 2014, Liu paid HK$281.24 million ($36.3 million USD) for a 500-year-old Ming dynasty doucai chicken cup.

In March 2015, he paid HK$348 million ($45 million USD) for a 600-year-old embroidered silk thangka (tapestry) that was commissioned by the Yongle Emperor of the Ming dynasty. It was a record high price for a Chinese work of art sold by an international auction house. Later that month, he bought an antique Tibetan bronze yogi sitting in the lotus position at an auction at Sotheby's in New York.

In April 2015, he paid US$14.7 million for a Guan ware vase from the Southern Song dynasty.

In November 2015, he bought Italian painter Amedeo Modigliani's Nu couché (1917–18), a widely known painting of a reclining nude woman, for US$170.4 million, the second-highest price for an artwork at auction, in a volatile sale at Christie's in New York. He paid for the painting with his American Express Centurion card.

== Long Museum ==
Liu and his wife Wang Wei founded the Long Museum, with two locations in Shanghai. In 2016, a third location was opened in Chongqing and a Wuhan branch is scheduled for 2018.
