= Interchange (de Kooning) =

Painting by Willem de Kooning

- Artist: Willem de Kooning
- Year: 1955; 71 years ago
- Medium: Oil paint on canvas
- Dimensions: 200.7 cm × 175.3 cm (79.0 in × 69.0 in)
- Location: Private collection of Kenneth C. Griffin

Interchange, also known as Interchanged, is a 1955 abstract expressionist oil painting on canvas by Dutch-American painter Willem de Kooning (1904–1997). Like Jackson Pollock, de Kooning was one of the early artists of the abstract expressionism movement, the first American modern art movement. The painting measures 200.7 by 175.3 centimetres (79.0 by 69.0 in) and was completed in 1955. It marked the transition of the subjects of de Kooning's paintings from women to abstract urban landscapes. It reflects a transition in de Kooning's painting technique due to the influence of artist Franz Kline, who inspired de Kooning to paint with quickly made gestural marks as opposed to violent brush strokes. The painting features a fleshy pink mass at its center, representing a seated woman.

Originally sold by the artist in 1955 for $4,000, it was sold by the David Geffen Foundation to Kenneth C. Griffin for $300 million in September 2015, then ranking it second on the list of most expensive paintings. It was later on loan at the Art Institute of Chicago, but by 2024 was no longer there. It is now ranked second on the list of most expensive paintings, surpassed only by Leonardo da Vinci’s Salvator Mundi, which sold for $450.3 million in November 2017.

== Background ==
Interchange was completed in 1955. de Kooning had concentrated much of the early part of the 1950s reworking abstract figure study works of the female figure which he started in 1948. These were associated with his solo exhibition in 1953 which was called Paintings on the Theme of the Woman which opened in New York City that year. Some of the titles for these works were associated with various states of Woman I, Woman III and Woman, as well as Two Standing Women. By 1955, de Kooning had moved away from painting the human form and continued with the abstract rendering of the architecture and communities of his surroundings in New York City. Some of de Kooning's 1955 oil paintings prominent at that time were Police Gazette, Composition, Gotham News, Saturday Night, and Easter Monday.

=== Name of the painting ===
De Kooning's preferences for the selection of names for his oil paintings appeared to correspond to references to the neighborhood where he was living at that time in New York City, for example, Interchange.

== Ownership history ==
De Kooning sold the painting in the Sidney Janis Gallery shortly after it was completed for $4,000 to architect Edgar Kaufmann Jr., whose father Edgar J. Kaufmann owned Kaufmann's department store in Pittsburgh. Kauffman's estate sold the painting, alongside other pieces of his art collection, at Sotheby's in New York in November 1989, during the Japanese asset price bubble, to Japanese art dealer Shigeki Kameyama, owner of the Mountain Tortoise Gallery in Tokyo, for $20.7 million, setting a then-record price for a living artist. The sale occurred 3 months after a judge declared de Kooning to be mentally incompetent due to Alzheimer's disease.

The painting was sold a few years later to David Geffen, at a loss due to the bursting of the Japanese asset price bubble and the early 1990s recession.

In September 2015, Geffen sold Interchange for $300 million to hedge fund manager and billionaire Kenneth C. Griffin. Griffin paid $500 million for two artworks, including $200 million for Jackson Pollock's Number 17A.
