= Woman VI =

1953 painting by Willem de Kooning

- Artist: Willem de Kooning
- Year: 1953
- Medium: Oil on canvas
- Dimensions: 176 cm × 148.6 cm (68.5 in × 58.5 in)
- Location: Carnegie Museum of Art, Pittsburgh

Woman VI is a 1953 abstract work of art painted by Willem de Kooning and first displayed at the Sidney Janis Gallery in Manhattan. Since the 1955 Carnegie International Exhibition, Woman VI has been on view at the Carnegie Museum of Art as part of the Postwar Abstraction collection. The Woman paintings of the early 1950s are widely considered to be de Kooning’s most important works for their significance to postwar American cultural history and social events, such as the mid-century Feminist Movements. Many of the paintings are speculated to be abstracted portraits of Marilyn Monroe. Woman VI is notable within the series for its brighter palette of green and red paint employed in larger fields of color.

As decolonization spread throughout the globe, the Cold War powers offered competing models for economic and political modernization, as well as models for the art world. The reasons why abstract expressionism took place in the 1950s are still a matter of debate. However, the political limitation was one of the definite reasons. After World War II, the political climate did not tolerate the social pretests of these painters anymore. The McCarthy era after World War II was a time of artistic censorship in the United States, but, if the subject matter were totally abstract, then it would be seen as apolitical, and, therefore, safe. The wartime shifted the artists’ perspectives of the art world from representational, single-style painting to an abstract, combination of multiple styles painting. For example, Thomas B. Hess, the longtime executive editor of ARTnews, pointed out about de Kooning’s works that

"…Similar themes of Pompeian color - blue, pink, ochre, alluding to the Boscoreale frescoes in the Metropolitan as well as to the Broadway neon - similar hooking forms and flickering contours, tie the works so closely together that the whole idea of a ‘breakthrough’ seems a bit juvenile - like an advertising agency’s gimmick to sell History."

Boscoreale frescoes used to be an important painting technique in Roman art. Hess is explaining that Abstract Expressionism is a "breakthrough" because it is a style that combines both European art colors and American abstract forms. Considering De Kooning’s Dutch background, his paintings actually combined more than three styles. De Kooning is an important artist to the museum because he brought his craft a rigorous European academic training and close familiarity with the past art of past that set him apart from many of his American contemporaries.

== Artist ==
De Kooning (1904 – 1997) was a Dutch-born American painter. His exceptional talent was discovered by Jaap Gidding; he decided to enroll de Kooning as a night student at the Rotterdam Academy of Fine Arts and Techniques, where he remained for eight years. The Dutch system of integrating fine and applied arts imbued in de Kooning a respect for tradition and craft that remained fundamental for his work. De Kooning’s painting contains enormous details, which allowed the viewers take time to absorb.

De Kooning as painter who knows the value of history, sought to understand the recent history of paintings thoroughly. In post-World War II era, de Kooning painted in an Abstract Expressionist style, also known as Action painting, whose painterly gesturalism transcended the conventional definitions of figuration and abstraction, and he substantially influenced art after World War II, becoming one of a group of artists that came to be known as the New York School. Jackson Pollock, Franz Kline, as well as Arshile Gorky are also regard as members of the New York avant-garde, with de Kooning championed as the leader of the movement.

== Visual analysis ==
Woman VI is a life-sized painting. A woman figure stands in the center of the painting, the proportion of the figure on the painting is two thirds. There are many Abstract Expressionist elements in the painting, such as the composition, space, line, and color.

By combining simple, large shapes with violent, slashing brushwork, De Kooning has created a bold and dramatic composition. The female figure is built using an odd geometry. Two circle eyes peer comically out of a smeared face. The irregular shape of the chest, the broken arms, and the absence hands or feet gives the figure a sense of disintegration. This fracturing is heightened by a background composed of similar geometric shapes that flatten the picture plane; there is no delineation of space between the figure and ground. Though the painting demonstrates a palpable pictorial tension and frenetic energy, the composition also produces a unique sense of balance and harmony.

When observing the painting, one experiences a viewpoint from below because the head stands high. It is not a symmetrical composition, but either side looks quite balanced. This is because the main figure is on the vertical axis, and the horizontal axis goes through her abdomen. It is a two-dimensional painting, for there is no illusion of depth and the canvas is all surface. Each part of the composition conveys a sense of unity. The emphasis of motif, which is woman, was achieved through the position and large scale.

== Gender ==
Woman VI was originally displayed with the other five Woman paintings, Woman I to Woman V. The reason why de Kooning placed these six paintings together as an exhibition is because he wanted to give the audience a sense of women’s changing through all the ages, and to liberate the character of women from a restraining social environment. Because Woman VI is the last one in the Woman series, and it looks more abstract as well as less human. The abstract form of the female figure gained some negative critiques for de Kooning. For example, Clement Greenberg, thought de Kooning had taken a wrong turn with the Woman series, and woman figure should not be painted larger than human size. Much to de Kooning’s surprise, however, the show was a success, not just among many artists but among a public increasingly eager to embrace American painting. According to Irving Sandler, an art historian who has chronicled the development of postwar American art, it was de Kooning who “was able to continue the grand tradition of Western painting and to deflect it in a new direction, creating an avant-garde style that spoke to our time.” De Kooning represented a new era of the art world in 1950s, and the subject, which is woman, he depicted could also have a new time. To those critics against his Woman series, de Kooning simply responded, “it is all about freedom.” Mona Lisa probably the best-known painting in the history of art, due to it mystery forms and figure. Only her gaze is fixed on the observer and seems to welcome them to this silent communication. The renaissance book warned women that they should never look directly at a man. The motif freedom is one of the reasons that the Carnegie Museum of Art should keep this painting in its possession. Woman VI highlights the gender problem in 1950s America, just before American Feminist Movement of the 1960s and 1970s.

== Abstract expressionism ==
Woman VI is placing in the Postwar Abstraction collection in the Carnegie Museum of Art. This painting along with the collection are considering an important part of American art history. The history of Abstract Expressionism is tied closely to the history of post–World War II because it was an art movement that began in the 1940s. During and after World War II, as the center of international power moved to America, expressing itself most directly in New York city, a new art was born. In 1946, Robert Coates, the critic for the New Yorker, applied the term "Abstract Expressionism" to the work of certain of these New York-based painters, like de Kooning.

== Technique ==
The medium and facture is part of the painting as well, and they also support the Woman VI to distinguish from other paintings.

"In the large ‘Woman’ painting, de Kooning carries his concern with detail and shifting focus to an extreme point. He has always allowed details to absorb him, and often worked with notes, much as an author would, saving a phrase here to there for proper occasion."

De Kooning is not only an artist, but also a writer. His painting process marked him unique from the other artists. Unquestionably, Woman VI is remarkable for its emphatic surface texture, in large part a result of the materials that de Kooning chose

"A type of brushwork conspicuous in Woman that de Kooning was to make decidedly his own, a technique in which paint has been slapped on and scraped leaving streaks of different colors…"

The innovation of the brushwork made by de Kooning distinguished Woman VI from the other paintings in the gallery. The effect of the materials, which is oil on canvas, shows the long-time making process. Woman VI is a large-scale painting, and the oil allows artists to have more time to finish it because of its slow drying time. The oil can also be left to dry for long periods of time, and, in fact, the painting needs to be exposed to the air for several weeks for drying. This characteristic made it possible for de Kooning to work on this painting over several sessions without fear of the paint drying up too early, and it is easy to make changes to the finished part. In de Kooning’s book, he wrote,

"painting, any kind of painting is a way of living today, a style of living so to speak. That is where the form of it lies." De Kooning was more focused on paintings during his career because he believed that only paintings could speak for him.
