= Clamdigger =

Clamdigger may refer to:

- One who engages in clam digging
- Clamdigger (de Kooning), a bronze sculpture by Willem de Kooning
- Clamdigger (train), a discontinued commuter train in Connecticut, US
- Clamdiggers or capri pants, a three-quarter length pants style
