= Ernst Beyeler =

Swiss art dealer and collector

- Beyeler in 1970
- Born: 16 July 1921; Basel, Switzerland
- Died: 25 February 2010 (aged 88); Basel, Switzerland
- Occupations: Art dealer and collector
- Known for: Beyeler Foundation
- Spouse: Hilda "Hildy" Kunz (1922–2008) (m. 1948)

Ernst Beyeler (16 July 1921 – 25 February 2010) was a Swiss art dealer and collector, who became "Europe’s pre-eminent dealer in modern art", according to The New York Times, and "the greatest art dealer since the war", according to The Daily Telegraph. In 1982, he and his wife founded the Beyeler Foundation to show his private collection, which on his death was valued at US$1.85 billion.

== Early life ==
Beyeler was born in Basel, Switzerland, on 16 July 1921, the son of an employee of Swiss railways. He received his advanced education at the University of Basel where he studied art history and economics.

== Career ==
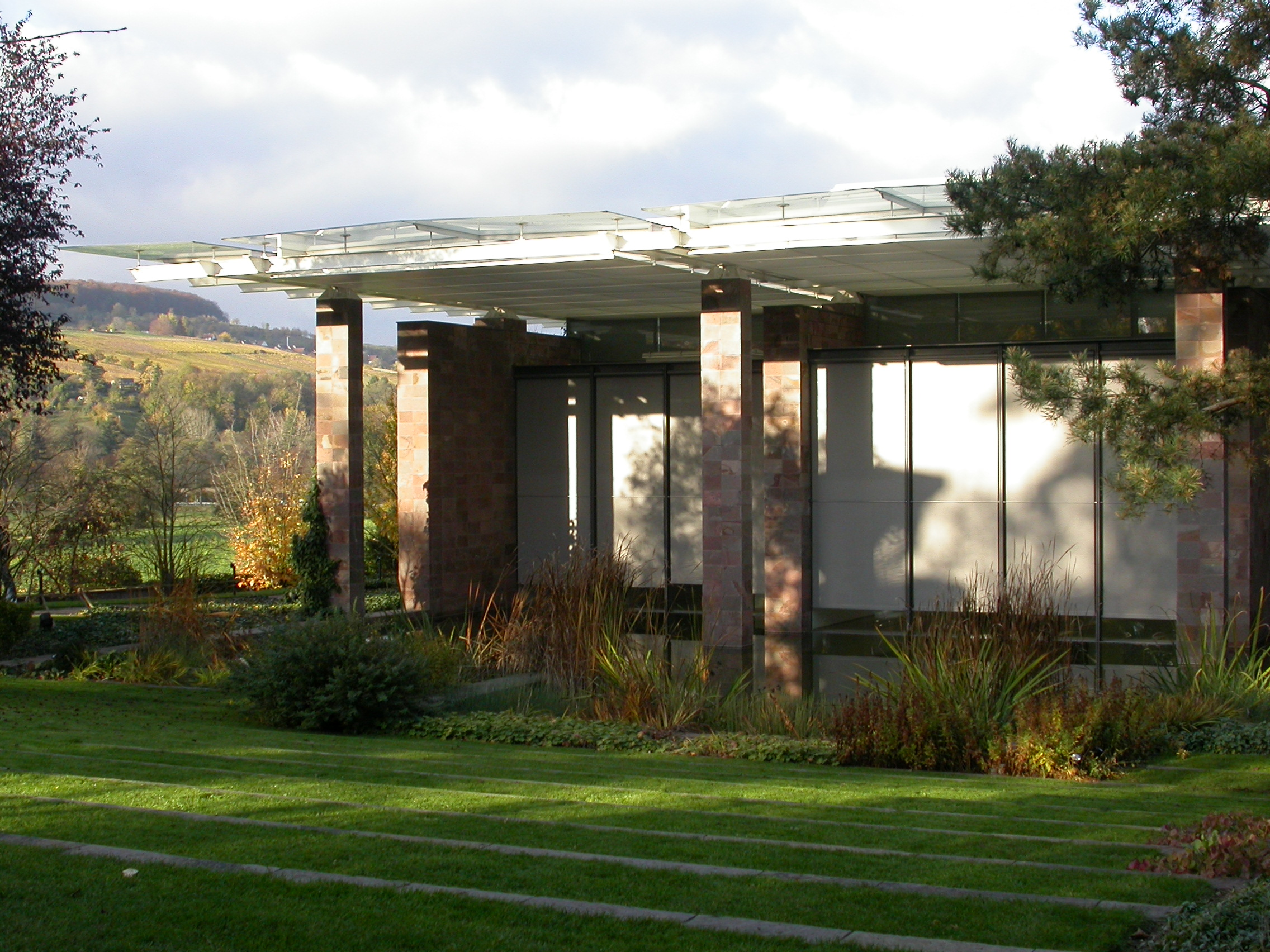
Beyeler Foundation in Riehen (Basel), Switzerland

Beyeler originally intended to become an economist, but the outbreak of the Second World War prevented him from leaving Switzerland and instead he became apprenticed to Oskar Schloss, an antiquarian bookseller in Basel. When Schloss died in 1945, Beyeler took over the firm at age 24. He gradually moved into art dealing and had his first exhibition, of Japanese woodcuts, just two years later.

A key development in his career was the purchase in the early 1960s of 340 art works from the American banker, industrialist and art collector G. David Thompson. The collection included works by Georges Braque, Paul Cézanne, Paul Klee, Léger, Henri Matisse, Claude Monet, Pablo Picasso, and Mondrian. Beyeler bought 70 works by Alberto Giacometti from Thompson which were divided between the Kunsthaus Zürich, the Basel Kunstmuseum and the Kunstmuseum Winterthur. According to the Pittsburgh Quarterly, the "decision [of the Carnegie Museum of Art] not to build a Thompson building clearly made Beyeler's fortune, and ironically, it is Beyeler who has a museum containing his collection and bearing his name in Basel, Switzerland."

Beyeler developed "close relationships with many of the twentieth century's great artists". He became friends with Picasso in the 1950s and when he visited Mougins in 1966, Picasso allowed him to choose 26 paintings to sell.

In 1973, the US$180,000 he paid for Willem de Kooning’s abstract landscape Police Gazette set a new record for the artist, as did the US$14.7 million he paid in 1989 for Fernand Léger's cubist painting Forms in Contrast. His art collection was eventually worth at least CHF 2 billion (£1.21 billion). In 2010, The Washington Post reported that his collection was "worth at least $1.85 billion".

In 1982, together with his wife, fellow art dealer Hilda "Hildy" Kunz, he founded the Beyeler Foundation to showcase his private collection.

== Personal life ==
In 1948, Beyeler married Hilda "Hildy" Kunz (1922–2008), incorrectly reported in The Daily Telegraph as "Kunst" (the German word for "art").

== Death ==
Beyeler died on 25 February 2010, at his home near Basel. He had no children.

In their obituaries of Beyeler, The New York Times called him "Europe's pre-eminent dealer in modern art", and The Daily Telegraph described him as "the greatest art dealer since the war", who "assembled one of the world's most impressive collections of 20th-century paintings."
