= Man with Pipe =

Painting by Jean Metzinger

- Le Fumeur (French)
- Artist: Jean Metzinger
- Year: c. 1912–13
- Medium: Oil on canvas
- Dimensions: 129.7 cm × 96.68 cm (51.06 in × 38.06 in)
- Location: Carnegie Museum of Art, Pittsburgh

Man with Pipe (French: Le Fumeur) is a Cubist painting by the French artist Jean Metzinger. It has been suggested that the sitter depicted in the painting represents either Guillaume Apollinaire or Max Jacob. The work was exhibited in the spring of 1914 at the Salon des Indépendants, Paris, Champ-de-Mars, March 1–April 30, 1914, no. 2289, Room 11. A photograph of Le Fumeur was published in Le Petit Comtois (Au Salon des Indépendants, Les chefs-d'œuvre modernes), 13 March 1914, for the occasion of the exhibition. In July 1914 the painting was exhibited in Berlin at Herwarth Walden’s Galerie Der Sturm, with works by Albert Gleizes, Raymond Duchamp-Villon and Jacques Villon.

Le Fumeur, titled Man with Pipe and dated c. 1912, forms part of the permanent collection of the Carnegie Museum of Art, Pittsburgh, Pennsylvania (gift of G. David Thompson, 1953).

== Description ==
Le Fumeur, signed "JMetzinger" (lower left) is an oil painting on canvas with dimensions 129.7 x 96.68 cm (51 1/16 x 38 1/16 in.), representing an elegantly dressed man—sitting in what appears to be a café—perhaps Guillaume Apollinaire or Max Jacob, two long-time friend of the artist. The vertical composition is painted in a geometrically Cubist style. The sitter, smoking a pipe and wearing a fashionable black felt derby hat, is seen in multiple perspective; from different points of view simultaneously.

Jean Metzinger, 1911–12, Man with a Pipe (Portrait of an American Smoker), oil on canvas, 92.7 x 65.4 cm (36.5 x 25.75 in), Lawrence University, Appleton, Wisconsin. Reproduced on the catalogue cover of Exhibition of Cubist and Futurist Pictures, Boggs & Buhl Department Store, Pittsburgh, July 1913

The global composition is highly geometricized, with various planes, angles, layers and facets, as are specific elements depicted on the trompe-l'œil wooden table in the foreground (as if seen from above). The roundness and shading of the man's attire (particularly in the sleeves) stands in sharp contrast to the angular momentum engendered by the overall cubic construction of the piece; while the chairs in the lower half of the work and flowered wallpaper of the background are treated in comparatively naturalistic detail, similar to the backgrounds of late 19th century portraits.

The colors used by Metzinger, accentuated by a contrasting range of blacks and whites, are bright and largely unmixed. The move away from more subtle tonalities of his earlier Cubist work; Portrait of an American Smoker, Portrait of Albert Gleizes (both from 1911–12) closely relates Le Fumeur with a series of portraits painted by Metzinger circa 1913; Woman with a Fan, Portrait of Max Jacob, and La Fumeuse. As in these latter works, the decorative patterning assumes a principal role in the composition.

== Apollinaire or Max Jacob ==
Jean Metzinger, 1911, Etude pour le portrait de Guillaume Apollinaire, mine graphite sur papier vergé rose, 48 x 31.2 cm, Musée National d'Art Moderne, Centre Georges Pompidou, Paris

In his review of an exhibition at Galerie Der Sturm during the month of July, 1914, Guillaume Apollinaire writes of Metzinger’s Man with Pipe as a portrait of himself:

Albert Gleizes, Jean Metzinger, Duchamp-Villon, and Jacques Villon are currently exhibiting at the Der Sturm gallery in Berlin. Jean Metzinger represents an extremely sophisticated art. He completes to perfection what he paints—not satisfying himself by drawing, he states. If Mr. Ingres, in spite of his considerable reputation, did not have somewhat restrained press, I would say he has the Japanese qualities of Ingresque painting. Fumeur, Tête de Femme, Marine, Nuit, Paysage, La Liseuse, and En Canot, which is with Fumeur cited above and said to be a portrait of myself, his masterpiece, this is what connoisseurs of the Spree will fight over with perseverance. (Apollinaire, Paris-Journal, 3 July 1914)

Metzinger had painted the portrait of Apollinaire on a prior occasion. Late 1909 or early 1910, Metzinger painted a Cubist portrait of Apollinaire. In his Vie anecdotique, 16 October 1911, the poet proudly writes: "I am honored to be the first model of a Cubist painter, Jean Metzinger, for a portrait exhibited in 1910 at the Salon des Indépendants." It was not only the first Cubist portrait, according to Apollinaire, but it was also the first great portrait of the poet exhibited in public, prior to others by Louis Marcoussis, Amedeo Modigliani, Pablo Picasso and Mikhail Larionov. Apollinaire became the subject of at least one other work by Metzinger; Étude pour le portrait d'Apollinaire, 1911 (Musée National d'Art Moderne, Paris).

The model is seen smoking a pipe, as did Apollinaire, but Cubist portraits did not always accurately represent characteristics of the sitter. The pipe was a common theme in the poems of Stéphane Mallarmé and was used as a sexual device by several Cubists because of its phallic symbolism. "The question of identity in Metzinger’s portraits is further obscured by their titles" writes Joann Moser, for example, "the study for the Portrait of Apollinaire would seem to be a study for the Portrait of an American Smoker… Although Apollinaire did smoke a pipe, the man portrayed in the drawing does not have the round cheeks and double chin characteristic of Apollinaire. The later Man with Pipe [Le Fumeur] would seem to resemble Apollinaire more closely, yet it is obviously the same sitter as Portrait of Max Jacob". (Moser, p. 44)

(center) Jean Metzinger, c.1913, Le Fumeur (Man with Pipe), Carnegie Museum of Art, Pittsburgh; (left) Alexander Archipenko, 1914, Danseuse du Médrano (Médrano II), (right) Archipenko, 1913, Pierrot-carrousel, Solomon R. Guggenheim Museum, New York. Published in Le Petit Comtois, 13 March 1914

Metzinger’s study for the Portrait of Apollinaire, coupled with period photographs of the poet and Cubist portraits by other artists around 1912 and 1913, argue persuasively, according to the Carnegie Museum of Art, that Apollinaire was indeed the man in Metzinger's café. "Likenesses by Louis Marcoussis and Pablo Picasso, which simplify and caricature Apollinaire's features, emphasize the wide, rounded jaw line and almond-shaped eyes of Metzinger's subject. Assuming that Metzinger carried through with a portrait of Apollinaire, Man with Pipe would seem to be it".

== Salon des Indépendants 1914 ==
A photograph of Metzinger's Le Fumeur published in a review of the 1914 Salon des Indépendants has confirmed that this painting was indeed exhibited at this Salon. Because of the vagueness of Metzinger's catalogue entry titles, and due to the multiple paintings by the artist showing models smoking pipes or cigarettes, it had been hitherto unknown precisely which of his works had been exhibited at the 1914 Indépendants. Moser, for example, writes in 1985 that a painting titled Le Fumeur (which could have been either Portrait de Max Jacob or Man with Pipe) was exhibited at the 1914 Salon des Indépendants (note 10, p. 47).

== Mobile perspective ==
Rather than depicting the Man with Pipe from one point of view, Metzinger uses the concept he developed in 1910 of 'mobile perspective' to portray the subject from a variety of angles. The sitter’s face, clothes, hat are observed from a succession of spatial angles or locations captured over an extended period of time, resulting in a complex series of profile and frontal views seen simultaneously. The chairs, table and objects place on it, are seen from entirely different angles from the sitter.

Cubist portraits typically presented the sitter in half length, with few identifying attributes; however faceted or fragmented the forms, the likeness was preserved through replication of the sitter's distinctive features. Figures were often treated frontally and shown sitting behind a table like the café patron in Man with Pipe. The café, a favorite subject and setting since the Impressionists, is a major theme in Cubist painting, too, as a setting for figures and also as a source for still-life objects. In Man with Pipe Metzinger turned away from the all-over faceting of his subject and toward the use of distinct, brightly painted shapes. A few "cubes" are clustered near the center of the painting, and the objects in the foreground have structural dislocations. (Carnegie Museum of Art)

== Related works ==
Jean Metzinger, 1912, At the Cycle-Race Track (Au Vélodrome), oil and sand on canvas, 130.4 x 97.1 cm (51.4 x 38.25 in.) The Solomon R. Guggenheim Foundation, Peggy Guggenheim Collection, Venice

Jean Metzinger, 1912–1913, L'Oiseau bleu, (The Blue Bird), oil on canvas, 230 x 196 cm, Musée d'Art Moderne de la Ville de Paris

Jean Metzinger, 1913, La Femme à l'Éventail (Woman with a Fan), oil on canvas, 92.8 x 65.2 cm, Art Institute of Chicago

Jean Metzinger, 1913, En Canot (Im Boot), oil on canvas, 146 x 114 cm (57.5 in × 44.9 in), exhibited at Moderni Umeni, S.V.U. Mánes, Prague, 1914, acquired in 1916 by Georg Muche at the Galerie Der Sturm, confiscated by the Nazis circa 1936, displayed at the Degenerate Art show in Munich, and missing ever since

Jean Metzinger, c.1915, L'infirmière (The Nurse), published in l'Elan, Number 9, 12 February 1916

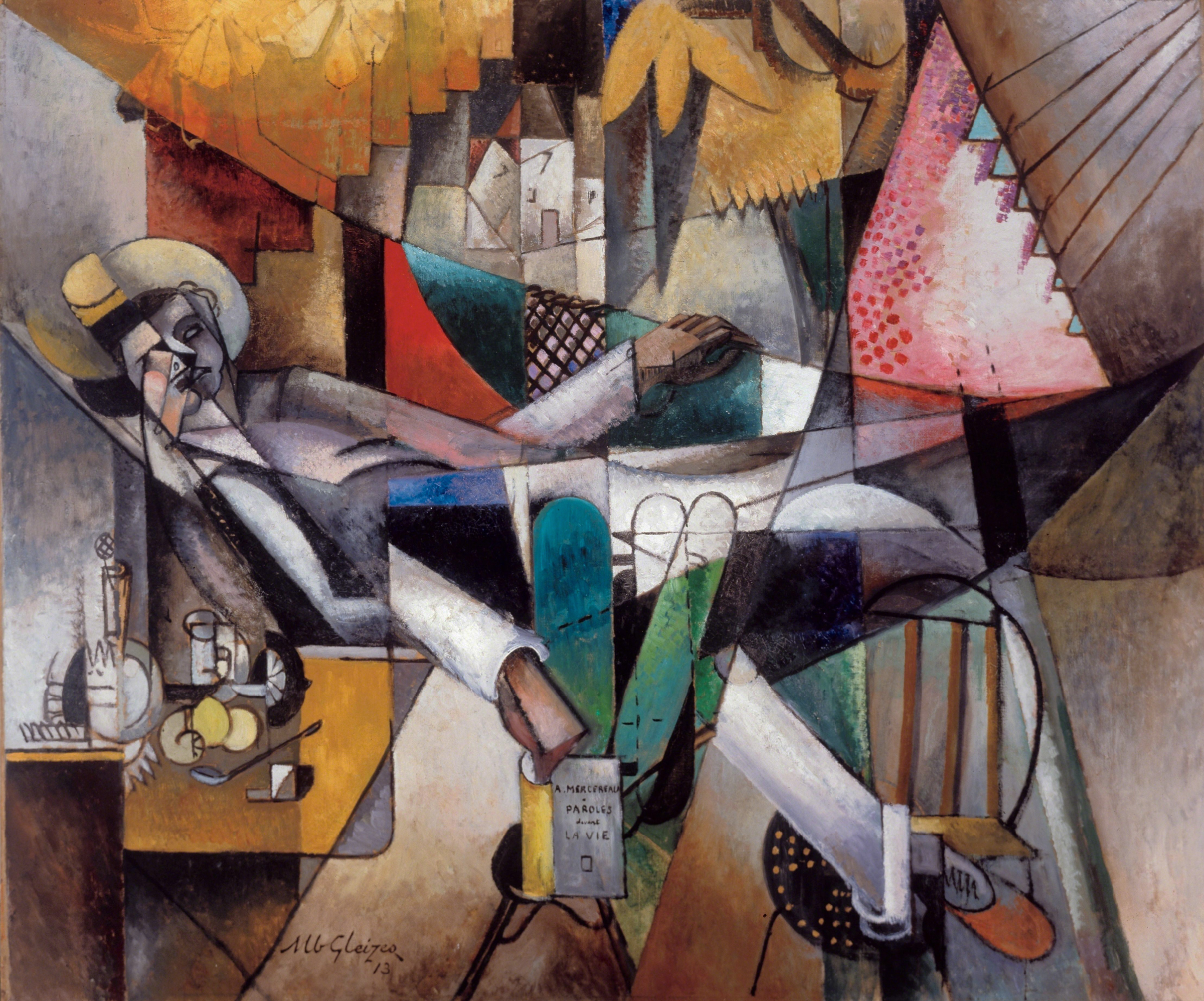
Albert Gleizes, 1913, L'Homme au Hamac (Man in a Hammock), oil on canvas, 130 x 155.5 cm, Albright-Knox Art Gallery, Buffalo, New York

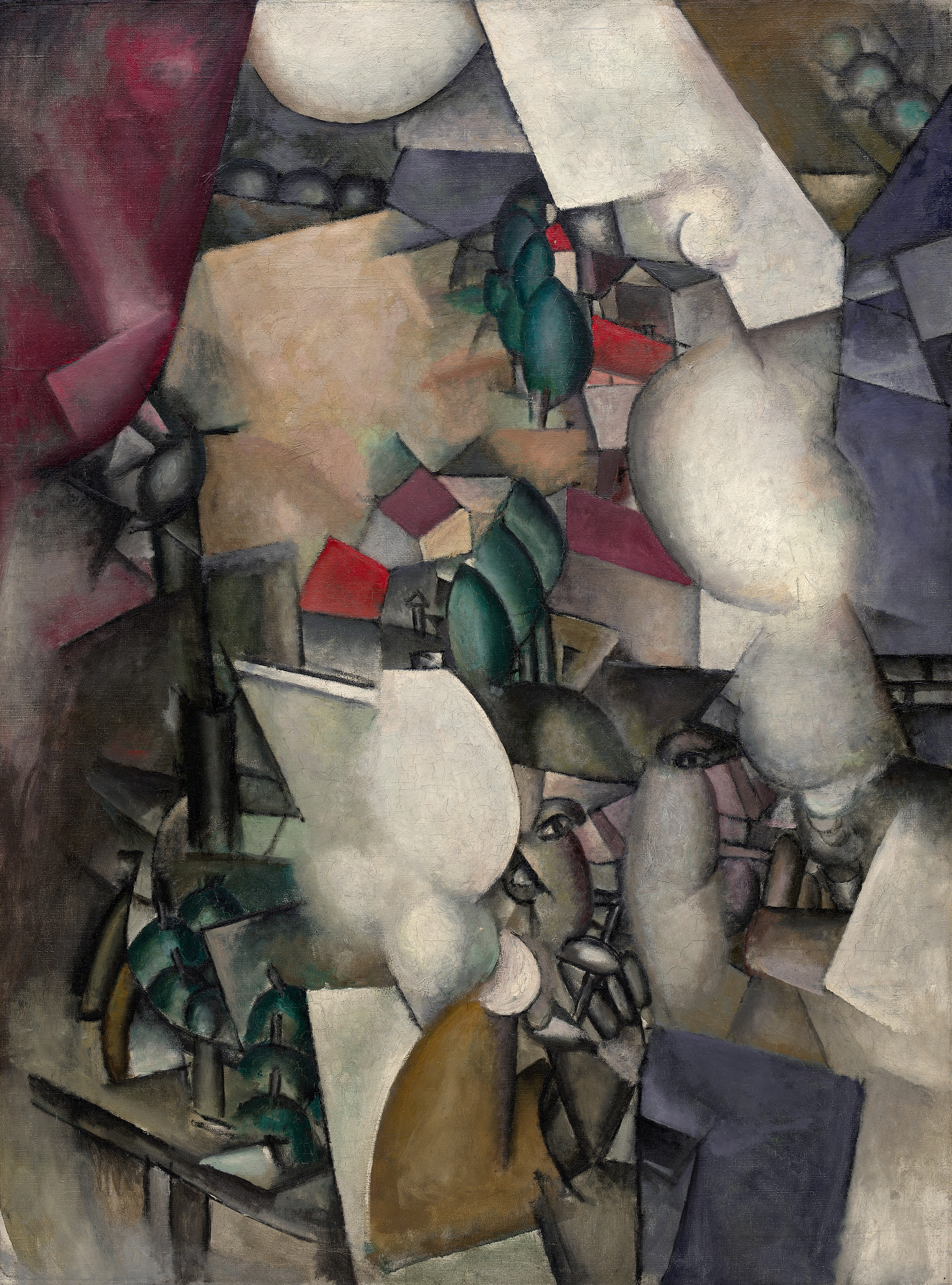
Fernand Léger, 1911–1912, Les Fumeurs (The Smokers), oil on canvas, 129.2 x 96.5 cm, Solomon R. Guggenheim Museum, New York

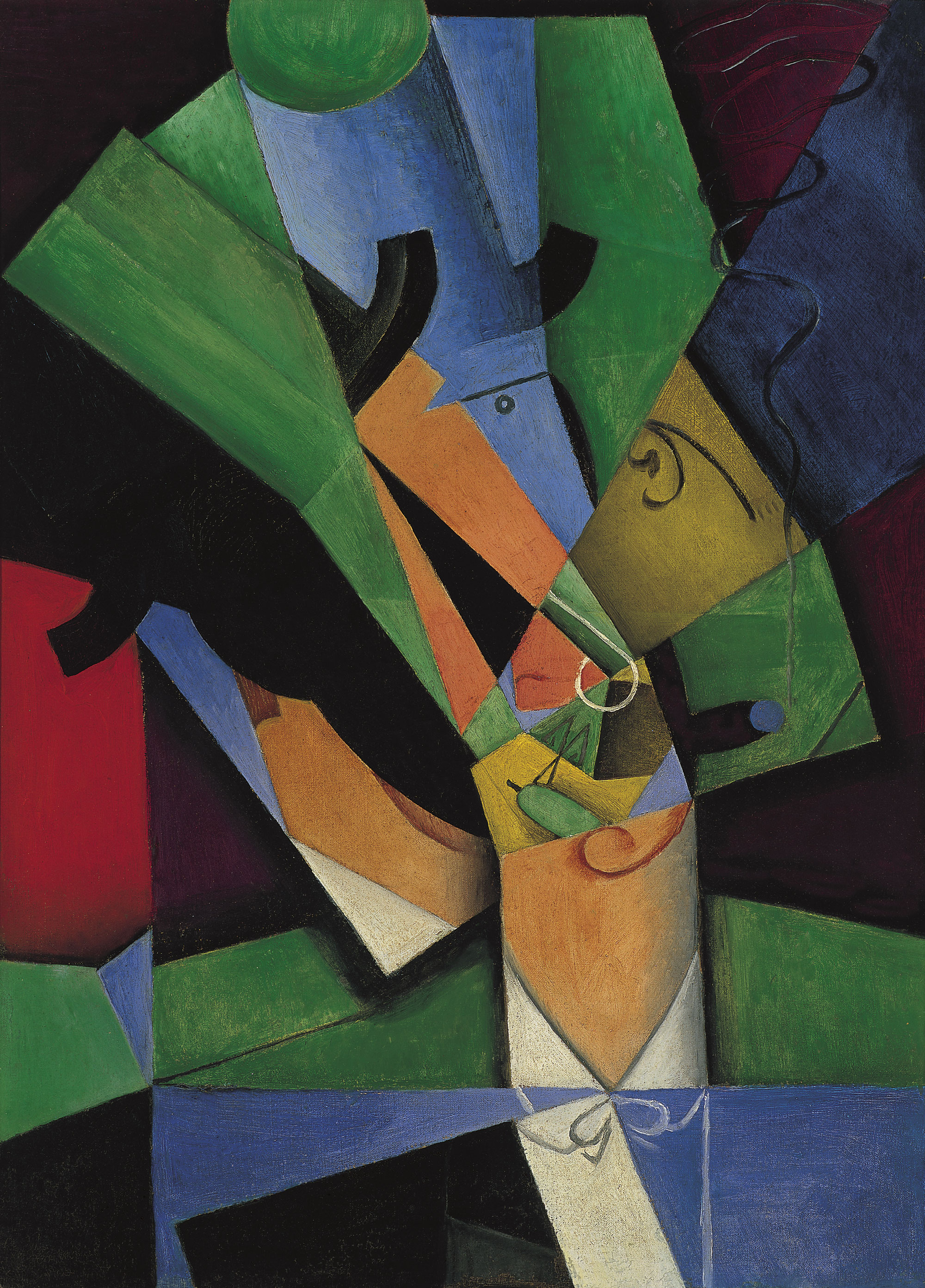
Juan Gris, 1913, El fumador, The Smoker (Frank Haviland), oil on canvas, 73 × 54 cm, Thyssen-Bornemisza Museum

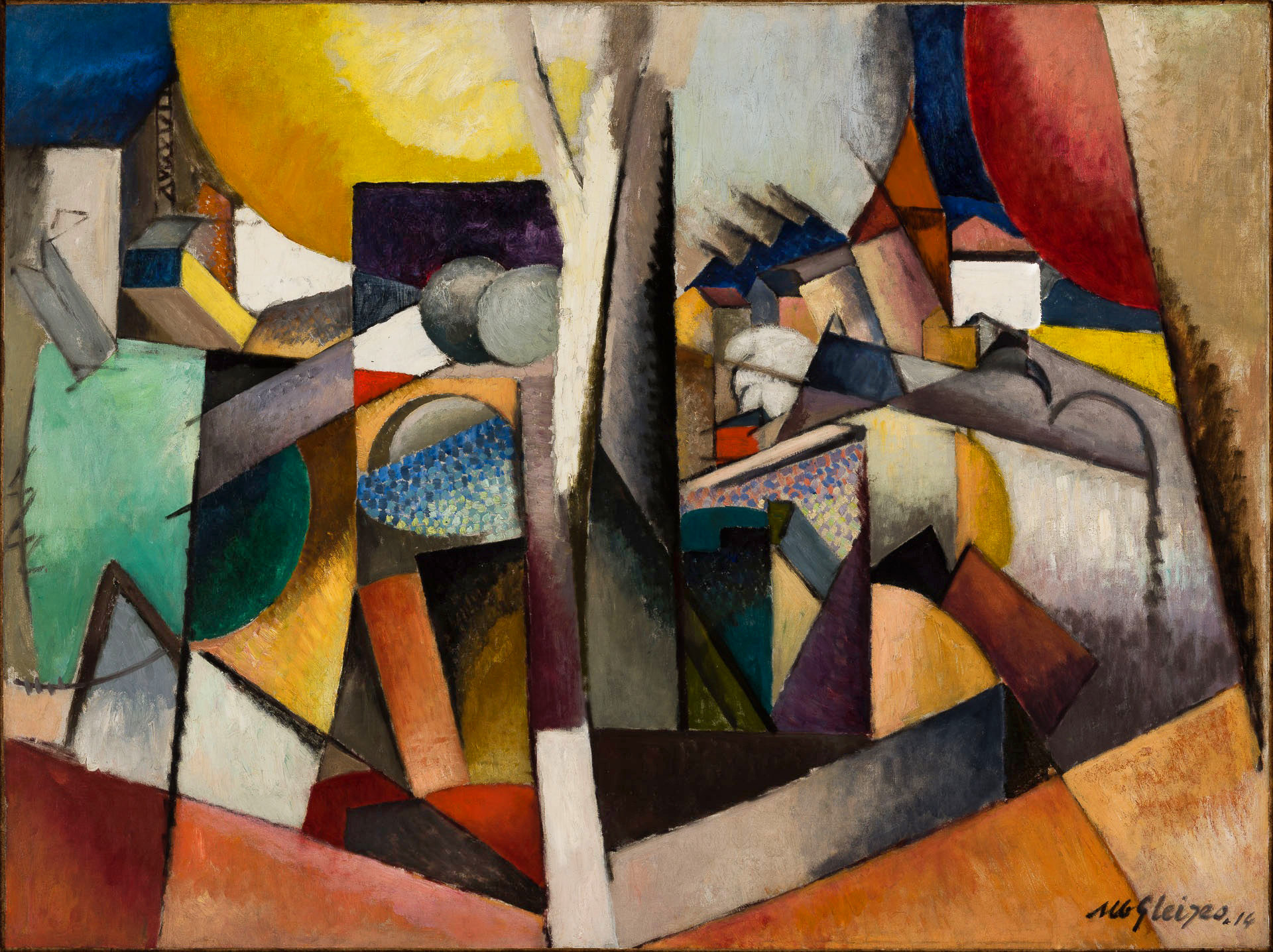
Albert Gleizes, 1914, Paysage Cubiste, oil on canvas, 97 x 130 cm, published in Der Sturm, 5 October 1920

== See also ==
- List of works by Jean Metzinger
