= Seated Woman on a Bench =

Sculpture by Willem de Kooning

- Artist: Willem de Kooning
- Year: 1972
- Type: Bronze
- Dimensions: 95.9 cm × 91 cm × 87.3 cm (37 3/4 in × 36 in × 34 3/8 in)
- Location: Hirshhorn Museum and Sculpture Garden; Washington, D.C.
- Owner: Smithsonian Institution

Seated Woman on a Bench is a bronze sculpture by Willem de Kooning. Modeled in 1972, it was cast in 1976. It is at the Hirshhorn Museum and Sculpture Garden, in Washington, D.C.

== See also ==
- List of public art in Washington, D.C., Ward 2
