= Clam digging =

Clam harvesting technique

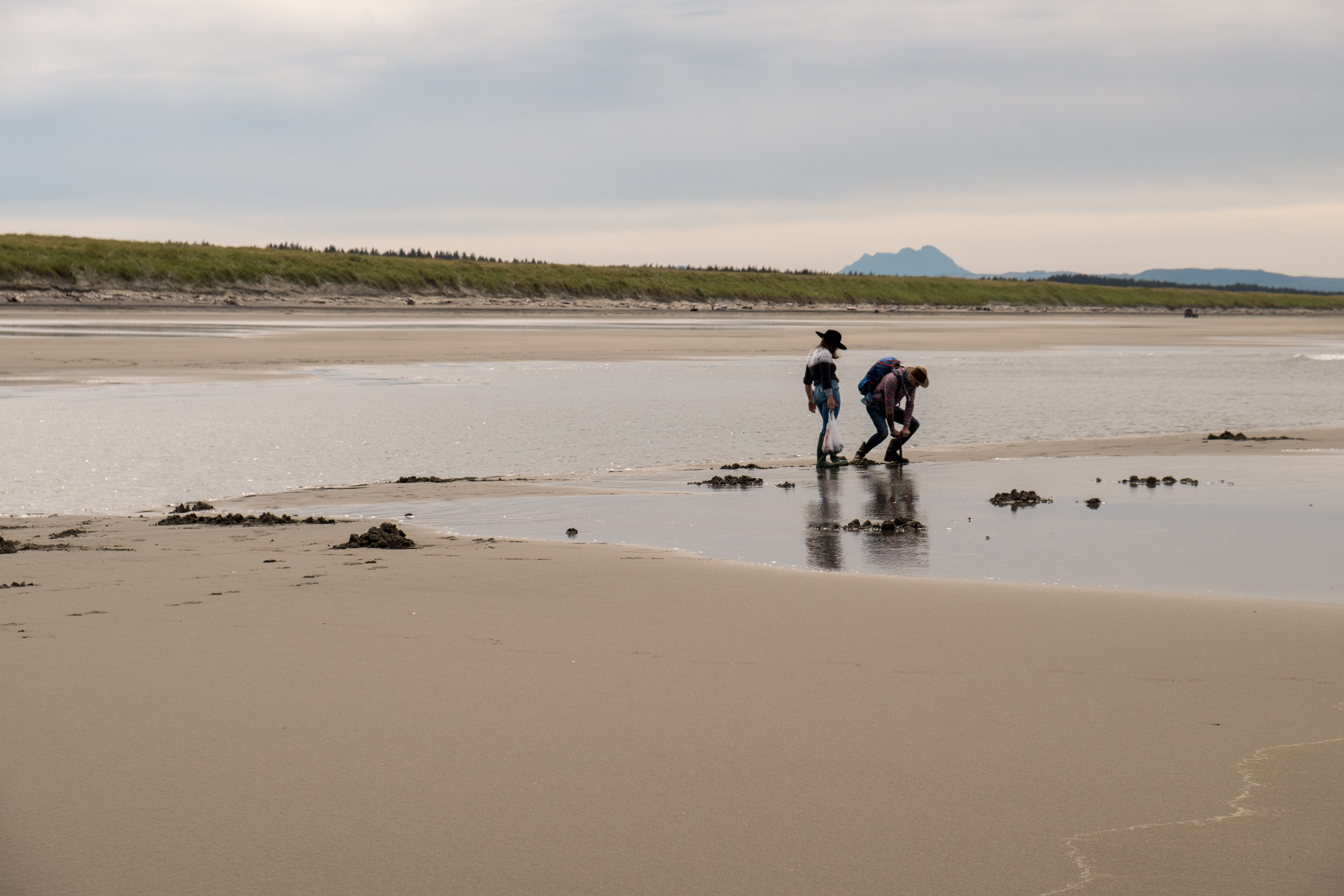
Two clammers on the Oregon Coast

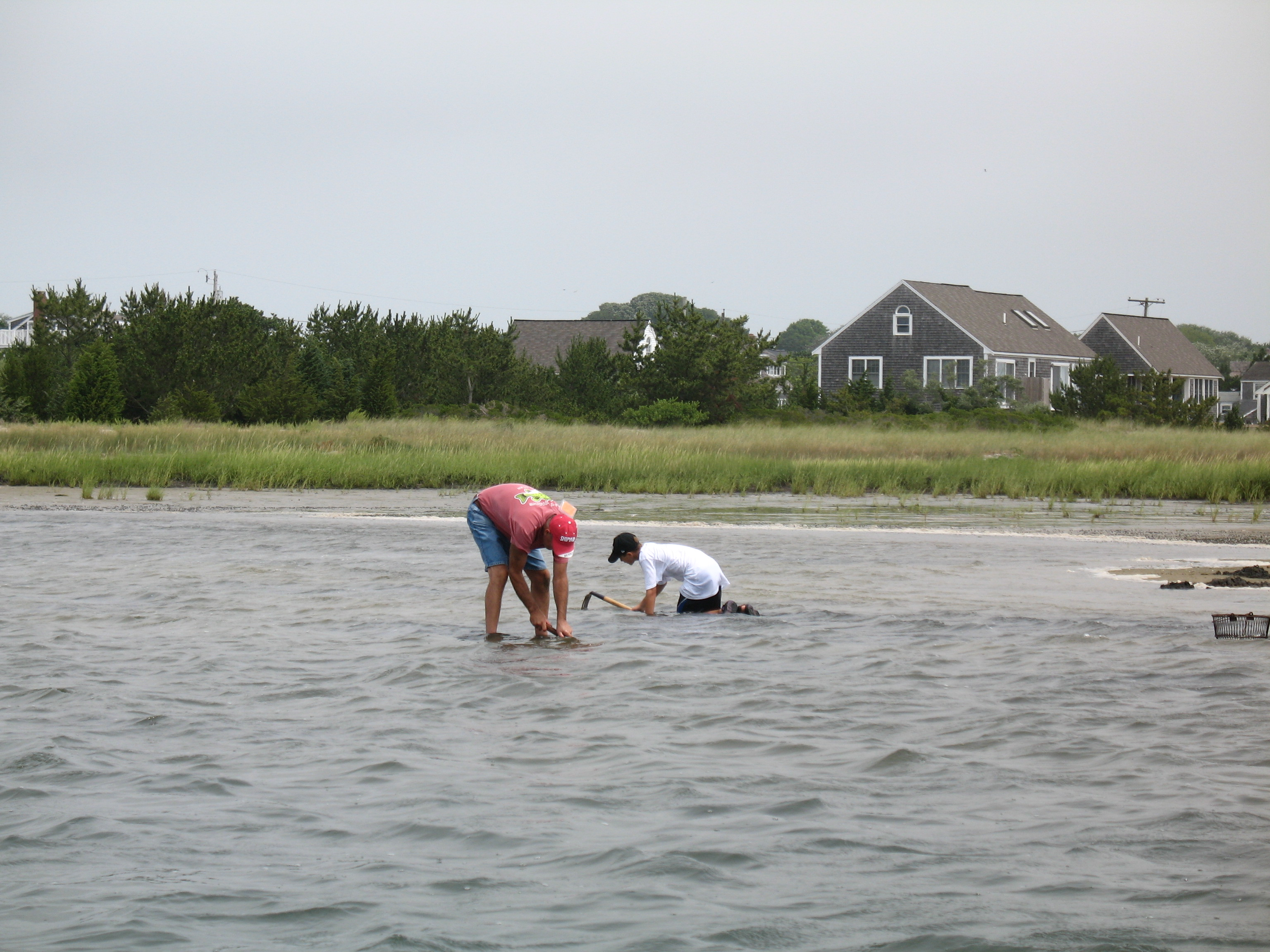
Two people digging for clams on Cape Cod, Massachusetts in 2008

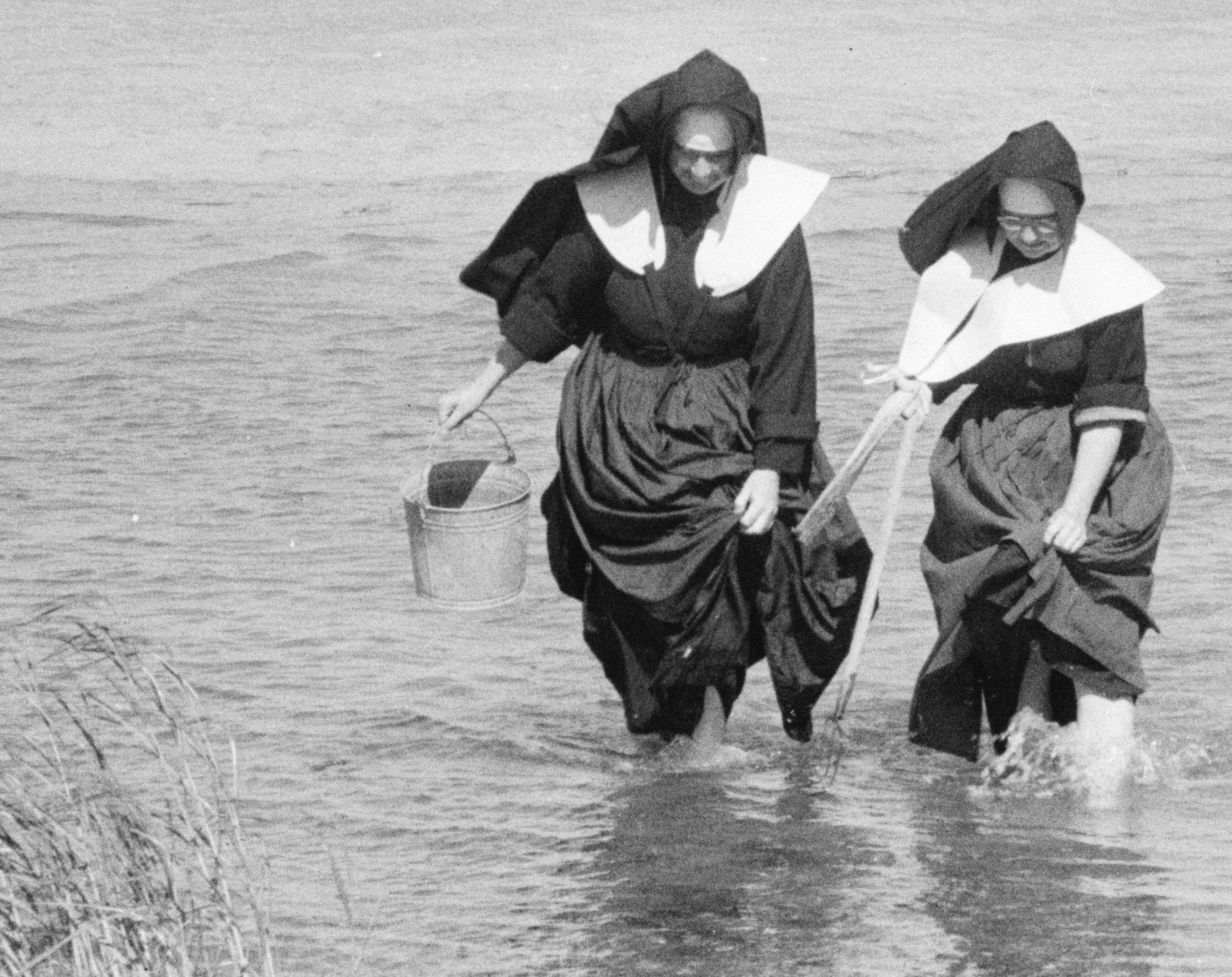
Clam digging on Long Island, 1957 (photo by Toni Frissell)

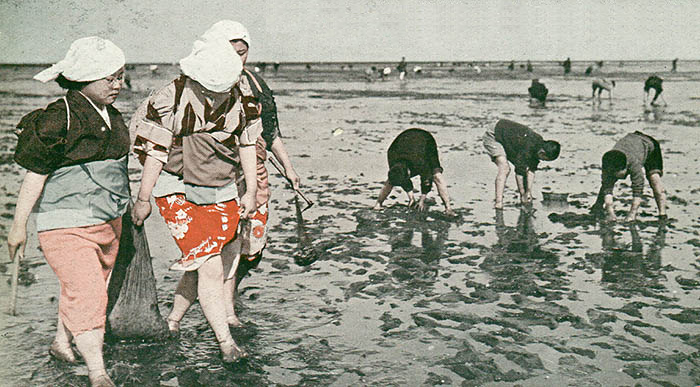
Clam digging in Haneda, 1937

Clam digging is the way to harvest clams (edible infaunal bivalve mollusks) from below the surface of the tidal sand flats or mudflats where they live, by digging. It is done both recreationally (for enjoyment or as a source of food) and commercially (as a source of income). Commercial digging in Canada and the United States is colloquially referred to as clamming, and is done by a clammer.

Native Americans on the Pacific coast have been harvesting clams for many years. Clams have been a historical food source tribes such as the Coos tribe.

== Methods ==
=== Recreational ===
Amateur clam digging is often done using a straight long-handled spading fork, or a spading shovel.

Digging for razor clams using a clam shovel or tube is a family and recreational activity in Oregon and Washington state.

In the Minas Basin area of Nova Scotia, digging for soft-shelled clams is usually done with a clam hack, a spading fork with its short handle bent perpendicularly away from the fork's head. A digger typically uses the hack by grasping the spine of the prongs in one hand and the handle of the fork in the other to push the hack down into the mud, clay, or sand and then pull it up and towards him/herself. This digging action opens up the substrate to expose the clams. Those clams legally long enough (44 mm or 1.7 in in Nova Scotia) are then taken by hand and put into a peck-size (9 litre) bucket that is used to measure the volume of clams collected.

Clam digging on the New England coast is done using a "clam hoe" (a pitchfork with the handle cut off about 18 in or 460 mm from the tines then bent about 70 degrees) and a "hod" or "roller" (a half bushel basket built using wood lathes or wire mesh) and hip waders (boot that extend up to the top of the legs). The use of other tools is prohibited in some areas.

Another popular method for bay clamming is the use of specialized tongs from a boat. Operators use the long tongs to probe the sand for clams. Clam tongs appear very much like two clam rakes with teeth hinged like scissors.

=== Commercial ===
Commercial clam digging for quahog clams, and the larger surf clams (soup clams) is primarily done offshore, via mechanical dredging. To harvest cultivated clam beds, aquaculturists often use a much smaller version (hand pulled) from the offshore dredge.

Another form of commercial clam digging is done from a flat-decked boat using a clam rake with a telescopic handle. The head of these rakes have long tines attached to a "basket-like" cage in which the clams are collected.

== Regulations ==
In Maine coastal towns and cities regulate digging clams in cooperation with the state Department of Marine Resources. Town clerks and city clerks issue recreational licenses for residents and nonresidents limiting digging to certain waters during certain times of the year.

Clamming in Oregon is regulated by type of clam, razor or bay. Razor clams in Oregon refers to the Pacific Razor clam (Siliqua patula) and is found on the sandy beaches all along the Oregon coast. Bay clams is a general term for all other clams and are typically found on the more protected beaches in the bay.

== See also ==
- Clamdigger, a sculpture by Willem de Kooning
- Clamdigger (train), a daily passenger train which ran along the Northeast Corridor during the 1970s
- Gathering seafood by hand
- Clam garden, another way Native Americans harvest clams
