= G. David Thompson =

American investment banker, industrialist, and modern art collector (1899 – 1965)

- Born: George David Thompson; March 20, 1899; Newark, Ohio, U.S.
- Died: June 26, 1965 (aged 66); Pittsburgh, Pennsylvania, U.S.
- Education: Carnegie Institute of Technology
- Occupations: Investment banker, industrialist, and art collector
- Spouse: Helene Thompson
- Children: 2

George David Thompson (March 20, 1899 – June 26, 1965) was an American investment banker, industrialist, and modern art collector, based in Pittsburgh. He started as a banker, but by 1945 was running four steel mills. In 1959, Pittsburgh's Carnegie Museum of Art rejected his offer of over 600 artworks, unwilling to build a gallery bearing his name, and he gradually sold much of his collection, including 88 works by Paul Klee and 70 by Alberto Giacometti, although he left the Carnegie Museum over 100 artworks when he died in 1965.

== Early life ==
George David Thompson was born in Newark, Ohio in 1899, and grew up in Indiana, going to high school in Peru, Indiana. He gave up on "a promising career as a singer", and instead obtained an engineering degree from the Carnegie Institute of Technology in 1920.

== Career ==
He worked in New York City as an investment banker. In 1933, Thompson became a financier, co-founding Thompson and Taylor, which took control of a number of steelmakers in the Great Depression, including the Pittsburgh Spring Steel Company and the Pittsburgh Steel Foundry Company. In 1945, he was in charge of four steel companies.

David Rockefeller called him, "a hard taskmaster and a tough negotiator". His reputation as a ruthless negotiator carried over into this art collecting. James Lord, in his biography of Alberto Giacometti, describes the canny and even underhanded ways in which Thompson procured works directly from the Swiss artist.

== Art collector ==
Le Fumeur by Jean Metzinger

Thompson made his first serious purchase, a Paul Klee painting, in 1928. By 1936, Thompson was acquiring canvases by Chagall, Utrillo, and Gromaire, and by the age of 60, Thompson had acquired at least 600 works of modern art, having already given Le Fumeur by Jean Metzinger to the Carnegie Museum of Art, Pittsburgh, Pennsylvania in 1953.

Thompson wanted his collection to stay in Pittsburgh. However, in 1959 Pittsburgh's Carnegie Museum of Art rejected his offer, which was on condition that a building bearing his name was constructed to house the collection. According to the Pittsburgh Quarterly, this "decision not to build a Thompson building clearly made Beyeler's fortune, and ironically, it is Beyeler who has a museum containing his collection and bearing his name in Basel, Switzerland." According to the Quarterly, which estimated his collection as being worth US$350 million in 2006, had the donation been accepted, then "the arts world of Pittsburgh would have been a different place".

In 1960, the Kunstsammlung Nordrhein-Westfalen in Düsseldorf was established with the purchase of 88 works by Paul Klee from Thompson's collection, brokered by Basel art dealer Ernst Beyeler. In the early 1960s, he sold his entire Alberto Giacometti collection of 70 works to Beyeler, and it was divided between the Kunsthaus Zürich, the Basel Kunstmuseum and the Kunstmuseum Winterthur.

In May 1961, New York's Solomon R. Guggenheim Museum held an exhibition entitled One Hundred Paintings from the G. David Thompson Collection, with works by Cézanne, Monet, Degas, Josef Albers, Adja Yunkers, Braque, Klee, Legér, Matisse, Miró, Mondrian, Schwitters, and Wols, with Picasso being the most represented, with 12 works.

Eventually Thompson gave the Carnegie Museum of Art more than 100 artworks, including paintings by Adolph Gottlieb, Josef Albers, Jean Dubuffet, Willem de Kooning, Alberto Burri, Jean Metzinger, Carlo Carrà, Francis Picabia, David Smith, Henry Moore, Marino Marini, Isamu Noguchi, Jean-Desiré-Gustave Courbet, Adolphe Monticelli, James Lambdin, David Blythe, and John Kane. He gave New York's Museum of Modern Art (MoMA) works by Claes Oldenburg, Victor Vasarely, Jules Olitski, Henry Moore, and Pablo Picasso's early masterpiece Two Nudes (1906). Thompson was elected a MoMA trustee in December 1960, having already served on MoMA's collections committee, and held both posts until his death.

After his death, Parke-Bernet Galleries in New York in March 1966 auctioned 90 paintings and 18 sculptures, in what they described as "beyond question the most important collection of 20th-century art ever to be offered at auction at one time".

== Personal life ==
Thompson and his wife, Helene, lived at Stone's Throw, 4554 Brownsville Road, in Whitehall in suburban Pittsburgh .

His son, G. David Thompson Jr., died in 1958, and two Henry Moore sculptures, one to Harvard University, the other to the Carnegie Museum of Art, were given in his memory. He donated works by Alberto Burri, Franz Kline, Robert Motherwell, Karel Appel, and Victor Vasarely in his honour.

Helene Thompson died in September 1982.
