= Police Gazette (painting) =

Painting by Willem de Kooning

- Artist: Willem de Kooning
- Year: 1955
- Dimensions: 110 cm × 127.5 cm (43 in × 50.2 in)
- Location: Private collection

Police Gazette is a 1955 abstract painting by Willem de Kooning, which is currently in a private collection.

== Painting style ==
Police Gazette is a landscape painted on canvas using abstract elements, and colors such as yellow, green and red. It is a painting with simple geometric forms, creating a contrast between the formal elements that compose the artwork. It was this painting that promoted Willem de Kooning amongst the most important contemporary abstract painters.

== History and price ==
Police Gazette was sold in 1965 for the first time for $37,000.

In 1973, the Swiss art dealer Ernst Beyeler paid US$180,000, setting a new record for the artist.

Since then, the painting went through the hands of known art collectors, such as Sidney Janis, Eugene V. Thaw and Mrs. Scull.

In 2006, it was bought by Steven A. Cohen for US$63.5 million.

== See also ==
- List of most expensive paintings
