= Woman III =

Painting by Willem de Kooning

- Artist: Willem de Kooning
- Year: 1953
- Medium: Oil on canvas
- Dimensions: 170 cm × 123 cm (68 in × 48.5 in)
- Location: Private collection of Steven A. Cohen

Woman III is a 1953 painting by abstract expressionist painter Willem de Kooning. It is one of a series of six Women paintings done by de Kooning in the early 1950s, which were first exhibited at the Sidney Janis gallery in 1953. Woman III measures 68 by 48 1/2 inches (1.73 by 1.23 m) and was completed that same year.

== Analysis ==
Woman III is notable within the series for its more muted palette of grays and whites. The body is outlined in arcs of black; the chest and arms are more voluminous than flat, as in other Women paintings. The features of Woman III's mask-like face are rendered. The figure stands apart from the background.

== Provenance ==
Acquired by Shahbanu Farah, the painting was part of the Tehran Museum of Contemporary Art collection from the late 1970s to 1994. After the Iranian Revolution in 1979, the painting could not be shown because of strict rules set by the new government about the visual arts and acceptable subject matter. Finally, in 1994, the painting was acquired by collector Thomas Ammann and subsequently traded to collector David Geffen for part of a 16th-century Persian manuscript, the Shahnameh of Shah Tahmasp.

In November 2006, the painting was sold by Geffen to billionaire Steven A. Cohen for $137.5 million. It is currently the fourteenth most expensive painting ever bought, and the only of de Kooning's early Woman series not held in a public collection.

== See also ==
- List of most expensive paintings
- Thomas Ammann
