= Clamdigger (de Kooning) =

Sculpture by Willem de Koning

Coordinates: 38.889111°N 77.023064°W

Clamdigger (1976)

Clamdigger is a bronze sculpture by Willem de Kooning. It may have been inspired by "the men who dug for clams along the beaches" near his home in East Hampton, New York. It has been described as one of his "extraordinarily tactile figurative sculptures" that "seemed pulled from the primordial ooze," and "as part man, part creature of the mud and the shallows."

The sculpture was modeled in clay in 1972, and cast in bronze in 1976. It was his "first large-scale bronze work."

As of 2014, Clamdigger is on display in the Hirshhorn Museum and Sculpture Garden.

De Kooning, known for his abstract expressionist paintings, took up sculpture later in his career, after a 1969 visit with a friend in Italy "who had a small foundry."

== See also ==
- List of public art in Washington, D.C., Ward 2
