= Woman I =

1950 painting by Willem de Kooning

- Artist: Willem de Kooning
- Year: 1950
- Medium: oil paint, canvas, metallic paint
- Movement: abstract expressionism
- Dimensions: 75.875 in (192.72 cm) × 58 in (150 cm)
- Location: Museum of Modern Art
- Accession: 478.1953
- Website: www.moma.org/collection/object.php?object_id=79810

Woman I is a 1950 abstract expressionist painting by American artist Willem de Kooning. The work is in the collection of the Museum of Modern Art, in New York.

== History ==
Willem de Kooning painted Woman I over two years, from 1950 to 1952. He executed numerous preliminary studies before beginning the painting, starting over several times.

Woman I is one of six canvases representing women, painted in a similar style.

Writing in the Guardian, Ben Eastham says: "Scandalous when first exhibited, the accusation that this cartoonish, charismatic and wild figure defames all womankind by its “monstrosity” seems now to rely on some mid-century assumptions about how women should be represented. Whatever you think about Woman I, she could never be mistaken for a submissive sex object or a Stepford wife."
