= Willem de Kooning =

Dutch-American abstract expressionist artist (1904–1997)

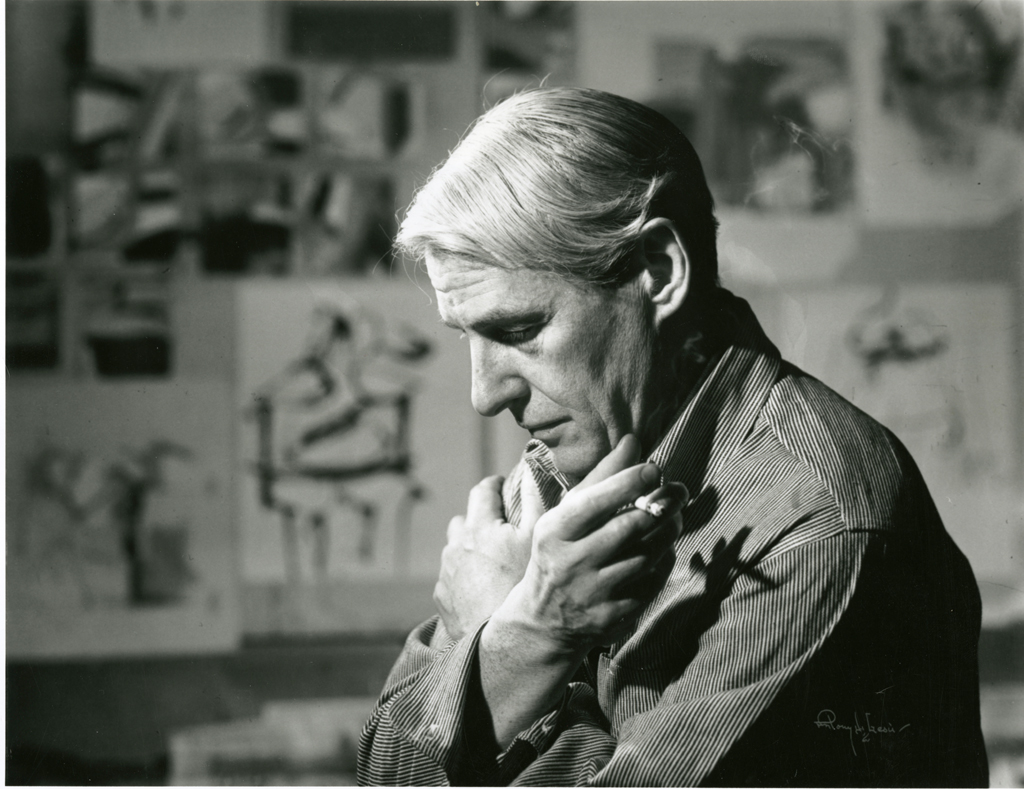
- De Kooning in his studio in 1961
- Born: April 24, 1904; Rotterdam, Netherlands
- Died: March 19, 1997 (aged 92); East Hampton, New York, U.S.
- Known for: Abstract expressionism
- Notable work: Woman I, Interchange, Easter Monday, Attic, Excavation
- Spouse: Elaine Fried (m. 1943; died 1989)
- Awards: Presidential Medal of Freedom (1964); Edward MacDowell Medal (1975); National Medal of Arts (1986); Praemium Imperiale (1989)

Signature
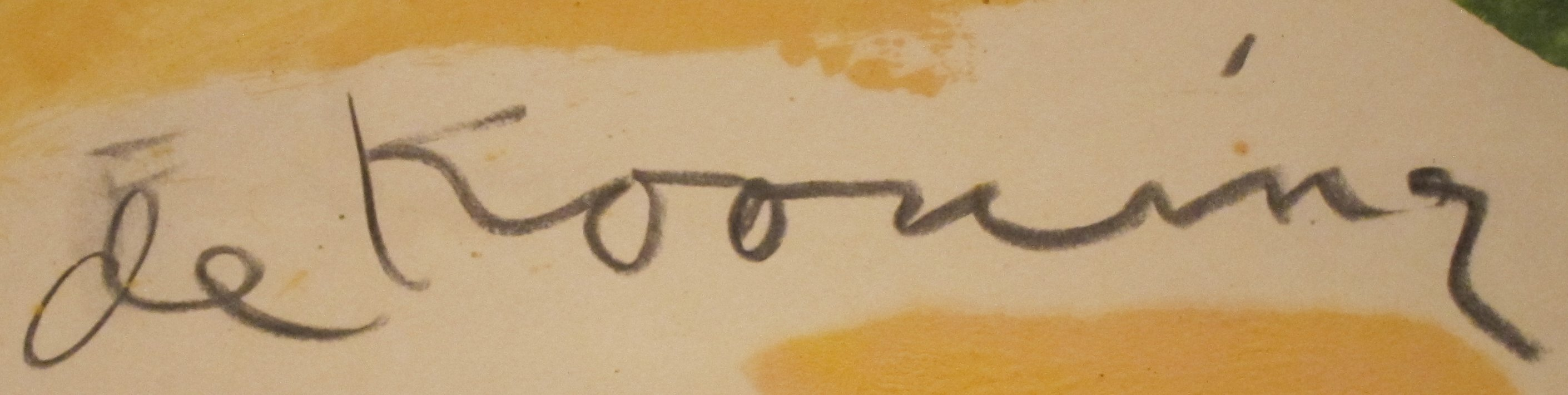

Willem de Kooning (/də ˈkuːnɪŋ/ də KOO-ning, Dutch: [ˈʋɪləm də ˈkoːnɪŋ]; April 24, 1904 – March 19, 1997) was a Dutch abstract expressionist artist. Born in Rotterdam, in the Netherlands, he moved to the United States in 1926, becoming a U.S. citizen in 1962. In 1943, he married painter Elaine Fried.

In the years after World War II, De Kooning painted in a style that came to be referred to as abstract expressionism or "action painting", and was part of a group of artists that came to be known as the New York School. Other painters in this group included Jackson Pollock, Elaine de Kooning, Lee Krasner, Franz Kline, Arshile Gorky, Mark Rothko, Hans Hofmann, John Ferren, Nell Blaine, Conrad Marca-Relli, James Brooks, Adolph Gottlieb, Jack Tworkov, Norman Lewis, Anne Ryan, Robert Motherwell, Philip Guston, Clyfford Still, and Richard Pousette-Dart. De Kooning's retrospective held at MoMA in 2011–2012 rendered him one of the best-known artists of the 20th century.

== Early life, family and education ==
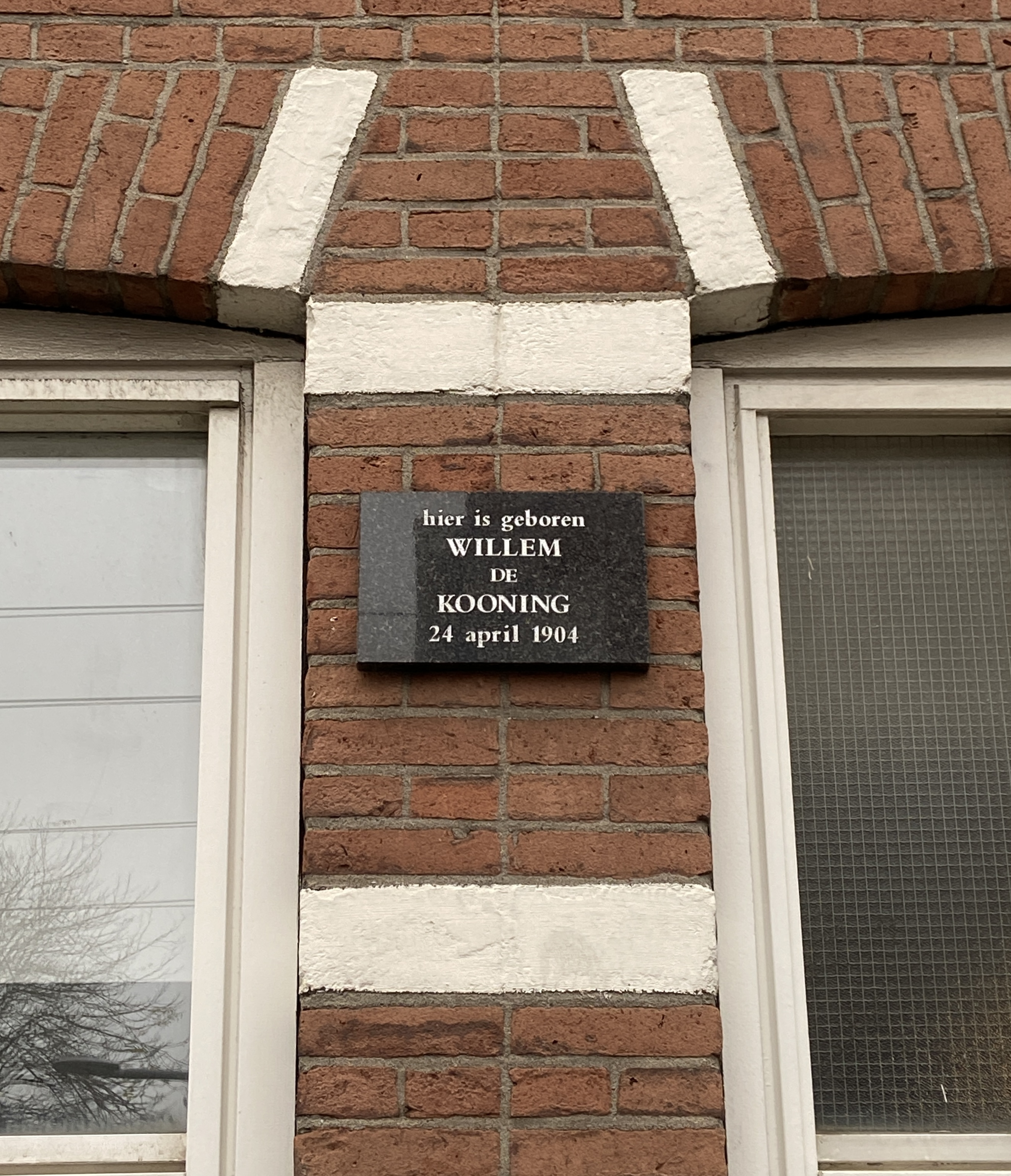
Plaque at De Kooning's birthplace in Rotterdam, Netherlands

Willem de Kooning was born in Rotterdam, the Netherlands, on April 24, 1904. His parents, Leendert de Kooning and Cornelia Nobel, were divorced in 1907, and De Kooning lived first with his father and then with his mother. He left school in 1916 and became an apprentice in a firm of commercial artists. Until 1924 he attended evening classes in Rotterdam at the Academie van Beeldende Kunsten en Technische Wetenschappen (Academy of Fine Arts and Applied Sciences)—later renamed the Willem de Kooning Academie.

== Career ==
In 1926, De Kooning traveled to the U.S. as a stowaway on the Shelley, a British freighter bound for Argentina, and on August 15 landed at Newport News, Virginia. He intended to become an illustrator of pulp magazines; he recalled in 1969 that "those American illustrators were the most inspiring artists to me!" He stayed at the Dutch Seamen's Home in Hoboken, New Jersey, and found work as a house painter. In 1927, he moved to Manhattan, New York City, where he had a studio on West Forty-fourth Street. He supported himself with jobs in carpentry, house painting and commercial art.

De Kooning began painting in his free time, and in 1928 he joined the art colony at Woodstock, New York. He also began to meet some of the modernist artists active in Manhattan. Among them were the American Stuart Davis, the Armenian Arshile Gorky and the Russian John Graham, whom De Kooning collectively called the "Three Musketeers". Gorky, whom De Kooning first met at the home of Misha Reznikoff, became a close friend and, for at least ten years, an important influence. Balcomb Greene said that "de Kooning virtually worshipped Gorky"; according to Aristodimos Kaldis, "Gorky was de Kooning's master". De Kooning's drawing Self-portrait with Imaginary Brother, from about 1938, may show him with Gorky; the pose of the figures is that of a photograph of Gorky with Peter Busa in about 1936.

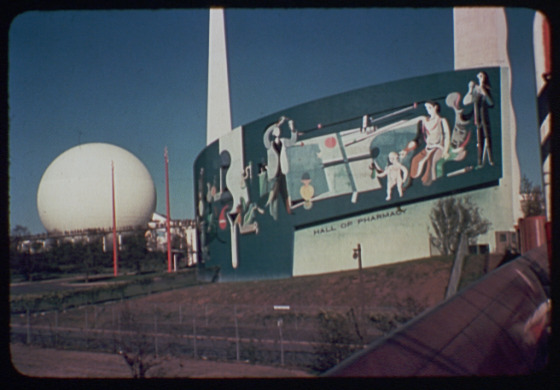
Mural by De Kooning at the Hall of Pharmacy, 1939 New York World's Fair

De Kooning joined the Artists Union in 1934, and in 1935 was employed in the Federal Art Project of the Works Progress Administration, for which he designed a number of murals including some for the Williamsburg Federal Housing Project in Brooklyn, New York City. None of them were executed, but a sketch for one was included in New Horizons in American Art at the Museum of Modern Art, his first group show. Starting in 1937, when De Kooning had to leave the Federal Art Project because he did not have U.S. citizenship, he began to work full-time as an artist, earning income from commissions and by giving lessons. That year, De Kooning was assigned to a portion of the mural Medicine for the Hall of Pharmacy at the 1939 World's Fair in New York, which drew the attention of critics, the images themselves so completely new and distinct from the era of American realism.

De Kooning worked on his first series of portrait paintings: standing or sedentary men, such as Two Men Standing, Man, and Seated Figure (Classic Male), even combining with self-portraits as with Portrait with Imaginary Brother (1938–39). At this time, De Kooning's work borrowed strongly from Gorky's surrealist imagery and was influenced by Picasso. This changed only when De Kooning met the younger painter Franz Kline, who was also working with the figurative style of American realism and had been drawn to monochrome. Kline, who died young, was one of De Kooning's closest artist friends. Kline's influence is evident in De Kooning's calligraphic black images of this period.

During the late 1940s and early '50s, De Kooning joined other fellow contemporary artists including Jackson Pollock and Franz Kline, in their struggle to break free from common artistic movements of the era including Cubism, Surrealism, and Regionalism. Their emotive gestures and abstract pieces were a result of their attempt to abandon the other movements. This movement was later called "Abstract Expressionism" a subdivision of which was sometimes known as "Action Painting" and the "New York School".

Between 1948 and 1953, De Kooning became more well known for his artistic techniques, but he tried not to repeat himself. In the late 1950s, De Kooning's work shifted away from the figurative work of the women (though he would return to that subject matter on occasion) and began to display an interest in more abstract, less representational imagery.

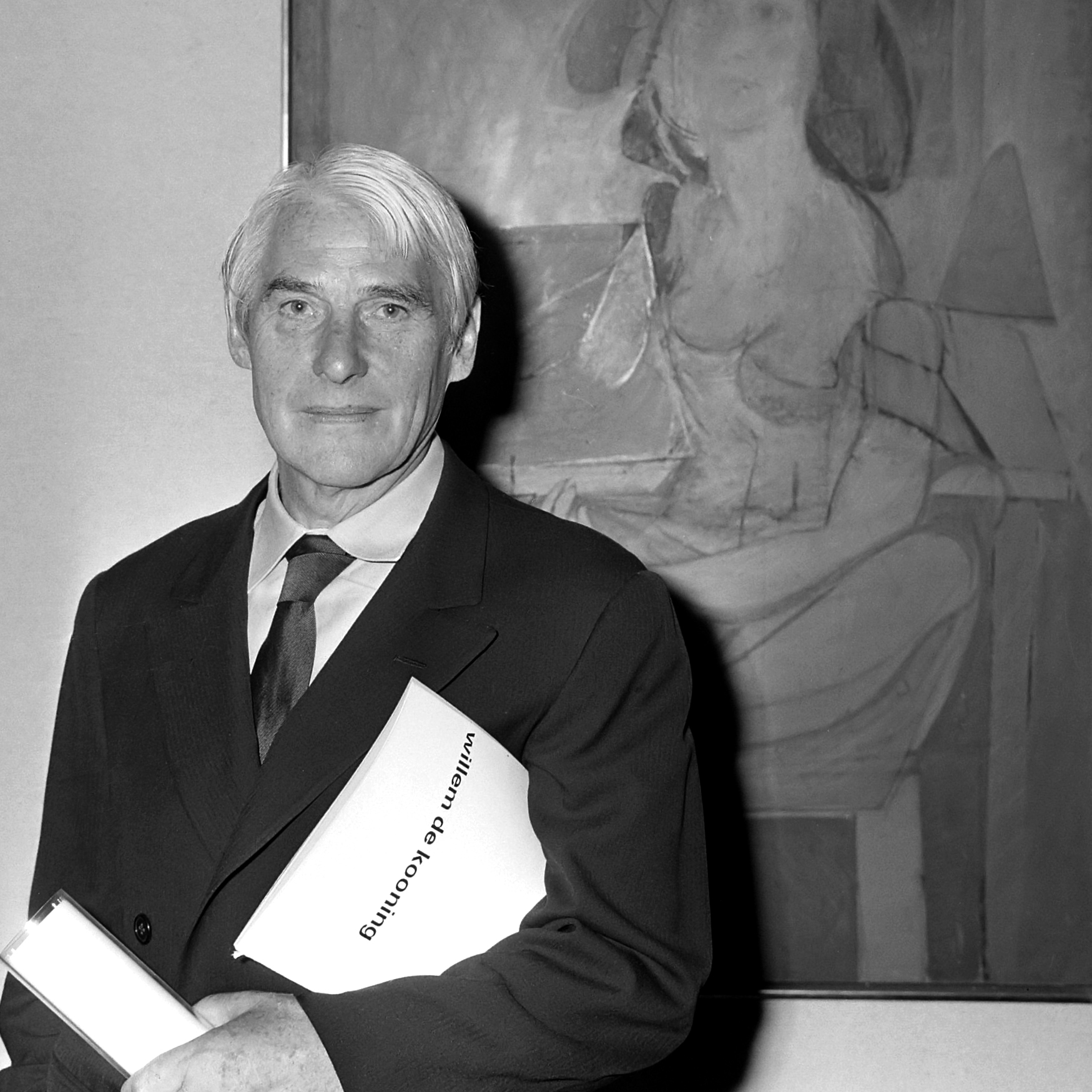
De Kooning in front of one of his works (Amsterdam, 1968)

== Work ==
=== Early work ===
De Kooning's paintings of the 1930s and early 1940s are abstract still-lifes characterised by geometric or biomorphic shapes and strong colours. They show the influence of his friends Davis, Gorky and Graham, but also of Arp, Joan Miró, Mondrian and Pablo Picasso. In the same years, De Kooning also painted a series of solitary male figures, either standing or seated, against undefined backgrounds; many of these are unfinished.

=== Black-and-white abstracts ===
By 1946, De Kooning had begun a series of black-and-white paintings, which he would continue into 1949. During this period, he had his first one-man show at the Charles Egan Gallery in New York City in 1948, consisting largely of black-and-white works, although a few pieces have passages of bright color. De Kooning's black paintings are important to the history of abstract expressionism owing to their densely impacted forms, their mixed media, and their technique.

Woman III (1953), private collection

=== The Woman series ===
De Kooning as sculptor: Seated Woman on a Bench, bronze of 1972 (cast 1976), in the Hirshhorn Museum and Sculpture Garden

De Kooning painted women regularly in the early and late 1940s, but it was not until 1950 that he began to explore the female subject exclusively. His well-known Woman series, begun in 1950 and culminating in Woman VI, owes much to Picasso, not least in the aggressive, penetrative breaking apart of the figure, and the spaces around it. Picasso's late works show signs that he, in turn, saw images of works by Pollock and De Kooning. De Kooning led the 1950s art world into a new movement known as American abstract expressionism. Critic Harold Rosenberg wrote ..."From 1940 to the present, Woman has manifested herself in De Kooning's paintings and drawings as at once the focus of desire, frustration, inner conflict, pleasure... and as posing problems of conception and handling as demanding as those of an engineer." The female figure is an important symbol for De Kooning's art career and his own life. The Woman painting is considered as a significant work of art for the museum through its historical context about the post-World War II history and American feminist movement. Additionally, the medium (oil, enamel, and charcoal on canvas) of this painting makes it different from others of De Kooning's time.

=== Notable works ===
Willem De Kooning is noted for his paintings: Woman III (1953), Woman VI (1953), Interchange (1955), and Police Gazette (1955). Some of his notable sculptures are Clamdigger (1972/1976) and Seated Woman on a Bench (1972/1976).

== Market reception ==
Some of De Kooning's paintings have been sold in the 21st century for record prices. In November 2006, the American business magnate David Geffen sold his oil painting Woman III to hedge fund manager Steven A. Cohen for $137.5 million, just below the record at the time of $140 million, which involved the same people in the same month for Jackson Pollock's No. 5, 1948. A month earlier Cohen had already paid Geffen $63.5 million for Police Gazette by De Kooning. In September 2015, Geffen sold De Kooning's oil painting Interchange to hedge-fund billionaire Ken Griffin for about $300 million, the highest price paid for a painting at the time. It held the record until November 15, 2017, when the Leonardo da Vinci Salvator Mundi sold for $450 million at Christie's in New York. In November 2016, Untitled XXV sold for $66.3 million at Christie's in New York. This was a record price for a De Kooning piece sold at public auction.

According to Patricia Failing:

By the end of the 1950s, in the opinion of many, the most influential painter at work for the world was the abstract expressionist master William de Kooning. Although it was 1948 before he was given his first one man show, De Kooning had previously acquired a formidable underground reputation which served to boost him to prominence, along with Jackson Pollock, as a leading exponent of "action painting".

== Solo exhibitions ==
The artist was featured in a number of solo exhibitions from 1948 to 1966, many in New York but also nationally and internationally. Specifically, he had 14 separate exhibitions, with two exhibitions per annum in the years 1953, 1964, and 1965. He was featured at the Egan Gallery, the Sidney Janis Gallery, the Museum of Fine Arts, Boston, the Arts Club of Chicago, the Martha Jackson Gallery, the Workshop Center, the Paul Kantor Gallery, the Hames Goodman Gallery, the Allan Stone Gallery, and the Smith College Museum of Art. Most of the exhibitions lasted for three weeks to one month.

In 2002, the Museum of Contemporary Art (MOCA), Los Angeles organized Willem de Kooning featuring 65 works on paper created between 1938 and 1955, curated by Paul Schimmel and Connie Butler. The works were shown at MOCA at February 10 – May 5, 2002, and also at the San Francisco Museum of Modern Art June 27 – September 8, 2002, and at the National Gallery of Art, Washington, D.C. September 29, 2002 – January 5, 2003.

More recent exhibitions of his work have included, De Kooning: Five Decades, which took place at the Mnuchin Gallery, New York City, from April 19 till June 15, 2019 and Willem De Kooning: Endless Painting at the Gagosian Gallery (curated by Cecilia Alemani) from April 15 to July 11, 2025 also in New York. Willem de Kooning at Work opened at the Rijksmuseum, Amsterdam on October 9, 2026 and will continue until January 17, 2027.

== Last works and death ==
It was revealed that, toward the end of his life, De Kooning had begun to lose his memory in the late 1980s and had been suffering from Alzheimer's disease for some time. This revelation has initiated considerable debate among scholars and critics about how responsible De Kooning was for the creation of his late work.

Succumbing to the progression of his disease, De Kooning painted his final works in 1991. He died in 1997 at age 92 and was cremated.

== Personal life ==
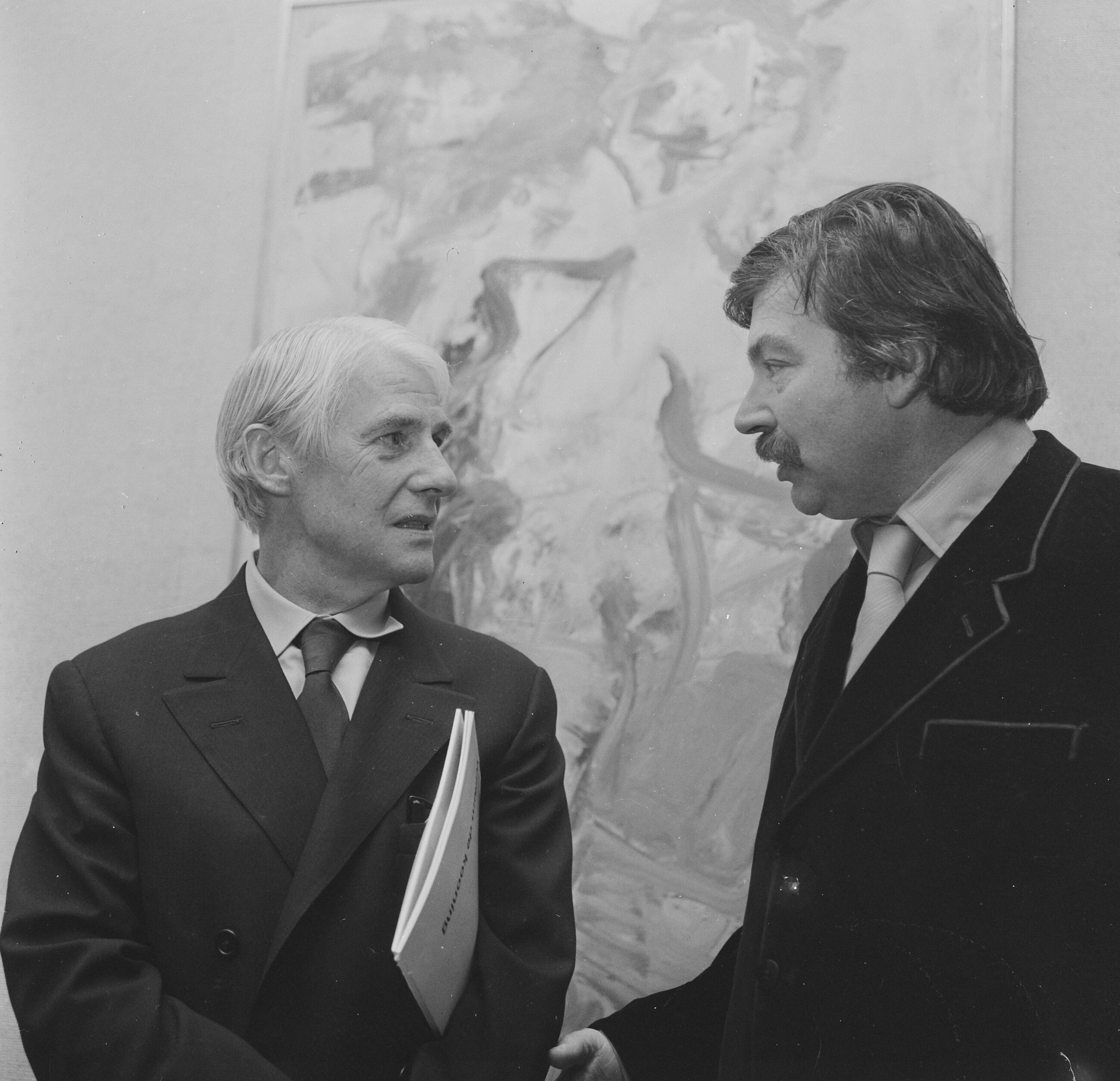
De Kooning (L) with Karel Appel (R) in front of one of his works (Amsterdam, 1968)

Willem de Kooning was born into poor circumstances in the working-class neighbourhood Oude Noorden in Rotterdam, but due to his international fame, he would eventually become a millionaire. He was a Dutch native speaker with a Rotterdam accent. When he left for the United States at the age of 22, he did not speak a word of English. Even later in his life, he never fully mastered the English language, and retained a strong Dutch accent throughout his life.

De Kooning met Elaine Fried at the American Artists School in New York; in 1938, her teacher introduced her to De Kooning at a Manhattan cafeteria when she was 20 years old and he was 34. Elaine had admired Willem's artwork before meeting him. After they met, he began to instruct her in drawing and painting. They painted in Willem's loft at 143 West 21st Street, and he was known for his harsh criticism of her work, "sternly requiring that she draw and redraw a figure or still life and insisting on fine, accurate, clear linear definition supported by precisely modulated shading." He destroyed many of her drawings, but this "impelled Elaine to strive for both precision and grace in her work". When they married December 9, 1943, she moved into his loft and they continued sharing studio spaces. Their lifelong partnership involved alcoholism, money problems, love affairs, quarrels, and separations.

Elaine and Willem de Kooning had what was later called an open marriage; they both were casual about sex and about each other's affairs. Elaine had affairs with men who helped further Willem's career, such as Harold Rosenberg, who was a renowned art critic; Thomas B. Hess, who was a writer about art and managing editor for ARTnews; and Charles Egan, owner of the Charles Egan Gallery. Willem had a daughter, Lisa de Kooning, in 1956, as a result of his affair with Joan Ward. He also had a romance with Ruth Kligman after her affair with Jackson Pollock ended upon his death in a 1956 car crash.

Elaine and Willem both struggled with alcoholism, which eventually led to their separation in 1957. While separated, Elaine remained in New York, struggling with poverty, and Willem moved to Long Island and dealt with depression. Despite bouts with alcoholism, they both continued painting. He became a U.S. citizen on March 13, 1962, and in the following year moved from Broadway to East Hampton, New York, into a house that Elaine's brother Peter Fried had sold to him two years before. He built a studio nearby and lived in the house for the remainder of his life. Although Elaine and Willem were separated for nearly twenty years, they never divorced, and ultimately reunited in 1976.

== See also ==
- American Figurative Expressionism
- Erased de Kooning Drawing
- Impasto
- New York Figurative Expressionism
