= Sidney Janis =

American fashion designer (1896–1989)

- Born: July 8, 1896; Buffalo, New York, US
- Died: November 23, 1989 (aged 93); New York City, US
- Occupations: Art dealer, writer
- Years active: 1948–1986
- Organization: The Sidney Janis Gallery
- Spouse: Harriet (Hansi) Grossman
- Children: 3, including Conrad Janis

Sidney Janis (July 8, 1896 – November 23, 1989) was a wealthy clothing manufacturer and art collector who opened an art gallery in New York City in 1948. His gallery quickly gained prominence, for he not only exhibited work by the Abstract Expressionists, but also European artists such as Pierre Bonnard, Paul Klee, Joan Miró, and Piet Mondrian.

As critic Clement Greenberg explained in a 1958 tribute to Janis, the dealer's exhibition practices had helped to establish the legitimacy of the Americans, for his policy "not only implied, it declared, that Jackson Pollock, Willem de Kooning, Franz Kline, Phillip Guston, Mark Rothko, and Robert Motherwell were to be judged by the same standards as Matisse and Picasso, without condescension, without making allowances." Greenberg observed that in the late 1940s "the real issue was whether ambitious artists could live in this country by what they did ambitiously. Sidney Janis helped as much as anyone to see that it was decided affirmatively."

== Biography ==
=== Early life ===
Sidney Janis was born in 1896 in Buffalo, New York, one of five children of a traveling salesman. A talented ballroom dancer, he left public high school in his senior year to travel on the eastern vaudeville circuit. Janis joined the Naval Reserve in 1917 and took courses to complete his high school diploma. After his discharge, he returned to Buffalo to work with an older brother who had a chain of shoe stores. On his frequent trips to New York City, he met, courted, and in 1925 married Harriet Grossman, a writer passionate about music and the visual arts. Sidney and Harriet Janis visited as many art shows as they could. Sidney later maintained that visual experience was more important than schooling in developing an understanding and appreciation of art and the artist. His older brother Martin was an art critic for the Buffalo Courier-Express and later in 1954 opened the Martin Janis Gallery in Los Angeles.

=== Collecting ===
In the mid-1920s, Sidney Janis opened his own shirt company, M'Lord. Its signature item was a two-pocket, short-sleeved shirt that he designed. As the business grew and prospered, so did the Janises' passion for collecting art. The couple made annual trips to Paris, where they met Mondrian, Picasso, Léger, Brâncuși, and other masters. By the early 1930s, they had acquired major works by Picasso, Matisse, De Chirico, Dalí, Mondrian, and the self-taught master Henri Rousseau. In New York, Sidney and Harriet Janis became friends with Arshile Gorky, Frederick Kiesler, and Marcel Duchamp, all of whom often visited their apartment.

=== Career in art ===
In 1934, Janis was invited to join the Advisory Board of the Museum of Modern Art. The following year, nineteen paintings from his private collection were shown at MoMA, and in 1936 they were exhibited at the Brooklyn Museum. In 1939, as Chairman of MoMA's Art Committee, Janis helped arrange the loan of Picasso's Guernica to New York for the benefit of Spanish Refugee Relief. Sidney Janis closed the shirt business to devote his time to writing on art in 1939. He collaborated with his wife Harriet on books such as Abstract and Surrealist Art in America in which he explores the burgeoning styles of art rarely before discussed in America. The work exhibits a wide array of artists who were successful in conveying the surrealist and abstract styles such as Georgia O'Keeffe, Arthur B. Carles, Man Ray, Leon Kelly, Mark Rothko, and Ray Eames.

== The Sidney Janis Gallery ==
Then, in 1948, when Janis was 52 years old, he and Harriet opened the Sidney Janis Gallery which was located at 15 E. 57th Street in Manhattan sharing the fourth floor with the Betty Parsons Gallery. The gallery soon acquired a strong reputation by mounting scholarly, curated exhibitions of Léger, Mondrian, the Fauves, the Futurists, and de Stijl artists.

During the 1950s, the gallery became a powerhouse of contemporary avant-garde art. In 1952, Janis gave Jackson Pollock the first of three solo shows. The gallery represented Arshile Gorky, Willem de Kooning, Franz Kline, Mark Rothko, Robert Motherwell, Phillip Guston, Adolph Gottlieb, William Baziotes, and Josef Albers. In addition to his promotion of the Abstract Expressionists, Janis become the first blue chip gallery to show Pop art. In the fall of 1962 he organized the groundbreaking exhibition, the International Exhibition of the New Realists, a survey of contemporary Pop art and the seemingly related Nouveau Réalisme movement. The exhibition was located in a temporary rented storefront at 19 W. 57th Street. Robert Motherwell, Mark Rothko, Phillip Guston and Adolph Gottlieb left the gallery as a protest. The Sidney Janis Gallery soon became a leading exhibitor and dealer in Pop art, representing Claes Oldenburg, Jim Dine, Tom Wesselmann, George Segal, Öyvind Fahlström, and Marisol.

By placing the new work in the context of great modern art, Sidney Janis focused critical eyes on contemporary art in a different, brilliant and discriminating way. He continued throughout to show Giacometti, Mondrian (whose estate he acquired), Arp, Magritte, Dubuffet, Duchamp, Léger, and Picasso, interspersing these exhibitions with solo shows and group shows of trend-setting contemporary artists .

As a collector, Sidney Janis had an unparalleled eye. In 1967, he donated 103 works from his collection to the Museum of Modern Art, including six late Mondrian oils, Boccioni's Dynamism of a Football Player, and Picasso's Artist and Model. MoMA's founding director, Alfred Barr, declared that this donation was "unequaled among the great gifts" the museum had received. The gallery moved in the 1980s to 110 W. 57th Street. In 1984, the French Government awarded Mr. Janis its highest honor for distinguished contribution to cultural life, Commandeur de l'Ordre des Arts et des Lettres. He received the New York Mayor's Award of Honor for Arts and Culture in 1987.

Sidney Janis remained active at the gallery through his later years, organizing the unique Mondrian + Brâncuși exhibition in 1982, when he was 86 years old. He died at the age of 93 in New York in late 1989. The gallery continued under the direction of Janis' son Carroll and grandson David Janis. In the final decade of the century, the Janis Gallery continued to mount significant exhibitions, including "Mondrian: Flowers" a rare gathering of an extensive group of floral images by the seminal abstract artist.

== Impact in Art ==
During his lifetime, Janis continually sought to support art and creativity and create exposure for artists of his day even if they had not yet garnered the attention and adoration of the public. When talking about minimalist artists, he said that they had vision beyond their time and were part of an important movement in art. Using El Greco and his contemporaries as an example, Janis stated that his "painting seemed so distorted to his contemporaries it was hidden away in convents and not appreciated until the late 19th Century."

In addition to his donation to the Museum of Modern Art, Janis collected art throughout his lifetime and set up exhibitions that put the contemporary art of his time on the stage. For example, he had several accomplishments in the American art scene, including the first exhibition of Futurism, an exhibition of Analytical Cubism, and the "Less is More" show.
