= David Geffen =

American media proprietor (born 1943)

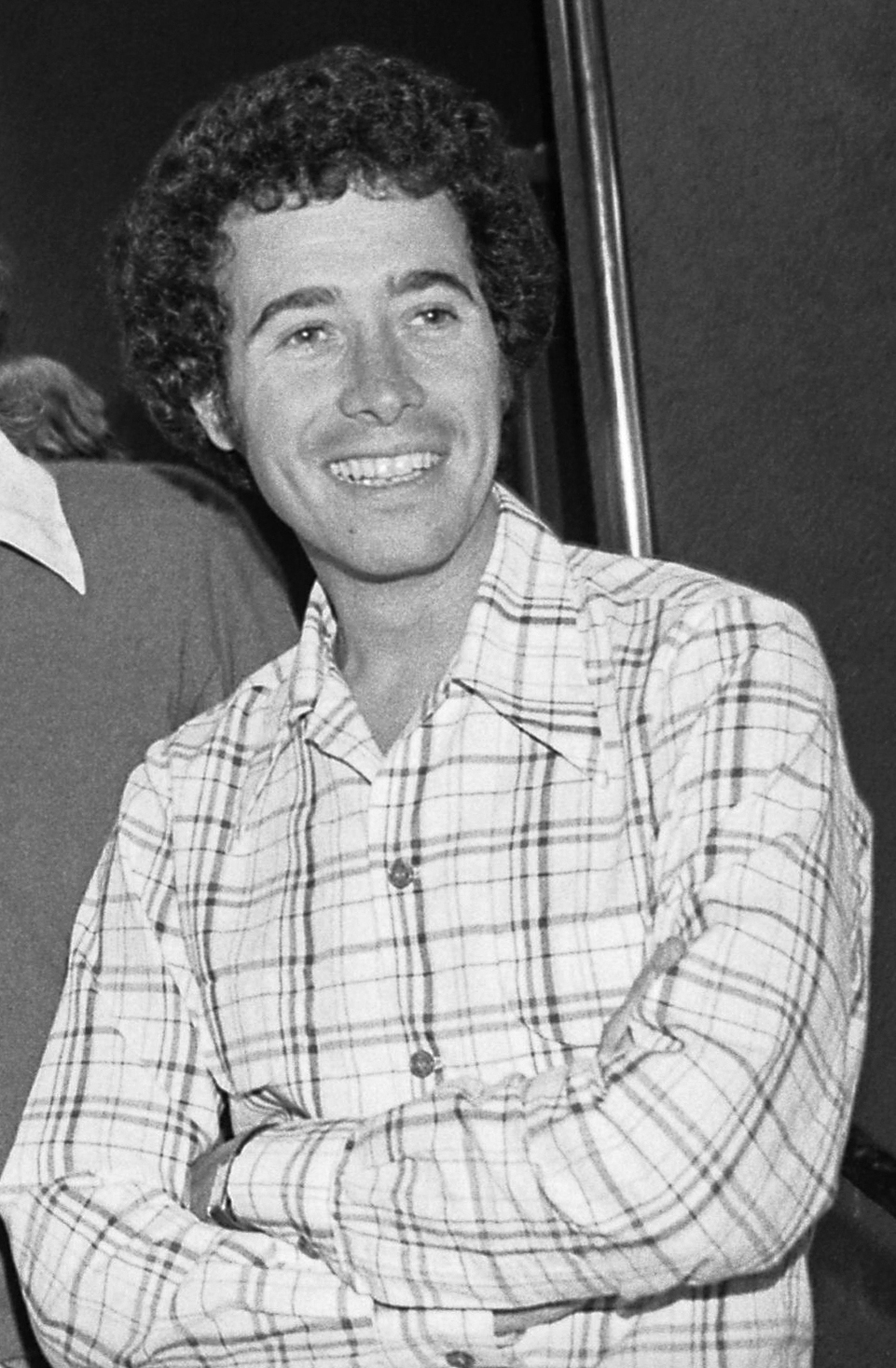
- Geffen in 1973
- Born: David Lawrence Geffen; February 21, 1943 (age 83); New York City, U.S.
- Occupations: Entrepreneur; record executive; film producer; media proprietor
- Title: Founder of: DreamWorks SKG; DreamWorks Records; Asylum Records; Geffen Records; Geffen Pictures; DGC Records
- Spouse: Donovan Michaels (m. 2023; div. 2026)

David Lawrence Geffen (born February 21, 1943) is an American film producer, record executive, media proprietor, and philanthropist. In music, he co-founded Asylum Records with Elliot Roberts in 1971 before founding Geffen Records in 1980, DGC Records in 1990, and co-founding DreamWorks Records (with Mo Ostin, Michael Ostin and Lenny Waronker) in 1996. In film, he founded the Geffen Film Company in 1982 and co-founded DreamWorks SKG with Steven Spielberg and Jeffrey Katzenberg in 1994.

According to Forbes, Geffen is the wealthiest person in the global entertainment industry; he has an estimated net worth of US$9 billion as of 2024.

== Early life and education ==
David Geffen was born in Borough Park, Brooklyn, New York City, to Abraham Geffen (1903–1961) and Batya Volovskaya (1909–1988). Geffen's mother owned a clothing store in Borough Park called Chic Corsets by Geffen. Both of his parents were Jewish immigrants who met in Mandatory Palestine and then moved to the United States. His older brother Mitchell (born Mischa) Geffen (1933–2006) was an attorney who attended UCLA Law School and later settled in Encino, California.

Geffen graduated from Brooklyn's New Utrecht High School in 1960 with a "barely passing 66 average". He attended the University of Texas at Austin for a semester, and then Brooklyn College, before again dropping out. He then moved to Los Angeles, California to find his way in the entertainment business. He attended Santa Monica College (then known as Santa Monica City College) in Santa Monica, California, but soon left. Geffen attributed his challenges in school to dyslexia.

== Business career ==
After a brief appearance as an extra in the 1961 film The Explosive Generation, Geffen began his entertainment career in 1964 as a mailroom clerk at the William Morris Agency (WMA), where he quickly became a talent agent. He learned about showbiz politics while reading the memos he delivered between agents. In order to obtain the talent agent job, he had to prove he was a college graduate. As he later reported in an interview, he claimed in his job application at WMA that he had graduated from the University of California at Los Angeles (UCLA). Because he worked in the mailroom, Geffen was able to intercept a letter from UCLA to WMA which stated that he had not graduated from UCLA. He modified the letter to show that he had attended and graduated, then submitted it to WMA. His colleagues in the mailroom included Elliot Roberts, who later became Geffen's partner at Asylum Records.

In 1968, Geffen left WMA and became a talent agent for Ashley-Famous Agency. In 1969, he was executive vice president and talent agent for Creative Management Associates. At this time he also started working as a personal manager and was immediately successful with Laura Nyro and Crosby, Stills & Nash.

When Geffen was engaged in the process of looking for a record deal for young Jackson Browne, Atlantic Records founder Ahmet Ertegun suggested that Geffen start his own record label.

=== Asylum Records ===
Geffen co-founded Asylum Records in 1971 with Elliot Roberts after Geffen was unable to get Jackson Browne a record deal anywhere else. The name Asylum was chosen because of the owners' reputations for signing artists who would struggle to find a record company that would contract with them. The label was distributed by Atlantic Records at this time. Asylum became a generator of the Southern California folk-rock sound and signed artists such as the Eagles, Joni Mitchell, Bob Dylan, Tom Waits, Linda Ronstadt, Warren Zevon, Judee Sill, and JD Souther. Later in the 1970s Geffen left Asylum, which was later acquired by Atlantic's parent company, Warner Communications, and merged with Elektra Records in 1982 to become Elektra/Asylum Records. The label was revived in 2004 as an urban music operation, signing hip-hop artists such as Waka Flocka Flame, Cam’ron, Gucci Mane, Paul Wall, Mike Jones and Bun B.

Geffen remained in charge until December 1975, when he went to work as vice chairman of Warner Bros. film studios. He then retired and in 1977 was informed (erroneously) that he had cancer. During his retirement period he spent a short time (the fall of 1978 and spring of 1979) teaching a noncredit seminar on the music industry and arts management at Yale University, where he featured classroom guests Jackson Browne and Paul Simon. In 1980 a new medical diagnosis revealed the error in the original diagnosis and Geffen was given a clean bill of health, whereupon he decided to return to working in the entertainment industry.

=== Geffen Records ===
In 1980, he founded his eponymous record label and recruited Warner Bros. Records executive Ed Rosenblatt as president. The Geffen label's meteoric rise to prominence within the year proved a bittersweet success. Geffen's first artist to sign on was Donna Summer, who was anxious to leave Casablanca/PolyGram Records. Geffen shortly after released her The Wanderer album, the lead single of which reached No. 3 on the Billboard Hot 100, and the album certified gold. Casablanca countered by releasing more singles off her 1979 Bad Girls album such as the song Walk Away and a similarly named hits compilation to compete, but by then New Wave sound was dominating the airwaves.

The November 1980 release of John Lennon's album Double Fantasy seems an impressive feat for a new label, but at the time Lennon stated that Geffen was the only one with enough confidence in him to agree to a deal without hearing the record first. Yoko Ono, Lennon's wife and partner, stated that Geffen was the only label head to pay attention to her. In December 1980, Lennon was murdered and Double Fantasy became a massive seller. Over the years, Geffen Records/DGC has released recordings by artists such as Olivia Newton-John, Asia, Siouxsie and the Banshees, Elton John, Cher, Sonic Youth, Aerosmith, Whitesnake, XTC, Peter Gabriel, Weezer, Lone Justice, Blink-182, Guns N' Roses, Nirvana, Lifehouse, Tyketto, Pat Metheny, Sloan, the Stone Roses and Neil Young.

The label had been distributed by Warner Bros. Records since its inception, but in 1990 the label was sold to MCA Records, with Geffen receiving shares in MCA worth $550 million. A year later, Matsushita Electric acquired MCA and paid Geffen $670 million. Geffen continued to run the label before leaving Geffen Records in 1995. In late 1996 after being sold to Seagram, MCA reincorporated into its subsidiary name, Universal Studios, Inc., while MCA Music Entertainment was renamed Universal Music Group. The Geffen label was restructured under the recently renamed company. On December 10, 1998, Seagram acquired PolyGram for $10.6 billion; the latter's music division was merged into UMG, thus, on New Year's Day 1999, Geffen Records was merged with its sister label, Interscope Records, and PolyGram subsidiary, A&M Records, to become Interscope Geffen A&M Records. Its division, DGC Records, would be absorbed into Geffen soon after, but Beck and Sonic Youth did not fulfill their contracts with the sublabel until 2003. After years of low sales and profits, Geffen laid off or vacated 110 workers, but later recovered under Interscope's supervision, which at the time, was under the leadership of Jimmy Iovine.

In 2003, Universal dissolved MCA Records and DreamWorks Records; MCA president Jay Boberg had resigned the prior spring while UMG (in October) acquired the latter label from Geffen's film label, DreamWorks Pictures, with rosters from both labels transitioning to Geffen Records. The acquisitions and later dissolutions of both imprints caused 120 staff layoffs, while some remained under Geffen; a few went to work for its parent, Interscope.

In February 2024, Universal Music Group reorganized Geffen Records and its parent label, Interscope Records, through a unit merger with sister label, Capitol Records (which they acquired from later-defunct EMI in 2012). As a result, Geffen, Interscope and Capitol operate autonomously under a new music unit, Interscope Capitol Labels Group.

Despite the fact that Geffen founded and owned Geffen Records, former president Eddie Rosenblatt, who died on July 17, 2024 (aged 89), was acknowledged to have been the one who led Geffen Records during its glory years in the 1980s and 1990s.

=== Geffen Film/DreamWorks SKG ===
Through the Geffen Film Company, Geffen produced dark-tinged comedies such as the remake of Little Shop of Horrors (1986), Risky Business (1983) and Beetlejuice (1988). Geffen was the Broadway backer for the musicals Dreamgirls and Cats. In 1994, Geffen co-founded the DreamWorks SKG studio with Steven Spielberg and Jeffrey Katzenberg. In 1995, DreamWorks signed a $100 million deal with ABC. In 2008, Geffen left DreamWorks.

== Philanthropy ==
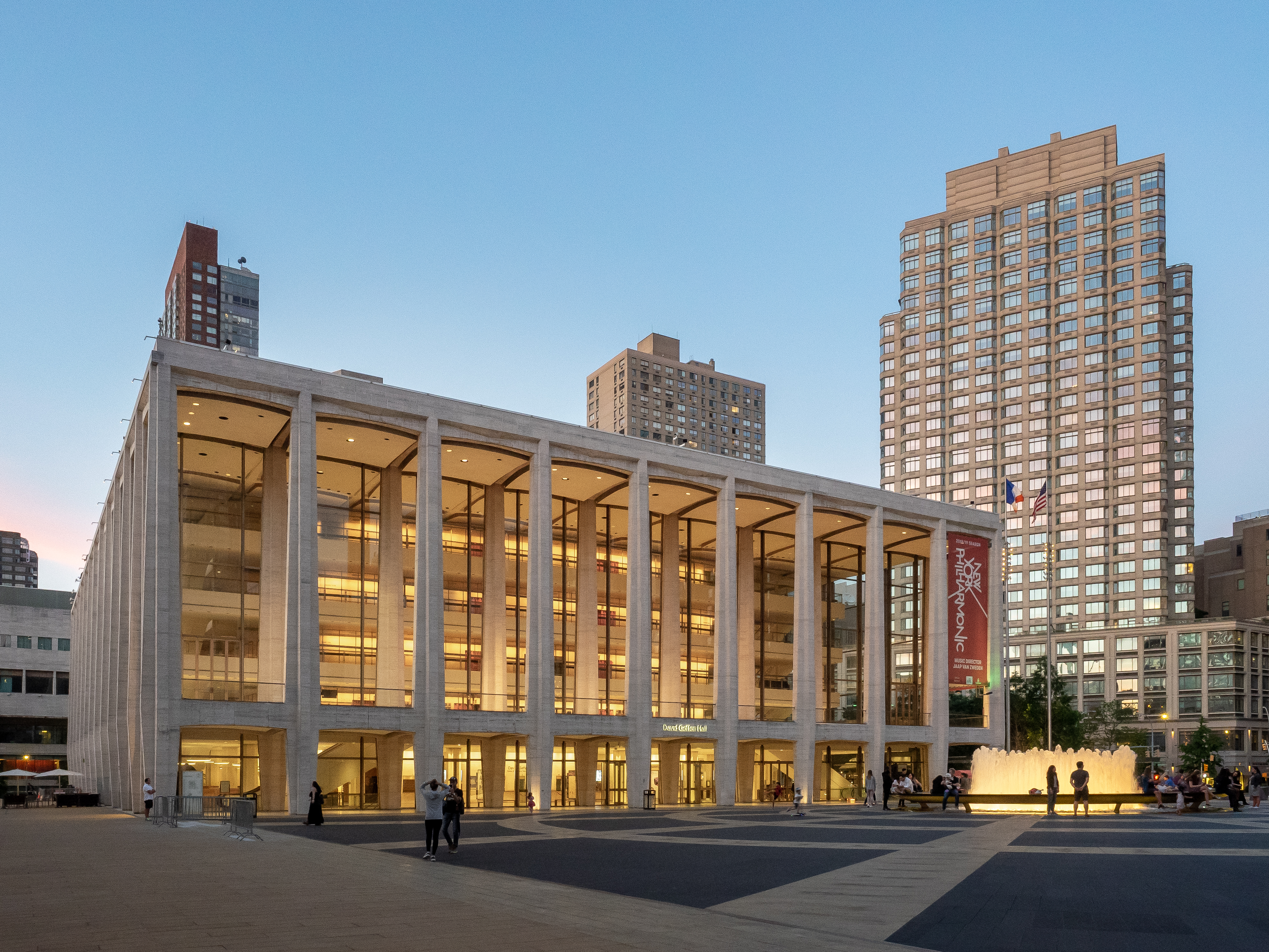
David Geffen Hall as seen from Lincoln Center Plaza

In 1995, he donated $5 million towards UCLA's Westwood Playhouse. The theater was renamed the Geffen Playhouse.

According to Forbes ("The 400 Richest Americans of 2004") and other sources, Geffen has pledged to give whatever money he makes from now on to charity, although he has not specified which charities or the manner of his giving. In 2002, he announced a $200 million unrestricted endowment for the School of Medicine at UCLA. The School thereafter was named David Geffen School of Medicine at UCLA. On December 13, 2012, UCLA announced that Geffen had donated another $100 million in addition to his 2002 donation of $200 million, making him the largest individual benefactor for the UC system. The latest donation funds the full cost of attendance for up to 30 students per year, beginning with the Class of 2017.

In 2015, Geffen pledged $100 million toward the renovation of what was then called the Avery Fisher Hall, part of Lincoln Center for the Performing Arts in New York. His gift, which amounted to about 20% of the hall's renovation costs, gave him naming rights in perpetuity over the building, now known as David Geffen Hall.

In December 2020, Geffen pledged to donate $46 million to the UCLA medical school, which is named after him.

In June 2021, Geffen gave $150 million to the Yale School of Drama. This gift allowed the drama school to eliminate tuition for all students enrolled in master's, doctoral, and certificate programs. The school was renamed the David Geffen School of Drama at Yale University.

In September 2021, Columbia Business School announced that David Geffen had made a gift of $75 million to support the school's new facilities in the Manhattanville neighborhood, north of Columbia's main campus. In recognition of his donation, the East Building was renamed David Geffen Hall when opened in 2022.

== Personal life ==
=== Sexuality and relationships ===
During the 1970s, Geffen dated Cher and spent eighteen months in a relationship with her. They began their relationship in 1973, while Cher was still married to Sonny Bono, but their marriage was already ending. Geffen helped Cher gain independence in her career, since she was dependent on Sonny for some business contracts that Geffen would later call "slave labor". In early 1974, Cher's divorce became public and was heavily covered by the media, and it was at this time that Cher and Geffen made their first appearance together, at the Grammy Awards ceremony. It was from this moment that Geffen became a media celebrity. Eventually, Cher left him for Gregg Allman.

Geffen eventually came out as gay in 1992. In May 2007, Out magazine ranked Geffen first in its list of the 50 "Most Powerful Gay Men and Women in America". Geffen married 30-year-old former go-go dancer and pornographic film actor Donovan Michaels (real name David Armstrong) in 2023. In May 2025, Geffen filed for divorce; he did not have a pre-nuptial agreement with Michaels. In November, 2026 (just seven months after their divorce was finalized), Out magazine reported that Geffen and Michaels were back together, having been photographed romantically on Geffen’s megayacht.

As of October 2023, Geffen has an estimated net worth of $9.1 billion, making him one of the richest people in the entertainment industry.

In February 2020, Geffen sold his Beverly Hills estate to Amazon CEO Jeff Bezos for $165 million, a price believed to be the highest ever paid for a home in a California real estate transaction. In June 2020, Geffen purchased Casey Wasserman's Beverly Hills estate for $68 million.

In 2007, Geffen bought a half-share in friend Larry Ellison's luxury yacht Rising Sun, then at 138 meters (453 ft) the sixth largest motor yacht in the world. After Ellison ordered a new and more compact 91 meters (299 ft) yacht, he sold his remaining half share in Rising Sun to Geffen in 2010.

In 2009, Russian billionaire Roman Abramovich agreed to a divorce settlement with his wife Irina that resulted in her taking ownership of the 115-meter (377 ft) yacht Pelorus. Approached on Geffen's behalf by broker Merle Wood, Irina sold Pelorus to Geffen in 2011 for $300 million. Later that year Geffen sold Pelorus to Sheikh Abdullah bin Zayed bin Sultan Al Nahyan for €214 million, significantly below its former price.

=== Art collection ===
Geffen is a keen collector of American artists' work, including Jackson Pollock, Mark Rothko and Willem de Kooning. According to the chief curator at the Museum of Contemporary Art in Los Angeles, Paul Schimmel: "There's no collection that has a better representation of post-war American art than David Geffen's."

In October 2006, Geffen sold two paintings by Jasper Johns and a De Kooning from his collection for a combined sum of $143.5 million. On November 3, 2006, The New York Times reported that Geffen had sold Pollock's 1948 painting No. 5, 1948 from his collection for $140 million (£73.35 million) to Mexican financier David Martinez. Martinez is the founder of London-based Fintech Advisory Ltd, a financial house that specializes in buying Third World debt. The sale made No. 5, 1948 the most expensive painting ever sold (outstripping the $134 million paid in October 2006 for Gustav Klimt's portrait Portrait of Adele Bloch-Bauer I, purchased by cosmetics heir Ronald Lauder).

Geffen was an investor in Digital Entertainment Network.

In February 2016, Bloomberg News reported that Geffen had sold De Kooning's 1955 oil painting, Interchange, for $300 million, and Pollock's 1948 painting, Number 17A, for $200 million, both to hedge fund billionaire Ken Griffin.

=== Political views ===
Geffen is a donor to Democratic Party candidates and organizations, and was an early financial supporter of President Bill Clinton. In 2001, he had a quarrel with the former president over Clinton's decision not to pardon Leonard Peltier, on whose behalf he had lobbied the President.

Geffen was an early supporter of Barack Obama’s presidential campaign and raised $1.3 million for Obama in a Beverly Hills fundraiser.

Along with other Hollywood figures, including Steven Spielberg and Brad Pitt, Geffen donated to oppose Proposition 8 in the November 2008 election. Proposition 8 would have amended California's Constitution to ban same-sex marriage. California's voters passed Proposition 8 by a margin of 52.24% to 47.76%. Decisions in federal courts ultimately invalidated California's prohibition of same-sex marriage. See 2008 California Proposition 8 § Legal challenges.

Geffen, among other wealthy Democrats, donated to the Lincoln Project, a Republican-led super PAC that opposed the re-election of Donald Trump and the Republican senators who supported Trump in the 2020 presidential election.

== Controversy ==
Until 2017, Geffen owned a Malibu compound on Carbon Beach. In 1983, Geffen received permits from the California Coastal Commission to build a Cape Cod-style compound over multiple beachfront lots in exchange for creating a public pathway to the beach. He failed to build that pathway, and in 2002, filed a lawsuit to block public access altogether. After a protracted three-year legal battle, Geffen reached a settlement with the Coastal Commission, granting the public a nine-foot-wide easement to the beach and reimbursing the state and non-profit groups $300,000 in legal fees.

The pathway was opened on May 30, 2005, to national and international media coverage. The controversy has been called the "most famous Malibu battle" for beach access. The Coastal Commission later contacted the state transportation department without receiving a response to ask if the curb cuts that prevented public parking were valid, amid rumors that Geffen had installed four fake garage doors. The house was later sold to Mark Walter, the principal owner of the Los Angeles Dodgers, for $85 million.

On March 9, 2022, The Wall Street Journal reported that Geffen, Barry Diller and Diller's stepson, Alex von Furstenberg, were being investigated by the Securities and Exchange Commission and the United States Department of Justice for insider trading of options on Activision Blizzard just three days before Microsoft's announced acquisition. Diller denied the allegations and said it was "simply a lucky bet".

During the COVID-19 pandemic, Geffen drew backlash for posting on Instagram that he and a 45-member crew were self-isolating in the Grenadines on the Rising Sun.

In 2021, Geffen was ranked the most polluting individual American and second most polluting individual in the world, largely due to his yachts.

== Awards and honors ==
In 2010, Geffen was a recipient of the Ahmet Ertegun Award from the Rock and Roll Hall of Fame.

In 2011, Geffen was awarded the President's Merit Award for "indelible contributions to the music industry" from the National Academy of Recording Arts and Sciences at the 53rd Grammy Awards.

== Cultural references ==
While Geffen has produced music, he has also been the subject of several songs, documentaries and books.

Joni Mitchell and Geffen were close friends and, in the early 1970s, made a trip to Paris with Robbie Robertson and Robertson's wife, Dominique. As a result of that trip, Mitchell wrote "Free Man in Paris" about Geffen. Geffen can be heard on Barbra Streisand's The Broadway Album, released in 1985. The track "Putting It Together" features Geffen, Sydney Pollack, and Ken Sylk portraying the voices of record company executives talking to Streisand.

Geffen is the subject of several books, most recently The Operator: David Geffen Builds, Buys, and Sells the New Hollywood (2001) by Tom King, who initially had Geffen's cooperation, but later did not. An earlier biography was The Rise and Rise of David Geffen (1997) by Stephen Singular. He is also a featured character in Mailroom: Hollywood History From The Bottom Up by David Rensen, in Mansion On The Hill by Fred Goodman, in Hotel California by Barney Hoskyns, and in several books about Michael Ovitz.

He was the subject of an American Masters PBS television documentary titled Inventing David Geffen. The documentary was directed by Susan Lacy and was first broadcast on 20 November 2012. In the first season of The West Wing, Bob Balaban plays a character reported to be a thinly veiled version of Geffen, as he pressured a sitting president to come out more strongly for gay rights in America.
