= Ken Griffin =

American billionaire hedge fund manager (born 1968)

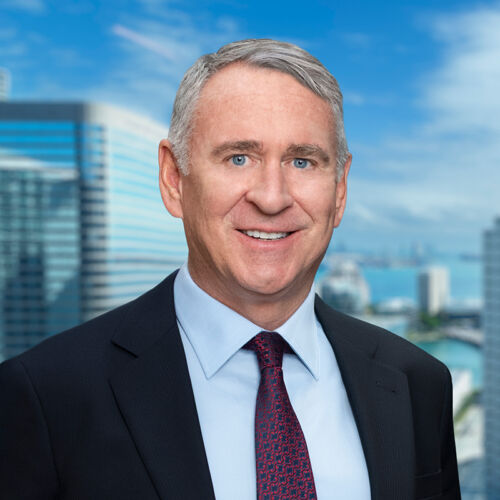
- Griffin in 2026
- Born: Kenneth Cordele Griffin; 1968 (age 57–58); Daytona Beach, Florida, U.S.
- Education: Harvard University (BA)
- Occupations: Hedge fund manager Entrepreneur; Investor
- Years active: 1990–present
- Known for: Founder of Citadel LLC and Citadel Securities LLC
- Title: CEO and co-CIO, Citadel LLC
- Political party: Republican
- Spouses: Katherine Weingartt (m. 1991; div. 1996) Anne Dias (m. 2003; div. 2015)
- Children: 3

Kenneth Cordele Griffin (born 1968) is an American hedge fund manager, entrepreneur and investor. He is the founder, chief executive officer, co-chief investment officer, and 80% owner of Citadel LLC, a multinational hedge fund. He also owns Citadel Securities, one of the largest market makers in the United States.

As of January 2026, Griffin had an estimated net worth of $51.2 billion, making him the world's 34th-richest person. In 2015, he made the largest private art deal in history when he bought two paintings, Willem de Kooning's Interchange and Jackson Pollock's Number 17A, for $500 million.

Griffin was included in Forbes's 2023 list of the U.S.'s Most Generous Givers, according to which he had donated $1.56 billion to various charitable causes, primarily in education, economic mobility, and medical research. He has also contributed hundreds of millions of dollars to political candidates and causes, usually Republican or conservative in ideology. Griffin is a member of The Business Council.

== Early life and education ==
Griffin was born in 1968 in Daytona Beach, Florida, the son of a building supplies executive. His father had various jobs, and was a project manager for General Electric. Griffin's grandmother, Genevieve Huebsch Gratz, inherited an oil business, three farms, and a seed business after her husband and multiple relatives died.

Griffin grew up in Boca Raton, Florida, as well as Texas and Wisconsin. He went to middle school in Boca Raton and Boca Raton Community High School, where he was the president of the math club. In high school, Griffin ran a discount mail-order education software firm, EDCOM, out of his bedroom. In a 1986 Sun-Sentinel article, he said he thought he would become a businessman or lawyer and that he believed the job market for computer programmers would significantly decline over the coming decade.

Griffin started at Harvard College in 1986. That year, one of his first investments was to buy put options on Home Shopping Network. He made $5,000. He also invested in convertible arbitrage opportunities in convertible bonds. Despite a ban on running businesses from campus, Griffin convinced school administrators to allow him to install a satellite dish on the roof of his dormitory, Cabot House, to receive stock quotes. He also asked Terrence J. O'Connor, the manager of convertible bonds at Merrill Lynch in Boston, to open a brokerage account for him with $100,000 that Griffin had gotten from his grandmother, his dentist, and others. His first fund launched in 1987, with $265,000. It launched in time to profit from short positions on Black Monday. Griffin graduated from Harvard in 1989 with a Bachelor of Arts degree in economics.

== Career ==
After graduating in 1989, Griffin moved to Chicago to work with Frank Meyer, founder of Glenwood Capital Investments. Meyer allotted $1 million of Glenwood capital for Griffin to trade and Griffin made 70% in a year.

In 1990, Griffin founded Citadel LLC, with assets under management (AUM) of $4.6 million, aided by contributions from Meyer. His funds made 43% in 1991 and 40% in 1992.

In the early 2000s, Griffin founded market maker Citadel Securities. In January 2022, Citadel Securities raised $1.15 billion from Sequoia Capital and Paradigm at a valuation of $22 billion, in its first outside investment since its founding. As of January 2026, Citadel has approximately $67 billion in AUM, after distributing $5 billion in 2025 profits to investors. Since its founding in 1990, Citadel has generated approximately $90.4 billion in net gains after fees, making it the most profitable hedge fund in history, according to LCH Investments.

In 2003, aged 34, Griffin was the youngest person on the Forbes 400, with an estimated net worth of $650 million.

From the time of his second marriage to Anne Dias in 2003 until late 2009, Griffin was the lead investor in Aragon Global Management, a hedge fund run by his then wife. The fund was also seeded with money from Julian Robertson. Griffin lost 20% of his investment in the fund.

In 2006, Citadel acquired the positions of Amaranth Advisors at a steep discount.

During the 2008 financial crisis, for 10 months, Griffin barred his investors from withdrawing money, attracting criticism. At the crisis's peak, the firm was losing "hundreds of millions of dollars each week". It was leveraged 7:1 and the biggest funds at Citadel finished 2008 down 55%, but rebounded with a 62% return in 2009. In 2022, as global markets suffered their worst losses since 2008, Citadel's flagship Wellington fund delivered a 38.1% return, generating a record $16 billion in profits for investors, the largest annual gain in hedge fund history, surpassing John Paulson's $15 billion gain during the 2007 subprime crisis. At year end, Citadel returned $7 billion in profits to investors to keep its asset base lean.

From Citadel LLC, Griffin earned $900 million in 2009, $1.4 billion in 2014, $600 million in 2016, $1.4 billion in 2017, $870 million in 2018, $1.5 billion in 2019, and $1.8 billion in 2020.

In November 2020, according to Bloomberg News, Griffin's net worth surpassed $20 billion due to an increase in the value of Citadel, of which Griffin's stake was worth $11.2 billion. Citadel Securities, a market maker, increased its profit to $2.36 billion during the first half of 2020 compared to $982 million for the same period in 2019, due to increased volatility, volume and retail trader engagement.

In January 2021, Griffin attracted criticism for the role Citadel played in the GameStop short squeeze. On January 25, it was announced that Citadel would invest $2 billion into Melvin Capital, which had suffered losses of more than 30% on account of its short positions, particularly on GameStop. On January 28, Robinhood, an electronic trading platform favored by many traders involved in buying GameStop stock and options, announced that it would halt all purchases of GameStop securities and only allow these securities to be sold; the price of GME stock declined steeply shortly thereafter. Because Robinhood received a substantial portion of its revenue through a payment for order flow relationship with Citadel, 85% of which Griffin owned, many commentators criticized the potential for conflict of interest when the same entity both plays the role of market-maker and also participates in the market it makes; Griffin has been at the center of much discussion of this controversy. On February 18, 2021, he testified before the House Financial Services Committee about his role in the GameStop controversy; Griffin had donated money directly to four members of the committee, Republicans French Hill, Andy Barr, Ann Wagner, and Bill Huizenga. Thereafter, the SEC concluded that conspiracy theories about the event were unfounded.

In June 2022, Griffin announced that Citadel and Citadel Securities would move their global headquarters from Chicago to Miami. He said that Miami offered a growing business environment and cited concerns regarding crime and public policy in Chicago. Citadel indicated that it would continue to maintain offices in Chicago while establishing Miami as its headquarters.

In January 2026, Griffin partnered with Goldman Properties to spend at least $180 million for an office building in the Wynwood creative district, expanding Citadel's footprint in Miami.

== Philanthropy ==
Griffin is a large private donor to charities and nonprofit organizations, having donated over $2 billion to charities so far.

=== Griffin Catalyst ===
In September 2023, Griffin launched Griffin Catalyst, a platform intended to organize and highlight his philanthropic and civic engagement initiatives. According to him, the effort was designed to provide an umbrella framework for future charitable giving and focuses on six areas: education, science and medicine, upward mobility, freedom and democracy, enterprise and innovation, and communities.

Reuters described Griffin Catalyst as a platform showcasing philanthropic organizations and initiatives supported by his giving.

=== Arts ===
From 2000 to 2022, Griffin served on the Museum of Contemporary Art Chicago's board of trustees.

In July 2007, Griffin donated a $19 million addition to the Art Institute of Chicago designed by Renzo Piano and named Kenneth and Anne Griffin Court. One of his paintings by Paul Cézanne was loaned to the institute.

In 2010, Griffin contributed to the Chicago Symphony Orchestra's productions at Millennium Park.

Griffin contributed to the Art Institute of Chicago and resigned from its board in 2022. He serves on the board of trustees at the Whitney Museum of American Art in New York, whose lobby bears his name: Kenneth C. Griffin Hall. In February 2015, Griffin donated $10 million to the Museum of Contemporary Art Chicago to create the Griffin Galleries of Contemporary Art.

In December 2015, Griffin donated an unrestricted $40 million to the Museum of Modern Art in New York. In 2018, he donated $20 million to the Norton Museum of Art.

=== Communities ===
In December 2021, Griffin gave $5 million to support the construction of Miami's 10-mile linear park and urban trail The Underline. In 2022, he created the Ukraine Math and Science Achievement Fund with $3 million, which supports young Ukrainian refugees studying at Cambridge University. In May 2022, he gave $5 million to help launch the Miami Disaster Resilience Fund, which prepares the city for disasters like hurricanes. In April 2024, the Preservation Foundation of Palm Beach announced a $7 million gift from Griffin. The money is to be used to support the restoration of Phipps Ocean Park, expand community education, and increase accessibility.

=== COVID-19 donations ===
In March 2020, in response to the COVID-19 pandemic, Griffin contributed $2.5 million to support food services for children in Chicago Public Schools. In May 2020, Griffin and his partners at Citadel made a £3 million donation to help develop a COVID-19 vaccine and to support NHS Nightingale Hospitals. Griffin oversaw a $2 million donation from Citadel to Weill Cornell Medicine to help fund the development of new ways to protect people from COVID-19 and identify new cases of the illness.

=== Education ===
Griffin has worked with the Bill and Melinda Gates Foundation to promote charter schools in the U.S. and fund tutoring.

In 2011, he worked with University of Chicago economics professor John A. List to test whether investment in teachers or in parents produces better student performance outcomes.

At the beginning of 2014, Griffin made a $150 million donation to the financial aid program at Harvard University, his alma mater, the largest single donation ever made to the institution at the time. In 2014, he was elected to a five-year term on the University of Chicago's board of trustees. He is also a member of the Economic Club of Chicago and the civic committee of the Commercial Club of Chicago. Griffin is the vice chairman of the Chicago Public Education Fund.

In October 2017, Griffin's charitable fund donated $1 million to the Obama Foundation. In November 2017, Griffin's charitable fund made a $125 million gift to support the Department of Economics of the University of Chicago, renamed the Kenneth C. Griffin Department of Economics.

Griffin donated $21.5 million to the Field Museum of Natural History and its dinosaur exhibit is named the Griffin Dinosaur Experience.

In October 2019, Griffin's charitable fund announced a $125 million gift to the Museum of Science and Industry in Chicago, the largest gift in the museum's history. The museum was renamed the Kenneth C. Griffin Museum of Science and Industry.

In April 2021, he donated $5 million to an initiative to provide Internet access to students in Miami. In November 2021, Griffin outbid a group of crypto investors to purchase the last privately held copy of the United States Constitution at auction for $43.2 million. Griffin said, "I intend to ensure that this copy of our Constitution will be available for all Americans and visitors to view and appreciate in our museums and other public spaces", with plans to display it first at the Crystal Bridges Museum of American Art in Arkansas.

In March 2022, Griffin donated $40 million to the American Museum of Natural History in New York to help complete the 230,000 square foot renovation. In July 2022, he donated $130 million to Chicago nonprofits before his move to Florida. In October 2022, Griffin donated $250,000 to a Miami scholarship program for STEM students, his first donation since moving Citadel's headquarters there.

Griffin, the Carnegie Corporation of New York, and the Walton Family Foundation have funded The Education Recovery Scorecard, an analysis of pandemic learning loss released in October 2022 that uses local and national test score data to map changes in student performance.

In April 2023, Griffin donated $300 million to the Harvard Faculty of Arts and Sciences, and Harvard announced that it would rename its Graduate School of Arts and Sciences after him. A few weeks later, Griffin donated $25 million to Success Academy Charter Schools, New York City's largest charter school network, and gave $20 million to Miami Dade College, where he also addressed the 2023 graduating class.

In April 2024, Griffin donated $9 million to fund a math-tutoring program for students in the Miami-Dade County Public Schools, in partnership with the University of Chicago and Accelerate, to address education gaps caused by the COVID-19 pandemic.

In September 2025, Griffin make a second donation to the Success Academy Charter Schools, donating $50 million to expand in South Florida. In November 2025, the University of Florida announced a $5.5 million gift from Griffin to its Hamilton School for Classical and Civic Education. The gift supports expansion of small, discussion-based courses modeled on the University of Oxford and University of Cambridge. It establishes the Griffin Fellows, graduate fellowships for doctoral candidates in the Western tradition, and the Griffin Scholars, merit-based undergraduate scholarships, supporting study abroad, research, and internships in law and public policy.

In August 2026, Griffin announced a $5 million gift to launch the National Math Talent Fund, "an effort to help financially stressed math students across the country get their degrees". "The fund establishes a partnership between the Mathematical Association of America and the Last Mile Education Fund."

In September 2026, Griffin pledged $3 billion to Carnegie Mellon University, the largest single donation to an American university. The pledge provides $2 billion for a new campus in Miami's Wynwood neighborhood and $1 billion for the Pittsburgh campus, divided equally between a fund for the university's top priorities and the School of Computer Science. The school will be renamed the Kenneth C. Griffin School of Computer Science.

=== Military and veterans ===
In July 2020, Griffin donated $10 million to the U.S. Navy SEAL Foundation. The gift will support the expansion of resiliency programming for children, fund a scholarship program for higher education, and support other programs for Navy SEALs and their families. In November 2023, he donated $30 million to the National Medal of Honor Museum Foundation to support the construction of a museum in Arlington, Texas, honoring the recipients of the medal. The museum will include a theater and a conference center to provide national educational programming.

=== Poverty ===
Griffin supported the University of Chicago's Center for Urban School Improvement, a program encouraging the construction of an inner-city charter high school, and contributed to the Lurie Children's Hospital.

In 2017, Griffin contributed $15 million to the Robin Hood Foundation.

In May 2022, The University of Chicago announced a $25 million donation from Griffin to launch an initiative design to train police managers and prevent neighborhood violence. The funds will aid in launching two community Safety Leadership Academies. The Policing Management Academy aims to professionalize departments by educating their leaders though coaching, accountability and data-driven decision making. This donation came after Griffin's $10 million donation to the Crime Lab in 2018 to implement an early intervention system to investigate citizen complaints.

=== Religion ===
Griffin is a member of the Fourth Presbyterian Church of Chicago, where he was married. In 2011, he donated $11.5 million of the $38.2 million needed to build a new chapel at the church. The modern building is called "The Gratz Center" in honor of Griffin's grandparents. His children were baptized in the Fourth Presbyterian Church.

=== Science and medicine ===
In March 2023, Griffin partnered with former Google CEO Eric Schmidt to donate $50 million to Schmidt's new scientific research project, Convergent Research. In early 2023, Griffin gave $25 million, his largest single donation to date in Florida, to the Nicklaus Children's Hospital in Miami. In December 2023, Griffin and American entrepreneur David Geffen pledged to donate $400 million to the Memorial Sloan Kettering Cancer Center, the largest single gift in the cancer center's 150-year history.

In March 2024, Griffin announced a gift of $50 million to be used for research at the Sylvester Comprehensive Cancer Center at the University of Miami. A new 12-story facility is under construction and will be named the Kenneth C. Griffin Cancer Research Building. Also announced in March 2024 was an additional $50 million donation from Griffin's philanthropic organization Griffin Catalyst to the Baptist Health Foundation to expand its Miami Neuroscience Institute. The facility is to be named the Kenneth C. Griffin Center at the Baptist Health Miami Neuroscience Institute.

== Political views and activities ==
In a 2012 interview with the Chicago Tribune, Griffin said that the rich actually have too little influence in politics. He identified as a Ronald Reagan Republican. He said the belief "that a larger government is what creates prosperity, that a larger government is what creates good" is wrong.

In a November 2015 interview on CNBC, Griffin said he admires Scott Walker, calling him an "absolute champion of free markets and a champion of smaller government".

In April 2016, because Citadel owned over 1 million shares of McDonald's, Griffin was the target of protestors supporting the Fight for $15. In May 2017, he praised Donald Trump's efforts at tax and healthcare reform.

In 2018, it was announced that Griffin had been appointed the national finance chair for the New Republican PAC fueling Rick Scott's Super PAC.

In November 2018, Griffin criticized Trump's tweets berating Chair of the Federal Reserve Jerome Powell, calling them "completely inappropriate for the president of the United States".

In January 2019, Griffin was singled out by Elizabeth Warren on a Facebook post as someone who can pay her Ultra-Millionaire Tax. During a March 2019 interview with David Rubenstein, he criticized Warren's proposals, saying, "soaking the rich doesn't work".

In January 2020, Griffin was absent from a signing ceremony for the phase-one trade deal with China at the White House, for which Trump criticized him.

In September 2020, Griffin wrote an op-ed published in the Chicago Tribune stating his opposition to Governor of Illinois J. B. Pritzker's "Fair Tax" proposal, which would change Illinois's income tax from a flat tax to a graduated tax. In an October 2020 email to Citadel LLC's Chicago employees, Griffin criticized Pritzker's tax plan and alluded to the possibility of moving his company out of Illinois.

While being interviewed by Paul Tudor Jones at the Robin Hood Foundation investor conference in October 2020, Griffin criticized Joe Biden's plans to raise the long-term capital gains tax rate.

After Hamas's October 7 attacks on Israel in 2023, Griffin contacted the Harvard Corporation leadership to demand a university response, including a condemnation of 30 student groups that signed a letter critical of Israel. He also supported statements made by fellow alumnus and donor Bill Ackman that his firm would not hire students who signed the letter. In January 2024, Griffin expressed his discontent with Harvard's educational approach, saying that the university should focus on educating future leaders and problem solvers rather than getting lost in issues like microaggressions and DEI. In May 2024, he criticized the "failed education system" for anti-Israel protests on campuses, urging Harvard to "embrace our Western values that have built one of the greatest nations in the world".

Griffin has criticized President Trump's tariffs, saying that the U.S. "is on a slippery slope to crony capitalism".

In January 2026, Griffin suggested the development of artificial intelligence is overhyped, saying, "You're not going to generate this kind of spend unless you're going to make a promise you're going to profoundly change the world."

In April 2026, New York City Mayor Zohran Mamdani featured Griffin's residence in a video announcing a new wealth tax. In response, Griffin threatened to stop the development of a Citadel office building at 350 Park Avenue in New York City to focus on Miami instead. In August 2026, Griffin announced that he intended for Citadel to continue its investment at 350 Park Avenue as the anchor tenant.

=== Political contributions ===
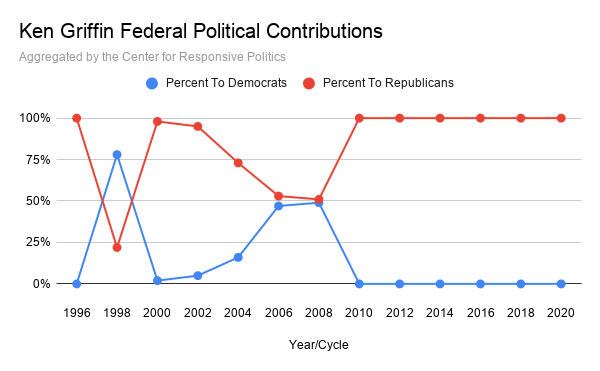
Ken Griffin's federal political contributions since 1996

In a 2012 interview, Griffin said that people should be able to make unlimited contributions to politicians, but that the contributions should be public.

Griffin has made political donations to conservative political candidates, parties, and organizations, such as American Crossroads and the Republican Governors Association.

During the 2010 United States elections, Griffin donated $721,600 to federal candidates and political committees. Except for a $2,400 contribution to then United States Senate Committee on Banking, Housing, and Urban Affairs Chairman Chris Dodd, all the contributions were to Republicans. During the 2012 election cycle, Griffin contributed around $1.1 million to Restore Our Future, a pro-Romney super PAC.

Griffin contributed $2 million to the Freedom Partners Action Fund, a Republican-aligned super PAC backed by Charles and David Koch, in November 2015. The next month, Griffin endorsed Marco Rubio for the 2016 Republican presidential nomination. He gave $5 million to a pro-Rubio super PAC. Before this endorsement, he had donated $100,000 each to three super PACs supporting Rubio, Jeb Bush, and Scott Walker for the nomination.

Griffin was the biggest donor to Rahm Emanuel's campaign for reelection as mayor of Chicago.

Griffin was one of the primary backers of Future 45, a pro-Trump super PAC. After Trump won the 2016 Republican nomination, Griffin did not contribute to his campaign.

In 2017, he contributed $20 million to the campaign of Governor of Illinois Bruce Rauner.

In March 2020, Griffin contributed $1 million to the 1820 PAC created to support the reelection of U.S. Senator Susan Collins. In late 2020, he donated another $500,000 to the 1820 PAC.

In 2020, Griffin donated $20 million to the Coalition To Stop The Proposed Tax Hike Amendment, a group opposing the Illinois Fair Tax in its 2020 referendum. Weeks later, he donated another $26.75 million to the coalition. Griffin later donated another $7 million to the group, bringing his total contributions to $53.75 million. Also that year, he donated $2 million to an anti-retention effort for Justice Thomas L. Kilbride, a Democrat on the Supreme Court of Illinois.

Griffin supported Kelly Loeffler and David Perdue in the 2020–21 United States Senate election in Georgia. In October 2020, he was criticized for a $2 million contribution to a Super PAC supporting Loeffler and funded by her husband, New York Stock Exchange Chairman Jeffrey Sprecher just after one of Citadel LLC's companies needed Sprecher's approval for a merger.

Griffin contributed a total of $66 million to the 2020 United States elections.

In 2021, Griffin donated $5 million to Ron DeSantis, the governor of Florida. His donations to DeSantis prompted criticism of a possible conflict of interest when DeSantis began promoting Regeneron Pharmaceuticals' therapeutic treatment for COVID-19. DeSantis has encouraged such monoclonal antibody treatment for COVID-19, which can treat people after they get sick and reduce hospitalization. Shares in Regeneron were a $16 million investment by Griffin's hedge fund. The fund denied any conflict of interest, noting that it had much larger investments in vaccine makers Pfizer and Moderna. Likewise, a DeSantis spokesperson said that any suggestion of corruption over this connection to Griffin via Regeneron was illogical. Griffin has at times criticized DeSantis, for example saying, "I don't appreciate Governor DeSantis going after Disney's tax status".

Later in 2021, Griffin promised to donate twice the amount to the Republican opponent of incumbent governor J. B. Pritzker that Pritzker gave himself for the 2022 Illinois gubernatorial election.

For the 2022 elections, Griffin gave $10 million to Congressional Leadership Fund, the super PAC assisting House Republicans, and $5 million to the super PAC supporting Senate Republicans. On May 5, 2022, he donated $1.5 million to Lisa Murkowski through Alaskans for L.I.S.A. (Leadership in a Strong Alaska).

In March 2023, Griffin contributed $1 million to a political committee affiliated with Miami Mayor Francis Suarez.

Griffin backed Nikki Haley for the 2024 Republican primaries and contributed $5 million to her presidential campaign. He also supported David McCormick's and Tim Sheehy's Senate campaigns, contributing $10 million and $5 million, respectively. In August 2024, Griffin contributed $12 million to an effort to defeat a proposed amendment that would legalize recreational cannabis in Florida.

As of August 2026, Griffin had spent $32.4 million in support of Republican candidates in the 2026 United States elections.

== Personal life ==
=== Marriages ===
Griffin's first wife was Katherine Weingartt, his high-school sweetheart. The couple married in 1991 and divorced in 1996.

In March 2002, Griffin met his second wife, Anne Dias-Griffin, after being set up on a blind date by a mutual friend. The couple married in July 2003 and had three children.

In July 2014, Griffin filed a divorce petition in Cook County, Illinois, citing "irreconcilable differences" with Dias-Griffin. The couple had a prenuptial agreement that governed the split of their assets in the event of divorce. The couple settled their divorce out of court in October 2015, just hours before a public trial over the prenuptial agreement was set to begin. As part of the divorce, Griffin paid $11.75 million to buy out his wife's interest in their Chicago penthouse. He and Dias-Griffin maintain joint custody of their children.

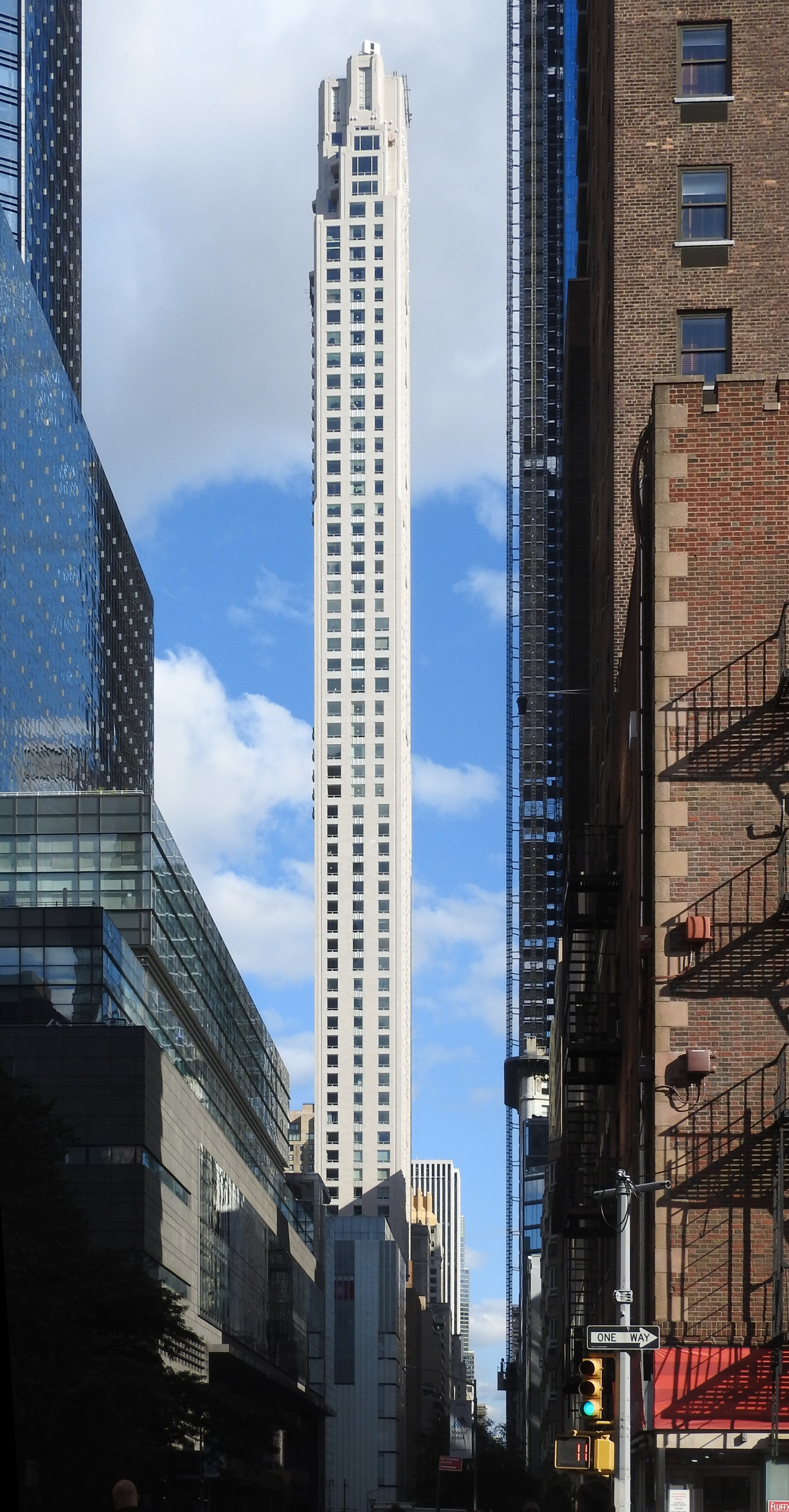
In January 2019, Griffin purchased 4 unfurnished floors at 220 Central Park South (pictured) for $238 million, breaking the record for the most expensive home ever sold in the United States.

=== Personal residences ===
Griffin owns personal residences valued at more than $1 billion. Since 2009, he has purchased multiple residences, mostly in the U.S., but also in England. Some of Griffin's real estate purchases were in Miami, Florida; Palm Beach, Florida; New York City; Southampton, New York; and London, England. Several broke records, such as the 2019 purchase of 24,000 square-feet on three floors at 220 Central Park South for $238 million, the most expensive residential sale ever closed in U.S. history, and his 2023 purchase of the Coconut Grove Arsht estate in Miami, which set a Miami-Dade County record at the time.

In October 2025, Griffin proposed a private megayacht marina on Miami Beach's Terminal Island. Designed at 30,000 square feet, the marina would be part of a 3.7-acre property with berth spaces for six superyachts, along with pools, pickleball courts, and facilities for crew. It was approved in November 2025.

=== Art collection ===
Griffin is an active buyer of modern art and contemporary art from mainstream artists. His portfolio is valued at close to $800 million and includes several paintings on the list of most expensive paintings.

In 1999, he purchased Paul Cézanne's 1893 painting Curtain, Jug and Fruit Bowl for a reported record $60 million for a Cézanne at the time.

In October 2006, he purchased False Start by artist Jasper Johns for $80 million from David Geffen. In 2015, he purchased Gerhard Richter's 1986 painting Abstract Picture, 599 for $46 million.

Interchange (1955), painted by Willem de Kooning

In September 2015, in the largest private art deal ever, he purchased two paintings from Geffen for $500 million: Willem de Kooning's 1955 oil painting Interchange for $300 million, and Jackson Pollock's 1948 painting Number 17A for $200 million.

In June 2020, he purchased Boy and Dog in a Johnnypump (1982) by Jean-Michel Basquiat for over $100 million. He loaned the painting to the Art Institute of Chicago to be put on public display. Griffin's collection also includes art by Njideka Akunyili Crosby.

=== Dinosaur ===
In 2024, Griffin bought the Stegosaurus skeleton Apex for $44.6 million. It was the highest-priced fossil ever sold at auction.

=== Private jets ===
Griffin owns two private jets: a 2001 Bombardier Global Express valued at $9.5 million and a $50 million 2012 Bombardier Global 6000.

=== Withdrawn fraud accusation ===
In 2006, Rush E. Simonson, claiming to be Griffin's mentor, filed a fraud case against Griffin, alleging that he was entitled to a percentage of Citadel's profits for creating a computer program upon which Citadel was founded. In court filings, Simonson said that he first befriended Griffin in 1982 as a computer salesman. The two struck up a business partnership in convertible-arbitrage. Griffin provided the trading savvy, working both out of his Harvard dorm room and at home in Florida, while Simonson allegedly created the computer program that served as its technological backbone. As Griffin and Simonson began to unwind their partnership, the suit claimed, Griffin instead began to lay the foundations of what would become Citadel. In doing so, Griffin allegedly improperly took the program that Simonson had created. In 2007, Simonson dropped the lawsuit and apologized to Griffin.

== In popular culture ==
Nick Offerman portrays Griffin in the 2023 film Dumb Money, a biographical drama about the GameStop short squeeze. Griffin said the original script contained many fabrications, and he coordinated with Sony Pictures to correct some inaccuracies before its release, but he still finds aspects of the film to be sensationalized.

== See also ==
- List of Harvard University people
