= Last Mile Education Fund =

- LAST MILE EDUCATION FUND logo, submitted to Wikimedia Commons by RutheF08, November 12, 2026

The Last Mile Education Fund is a non-profit organization that helps lower-income students in high-demand technical fields complete their college degrees and enter technical careers. The fund has provided over 18 million dollars to more than 15 thousand students at over 1,000 institutions across all 50 states and US territories. Applications are accepted at any time.

== History ==
The organization was founded in 2019 by Computer Science Professor Sarah Lee, Ph.D., STEM policymaker and activist Ruthe Farmer, M.B.A., and Information Security Analyst Rian Walker, B.S.E.

As of a 2021 article, Last Mile Education Fund was fiscally sponsored by the Baltimore-based Digital Harbor Foundation (DHF). In June 2022, Last Mile Education Fund (EIN: 88-0762233) was issued 501(c)(3) tax exempt status.

In 2021, the fund launched the Microsoft Cybersecurity Scholarship with the goal to support 10,000 low-income students, including veterans, enrolled in cybersecurity programs at 2-year institutions; the scholarship was enabled by a $6 million grant from Microsoft.

In 2022, the fund received support from SAP.

Also in 2022, the fund received support from Lyda Hill Philanthropies to offer the North Texas Biotech Workforce Fund to "increase access to biotech careers for low-income North Texas students."

Since 2023, with support from Applied Materials, the fund has offered the Momentum Fund to provide emergency financial support for women majoring in engineering.

In 2023, Rocket Community Fund and the Detroit Regional Chamber partnered with Last Mile Education Fund to offer the Detroit Area Talent Fund, to "address basic needs gaps for low-income individuals pursuing higher education in Detroit." "Launched in February 2023 as a pilot program, the first phase of the Detroit Area Talent Fund supported nearly 1,300 Detroit students." The fund was continued and expanded in March 2024 with the additional support of the Ford Fund, Kresge Foundation, Michigan Central, and the Skillman Foundation.

In 2023, with support from DOW, the fund launched the Dow Last Mile Education Fund for Manufacturing & Skilled Trades to support students in trade school or within 50 miles of DOW facility who are facing financial obstacles--specifically in "California, Illinois, Indiana, Kentucky, Louisiana, Michigan, Pennsylvania, Tennessee, Texas, and West Virginia."

In July 2026, Ford Philanthropy, Uber, and Rocket Community Fund teamed up with Last Mile Education Fund to offer the Transportation Access Fund, addressing transportation barriers affecting student access to their campuses, internship sites, or other education opportunities.

An August, 2026 Miami Herald article announced that hedge fund manager Ken Griffin made a $5 million gift to launch the National Math Talent Fund, establishing a partnership between the Mathematical Association of America and Last Mile Education Fund "to help financially stressed math students across the country get their degrees."

In November 2025 Applied Materials, Cadence Design Systems, Lam Research, the KLA Foundation partnered with Last Mile Education Fund to offer the Semiconductor Pathway Fund, to protect existing and future talent, "ensuring that the engineers and technicians already enrolled in STEM programs make it across the finish line to graduation; Intel and AMD also joined subsequently." "Operating as an industry alliance of six major semiconductor and design automation leaders, the initiative is working toward a $20 million funding target to graduate 6,700 engineering and technical students by 2028."

== Work ==
The fund focuses on helping students in their final four semesters to go the 'last mile,' reaching graduation and the workforce. The average investment is around $1200 per student. The organization helps students with small, $595 rapid delivery grants as well as grants up to $10,000 for whatever they need to finish their degree and enter the workforce, including tuition, fees, groceries, rent, vehicle repairs, essential travel, a laptop, or funeral expenses. The application has a rolling deadline and students typically receive more funding than they request. The work is informed in part by college completion data for under-funded students in STEM fields: "Only 20% of students from the bottom two income quartiles finish in six or even eight years of starting college." Students supported by the fund have a 74% graduation rate, higher than national averages, including STEM majors. The organization's five year (2020–2024) and 2025 impact report indicated that each dollar invested in students yielded a 246 dollar return in social and economic impact, increasing income and social contribution and decreasing draw on public resources. 2026 figures indicate an 80% graduation rate for awardees and a 45x 10 year societal return on investment. "Once those students become working professionals, they help generate funding and awareness to help the next group of students coming up behind them."

== Leadership ==
Co-founder Ruthe Farmer serves as the CEO. Caroline Esmurdoc is the COO.

== Location ==
The organization is headquartered in Lafayette, Colorado.
