= Number 17A =

1948 painting by Jackson Pollock

- Artist: Jackson Pollock
- Year: 1948
- Type: Oil paint on fiberboard
- Dimensions: 112 cm × 86.5 cm (44 in × 34.1 in)
- Location: Private collection of Kenneth C. Griffin

Number 17A is an abstract expressionist painting by American painter Jackson Pollock, from 1948.

The painting is oil paint on fiberboard and is a drip painting, created by splashing paint onto a horizontal surface. It was painted a year after Jackson Pollock introduced his drip technique. The piece was featured in the August 1949 edition of Life that made Jackson Pollock a celebrity.

It is owned by hedge fund manager Kenneth C. Griffin, who purchased it in September 2015 from David Geffen for $200 million, a then record-breaking price, at which time it was lent to the Art Institute of Chicago. As of May 2024, it is ranked 5th on the list of most expensive paintings.
