= No. 5, 1948 =

1948 painting by Jackson Pollock

- Artist: Jackson Pollock
- Year: 1948
- Type: Oil on fiberboard
- Dimensions: 2.4 m × 1.2 m (8 ft × 4 ft)
- Location: Private collection, New York

No. 5, 1948 is a 1948 painting by Jackson Pollock, an American painter known for his contributions to the abstract expressionist movement. It was sold on 22 May 2006 for $140 million, a new mark for highest ever price for a painting, not surpassed until April 2011.

== Composition ==
The painting was created on fibreboard, also known as composition board, measuring 8’ x 4’. For the paint, Pollock chose to use liquid paints. More specifically, they were synthetic resin paints (gloss enamel) but are referred to as oil paints for classification of the work. On inspection it was grey, brown, white and yellow paint drizzled in a way that many people still perceive as a "dense bird’s nest". Initial reactions to the work were underwhelming:

"You spent money on 'that'?" The initial reaction of Ted Dragon, Ossorio's partner.

== Damage and rework ==
During January 1949, the painting was being shown in a solo Pollock show at the Betty Parsons gallery. It was from here that Alfonso A. Ossorio decided to purchase a "paint drip" composition; he chose No. 5, 1948 and paid $1,500. It was the only canvas sold from the show. At some point, presumably during the moving process, the painting became damaged, according to Grace Hartigan. "Home Sweet Home [the shipping company] came in with a painting in one hand and a lump of paint from the center of the painting in the other hand." Hartigan gave Pollock some paint and he patched the painting before it went to Ossorio, saying "He’ll never know, never know." When the painting was subsequently delivered to Ossorio, he claimed that he noticed "a portion of the paint - actually the skin from the top of an opened paint can - had slid" leaving a "nondescript smear amidst the surrounding linear clarity," as he explained in a 1978 lecture at Yale. Pollock offered to rework the painting but, according to Hartigan, he "repainted the whole thing again" and stated that "He'll never know. No one knows how to look at my paintings, he won’t know the difference." After three weeks, Ossorio visited Pollock's studio to inspect the painting. Ossorio was confronted with an artwork which was repainted onto fiberboard, with "new qualities of richness and depth" as a result of Pollock's "thorough but subtle repainting." Ossorio attested that the "original concept remained unmistakably present, but affirmed and fulfilled by a new complexity and depth of linear interplay. It was, and still is a masterful display of control and disciplined vision."

== Ownership ==
- Jackson Pollock: 1948 – January 1949
- Alfonso A. Ossorio: January 1949 – Unknown
- Samuel Irving Newhouse, Jr.: Unknown
- David Geffen: Unknown – November 2006
- Efthimios Hatzis

According to a report in The New York Times on November 2, 2006, the painting was sold by David Geffen, founder of Geffen Records and co-founder of DreamWorks SKG, to David Martinez, managing partner of Fintech Advisory Ltd, in a private sale for a record inflation-adjusted price of $140 million. It is speculated that Geffen sold the painting, along with two others, to raise enough funds to bid for the Los Angeles Times. The sale was reportedly brokered by Sotheby's auctioneer Tobias Meyer, however, the law firm of Shearman & Sterling, LLP, issued a press release on behalf of its client, David Martinez, to announce that contrary to recent articles in the press, Martinez did not own the painting or any rights to acquire it. In addition to the refutation issued by Shearman & Sterling, the auction expert Josh Baer indicated that Martinez was not the buyer of the painting.

== See also ==
- List of most expensive paintings
