= David Martínez (businessman) =

Mexican investor (born 1957)

- Born: May 1957 (age 69); Monterrey, Nuevo León, Mexico
- Education: Harvard Business School
- Occupation: businessman

David Manuel Martínez Guzmán (born 1957) is a Mexican, British, and Kittitian-Nevisian investor who is the founder and managing partner of Fintech Advisory. This firm specializes in corporate and sovereign debt. Fintech Advisory has offices in London and New York City, and he currently divides his time between those two cities.

Described as "the most influential Mexican on Wall Street," Martínez played a major role in the restructuring of Argentina's sovereign debt and described himself in 2013 as having participated in nearly every restructuring of sovereign debt during the previous 25 years. His investments have been characterized as extending "from New York to Patagonia." He is a major holder of assets in Argentina, with Fintech Media LLC, a subsidiary of Fintech Advisory, owning "more than a billion dollars in financial assets" in Argentina alone.

== Early life and education ==
David Martínez was born to Manuel Martínez and Julia Guzmán in Monterrey, Mexico. His family lived an average life until his father inherited a small fortune. Later, Martínez moved to Rome and enrolled in Legion of Christ Seminary to become a priest. After six months, he decided he was not suited for that vocation.

The New York Times has noted that Martínez's hometown, Monterrey, "is home to some of Mexico's largest industrial companies", with power being "heavily concentrated among businessmen in the so-called Group of 10, a club that includes the Sada family." Although Martínez "was not a part of that circle, he had cultivated deep connections to it," helping the Sadas in 2004, for example, when one of their firms went bankrupt, and, later, becoming involved in the bankruptcy of the Sada-owned firm Vitro. According to one source, Martínez's "paternal great-great-grandmother was the sister of the paternal grandfather of Adrian Sada."

"As a young man," according to The New York Times, Martínez "was a member of Regnum Christi, an evangelical group related to the Legionaries of Christ, an influential Roman Catholic order in Mexico that includes among its benefactors the billionaire Carlos Slim." After earning a degree in electrical engineering from Universidad Anahuac, he "moved to Rome to study philosophy at the Pontifical Gregorian University and considered becoming a priest." He soon decided, however, that he did not have a clerical vocation, and instead obtained a loan from a friend's father in order to study at Harvard Business School. There he excelled as a student, made important connections, and earned an MBA.

== Career ==
After receiving his MBA, Martínez worked for Citigroup, taking a position on the emerging markets desk in New York. At Citigroup, he began to work "with distressed debt in far-flung places." In 1985, he left Citigroup.

=== Fintech ===
When he turned 30 in 1987, Martínez started Fintech, reportedly with the help of a US$300,000 loan from his grandmother, which he was able to repay with interest within a year.

One of Martínez's most notable negotiations involved restructuring the debt of the Mexican chemicals and textile conglomerate Celulosa y Derivados, Sociedad Anónima (CYDSA), a company that had denied him a job when he was younger. CYDSA agreed to an exchange of debt for equity that would hand control of the company to creditors. Fintech bought US$400 million of CYDSA debt for US$40 million and thereby obtained 60% of the shares, taking control of the company from its founders, the Gonzalez Sada family.

=== Restructuring of Argentina's debt ===
Martínez has been heavily involved in the Argentinian economy for many years. In 1994, he "invested in the wrecked Argentinean economy by buying government bonds with a maturity of 37 years for $834 million."

"Fintech was one of the major participants in the exchange of 2005," wrote William Dahill, a lawyer for Martínez. "He realized that the only way" that Argentina could recover from its economic crisis "would be through a reduction of its liabilities, which would allow the economy to grow and the country regain a minimum level of creditworthiness." Between 2004 and 2006, according to Daniel Marx, a former Finance Secretary of Argentina, Martínez paid $100 million on the secondary market for Argentine bonds with a nominal value of $700 million.

His "wholesale" purchase of defaulted Argentinian bonds was considered an act of "loyalty" to Argentina by Kirchner and others. During Argentina's worst economic times, he bought into "almost all" of the country's large firms, "from Telecom to Transener."

== Ties to Kirchner family ==
Martínez has been described as being "closely linked" to the late Argentinian president Néstor Kirchner and as having been a "friend" of Kirchner's. According to one source, "whenever the former president traveled to the United States, he made a place in his schedule" for a meeting with Martínez. Describing Martínez as "Kirchner's Mexican friend," Italy's leading newspaper, Corriere della Sera, has noted that the rise in Martínez's economic fortunes "coincided with the exceptional political cavalcade of the Kirchners after the collapse of the South American country in December 2001."

It is known that Guillermo Nielsen, then Secretary of Finance under Nestor Kirchner, met Martínez in Dubai in September 2003 to discuss the restructuring of Argentina's debt, and that the two men met six to 10 more times in New York, London, and elsewhere to continue the conversation. Over time, the "relationship between Martínez and the Kirchner government became stronger." In 2006, Martínez met Kirchner himself at the Argentine Consulate in New York. Five days later, "Martínez purchased 40 % shares of Cablevisión, the cable television system of Grupo Clarin, the largest media company in Argentina. Martínez can be seen sitting in the front row of the audience in a video of the 2007 inauguration of Cristina Fernández de Kirchner.

=== Cablevisión ===
Martínez bought Cablevisión "without any concern for antitrust legislation," and did so at a time when Néstor Kirchner "decided to put his electoral campaign in the hands of Grupo Clarin" and allowed the purchase by Martínez of 50% of Cablevisión. In 2005, Kirchner signed a decree extending broadcast licenses by 10 years; on December 7, 2007, three days before leaving office, he signed a decree permitting the merger of Clarin and Martínez's Cablevisión. After Martínez's purchase of Telecom Argentina, it was noted that his ownership of major stakes in both this firm and Cablevisión is illegal under Argentinian law. "Martínez could be forced to sell Cablevisión," reported Corriere della Sera. "But Christina Kirchner will decide." As of 2014, he held 40 percent of Cablevisión.

=== Vitro ===
The New York Times reported on October 11, 2012, on Martínez's involvement in the bankruptcy of Vitro, a 103-year-old Mexican glassmaking firm run by the Sada family, an event that was surrounded by "Allegations of covert meetings, fraudulent debts and crooked courts" and that ended up with "the company in the hands of its shareholders, while costing bondholders as much as 60 percent of their investment."

The Times traced the story to 2009, when Martínez loaned Vitro $75 million in exchange for the title to several of its properties and an option to return them to Vitro later in exchange for a 24 percent stake in the firm. In 2010, Martínez "went to the different banks that Vitro owed money to and bought the claims," thus becoming the firm's "biggest individual outside creditor, owning about $600 million worth of claims." Vitro "began taking big loans from its subsidiaries, in effect creating a fresh class of creditors outside of the hedge funds — a group under its control, with the rights to approve any bankruptcy plan. Subsidiaries went from owing the parent company about $1.2 billion to being owed $1.5 billion." With Martínez's help, Vitro "outvoted many other bondholders to approve a reorganization plan" that paid creditors about 40 to 60 percent of what they were owed and kept the Sada family in control.

In response, American investor Paul Singer's firm, Elliott Associates, and other hedge funds, which together owned about $700 million of Vitro's old debt, claimed that Martínez had helped Vitro "muscle investors out of hundreds of millions of dollars through financial sleight of hand," and accused Vitro of "audacity, brazen manipulation and greed." Singer and the hedge funds sued Vitro and Fintech in the U.S., where a Dallas court ruled in their favor in summer 2012. An appellate court trial began in October.

This legal battle, reported the Times, was "drawing back a curtain on Mr. Martínez's secretive world" and "could have implications for other companies in the world's fastest-growing economies." Arturo Porzecanski, economist in residence at American University's School of International Service, told the Times that the case "highlighted apparent loopholes in the bankruptcy law of Mexico, through which Vitro ran an 18-wheel truck."

The Financial Times published an article by Martínez on March 7, 2013, in which he argued that Judge Griesa's "interference" might "make future sovereign restructurings impossible, setting a dangerous precedent for the world's financial system." Succumbing to "the demands of holdout creditors," wrote Martínez, Griesa had ordered the Argentinian government to pay them $1.3 billion. Noting that the "all sovereign restructurings" had been successful "partly because nations have most of their assets protected by law," Martínez characterized "holdout creditors" as "free riders" whom most nations pay off to avoid harassment; however, "Argentina's leadership, which knows how to fight, opted to defend itself against the world's most litigious funds, which now want to collect in full. These funds are seeking to reap the benefits of Buenos Aires' improved payment capacity – a result of the losses accepted by the vast majority during the restructuring." Martínez called it a "scandal" that Griesa was forcing this majority "to share the interest payments they accepted on their restructured bonds with the minority that litigated," an arrangement which would doubly punish "those who contributed in favour of those who did not." Martínez concluded: "Not only is Mr Griesa's decision unfair – it will also lead to society paying a price in the form of more protracted debt restructurings with less certain outcomes."

On March 11, the Financial Times ran a reply by Robert Shapiro of American Task Force Argentina, calling Martínez's article "a disservice to the FT's readers" and saying that Argentina's actions "pose the real threat to global finance." Shapiro explained that since Argentina's 2001 debt default, "the regimes of Néstor Kirchner and Christina Kirchner Fernandez have rejected every tenet of global finance. They refused to negotiate with bondholders, took four years to issue a 'take-it-or-leave-it' offer of 27 cents on the dollar or barely half the international norm, repudiated the debt of 25 per cent of bondholders who rejected that low-ball offer, and ignored more than 100 directives from US courts to honour their obligations." Rejecting Martínez's claim that Griesa had ordered "those who accepted the last restructuring...to 'share' what is owed to them," Shapiro stated that Griesa had "simply upheld Argentina's own original contract...and noted that under US law the Argentine government cannot choose to pay some creditors and not others." Shapiro commented that "The real victims of the Kirchners' long campaign to ignore their nation's obligations are the Argentine people," and quoted the recent statement by the Argentinian daily La Nación that "The main impediment for ending the conflict with the holdouts is that the government is prioritising the media battle with the creditors over channelling its energy towards seeking a technical solution."

=== Banco de Sabadell ===
In September 2013 it was reported that he had "bought 5 percent of Banco Sabadell"." He was appointed member of the Board of Directors on 27 March 2014 (re-elected on 19 April 2018).

=== Telecom Argentina ===
Bloomberg News reported on November 14, 2013, that Fintech Group had agreed to pay $860 million for Telecom Italia SpA's 68 percent holding in Sofora Telecomunicaciones, the controlling holding company of Telecom Argentina through Nortel Inversora, plus a direct minority stake, plus $100 million for related assets, for a total of $960 million. This deal pitted him "against the mobile-phone business of Carlos Slim in South America's second-biggest economy" and "expanded Martínez's bets beyond holdings such as cable assets and Argentina's sovereign debt as he seeks to benefit from increasing Web and video use on mobile devices."

Bloomberg reported that "Telecom Argentina and the local unit of fellow Mexican billionaire Slim's America Movil SAB (AMXL) each have about a third of the nation's wireless market." Noting that "Fintech has investments in Argentina's sovereign debt as well as in many restructured companies including a stake in the country's largest cable company, Cablevisión SA," Bloomberg quoted Martínez as saying, "We see tremendous opportunities for growth in the Argentine market and are committed to an important investment program to take advantage of those opportunities."

A The Wall Street Journal article, published on November 10, 2013, described Martínez's decision to invest in Argentina "an unusual call," given that "Argentina has been a cautionary tale for many investors since its 2001 default on $100 billion in sovereign debt" and that its last two presidents, Néstor Kirchner and Cristina Kirchner, had "repeatedly gone mano a mano with big business," nationalizing an oil company and seeking to force the Clarin media group to break up its business. The Journal described Martínez as "part of a small group of investors who are willing to overlook Argentina's status as a financial pariah and bet long term," in the expectation that "the next government to be more pragmatic and less hostile to business."

=== A joint exit ===
In March 2014 Martínez called together several representatives of funds with holdings in Argentine bonds, with the intention of beginning to negotiate a joint exit for the bondholders. José Luis Manzano, a media entrepreneur and former member of the Menem government, was also involved in the negotiations, and both he and Martínez "assured their partners that they had the approval of the Government" to negotiate a deal. Reportedly, Martínez had asked JP Morgan to come up with an attractive offer for the bonds.

=== Venezuela ===
In March 2017, his hedge fund, FinTech Advisory, considered a vulture fund, received bonds with a face value of $1.3 billion as collateral for a $300 million loan to Venezuela, helping the Venezuelan government sell assets amid international sanctions. Between April and June, Martinez traveled frequently to Venezuela on debt-related matters, traveling again in October to urge the government of Nicolas Maduro not to pay the accumulating payments on overdue bonds. Maduro decreed a debt restructuring days later. According to Bloomberg, this led the U.S. Treasury Department to investigate Martínez and consider sanctions for him as well.

In 2018, prior to Venezuela's currency reconversion that went into effect on August 20, Martinez contacted Latin American economists to advise Maduro's government, including former finance ministers under Ecuadorian President Rafael Correa, Patricio Rivera and Fausto Herrera. However, Martínez has denied his links to them.

An investigation by Armando.info reported that Venezuelan officials offered him to deliver bonds in their possession in exchange for participation in state-owned electricity company Corpolec in December 2018. It goes on to cite that the amount of Venezuelan debt held by Martinez, which although difficult to pinpoint, would be a significant amount between $3 billion and $10 billion. Opposition politicians and experts warned that Martínez's activities were "oxygenating" the Maduro government, and some met with him in an attempt to dissuade him.

== Art collection ==
Specializing in modern and contemporary works, David Martínez has been reported as also owning pieces by Mark Rothko, Pablo Picasso and Damien Hirst. In 2006 he reportedly set a record for the highest price paid for a piece of art with the purchase of a Jackson Pollock painting from David Geffen. Pollock's painting "No. 5, 1948" sold for US$140 million (£73m), on 1 November 2006. However, the auction expert Josh Baer stated that Martinez was not the buyer of the painting. In addition, Shearman & Sterling issued a press release on behalf of its client, David Martinez, to announce that contrary to articles in the press, Martinez does not own the painting or any rights to acquire it. In October 2012, however, The New York Times reported that despite these and other denials, "several people with knowledge of" Martínez's collection have said that the Pollock work hangs in his New York apartment.

Martínez was identified as the seller of a Mark Rothko's Untitled (1961) at Sotheby's in a 2010 lawsuit against him by Dallas art collector Marguerite Hoffman, who claimed breach of contract. Hoffman sold him the work privately in 2007 for a net $17.6 million, forgoing the $30 million to $40 million she said the painting could have fetched at public auction. She later said the deal's privacy agreement was broken when Studio Capital Inc., a Belize-registered company she claimed is controlled by Martínez "for the purpose of maintaining the secrecy of his purchases and sales of art," entered the Rothko in Sotheby's May 2010 auction in New York and marketing materials revealed her prior ownership. She claimed she could have sold the painting at auction herself and received far more, had she not wanted secrecy. The painting was auctioned for $31.4 million.

Martínez was included in the 2012 ARTnews list of the world's 200 Top Collectors. In 2014, he sold Francis Bacon's Portrait of George Dyer Talking (1966), for $70 million to an American collector at Christie's London.

== Personal life ==
It described Martínez's residence in the Time Warner Center (80 Columbus Circle) as "one of the most expensive apartments in Manhattan," purchased in 2003 for "about $42 million." His New York apartment "over 15,000SF combo apartment that spans on the 76th & 77th floors. Has a two-story living room and a reflecting pool," and a "special system has been rigged to support one exceptionally heavy piece of art."

The Mexican media refer to Martínez as a "ghost investor." One source calls him "a discreet man" who despite his massive investments remains widely "unknown." Reportedly, only one photograph of him can be found on the Internet, which was taken by Kirchner's photographer, Bugge Victor, the official photographer for Argentina presidency, at Argentina's consulate in New York. "There is barely any news about his moves, or pictures of him on the Internet," reported IB Times. "There is no estimate of his wealth, although many have said that he is following in the footsteps of fellow Mexican tycoon Carlos Slim to become the richest man in the world."

According to The New York Times, "Martínez is, even to his associates, something of a mystery," a man about whom "Little is known in life as in business, Mr. Martínez treads lightly. He is fond of shell companies, whether to buy artwork or to pay household expenses. Those he hires often know him only as 'the client.'". Noting that "it is unclear" how much money Fintech controls, "or even how many employees work there," the Times has reported that when Elliott Associates and other funds sought to sue Fintech, they "encountered one obstacle early on: they couldn't find Mr. Martínez," either at Fintech's Park Avenue offices or at his Time Warner Center apartment.

Martínez reportedly "travels to Monterrey every Christmas to be with his mother, Juliana Guzman Sepulveda, and his sister, Beatriz Martínez Guzmán." In 1997 he "bought a plot of 874 square meters in the municipality of San Pedro Garza Garcia," on which his mother now lives.
