= Ruthe Farmer =

American policymaker and activist

- Ruthe Farmer, Founder & CEO of Last Mile Education Fund. Photo by Ruthe Farmer (RutheF08) on Wikimedia Commons. November, 17 2021.
- Occupations: Policymaker, activist
- Years active: 2001–
- Known for: Computer science education
- Website: https://www.ruthefarmer.com/

Ruthe Farmer is an American policymaker and activist. She is focused on inclusion and leveraging existing infrastructure to scale change for girls' participation in technology and engineering. She is the founder and CEO of the Last Mile Education Fund--"a non-profit organization that helps lower-income students in technical fields complete their college degrees"--and formerly served as the Chief Evangelist for CSforALL. She was a senior policy advisor for tech inclusion at the White House Office of Science and Technology Policy in the Obama administration and Chief Strategy and Growth Officer at the National Center for Women & Information Technology.

== Background ==
Farmer attended Lewis & Clark College between 1988 and 1992, where she received a B.A. in Communications and German. She attended the Saïd Business School at Oxford University between 2007 and 2008, where she received a M.B.A. in Social Entrepreneurship.

== Career ==
Farmer worked for the Girl Scouts between 2001 and 2007 as a program manager for STEM education and was a founding committee member of the Oregon Robotics and Tournament Outreach Program, a successful FIRST Lego League program. She was chair of the 2012 Computer Science Education Week and subsequently became the Director of Strategic Initiatives for the NCWIT between 2008 and 2016. Farmer was named a "Champion of Change for Technology Inclusion" by the White House in 2013 and won the Anita Borg Institute's 2014 Social Impact ABIE award, and was named among the "Forty Over 40 Women to Watch in America" in 2015. Between 2016 through the end of the Obama administration in January 2017, Farmer was the Senior Policy Advisor for Tech Inclusion at the White House Office of Science and Technology Policy with a focus on implementing the Obama administration's CS for All initiative with an emphasis on including under-represented groups. She now (2018) serves as the Chief Evangelist for CSforALL. In 2020, during the pandemic, she launched the Last Mile Education Fund to respond to the needs of low-income students pursuing degrees in tech and engineering fields.
