= CSforALL =

Computer Science For All (CSforALL) (formerly the CSforALL Consortium) is an American nonprofit organization dedicated to expanding access to computer science (CS) education, to empower students, from pre-K to 12th grade, to learn computer science (CS) and computational thinking (CT) skills. CSforALL was established in 2016 as a national consortium funded by the National Science Foundation (NSF). The organization coordinates educators, researchers, school districts, nonprofit organizations, government agencies, and industry partners working to make computer science an integral part of preK-12 education in the United States. CSforALL developed from the New York City Foundation for Computer Science Education (CSNYC) and the national Computer Science for All movement which gained prominence during the administration of President Barack Obama.

== History ==
The origins for CSforALL trace back to efforts in the early 2010s to expand computer science education in public schools; while there were prior CS initiatives and courses, computer science was not consistently available in K-12 schools and participation varied across geographic regions and demographic groups.

With support from philanthropy and technology companies, the New York City Foundation for Computer Science Education (CSNYC) was founded by investor Fred Wilson and established in 2013 to expand CS instruction throughout NYC public schools. CSNYC supported the development of NYC's ten-year Computer Science for All (CS4All) initiative, which sought to make computer science education available to approximately 1.1 million public school students. The initiative was announced by mayor Bill de Blasio in September 2015.

The CSforALL Consortium was formally announced on September 14, 2016 by Ruthe Farmer at the White House Summit on Computer Science for All. The consortium began "with 188 members and grew to close to 800 members in 2021, consisting of 664 institutions and 127 individual researchers." Those numbers have increased to 1,400+ organizational commitments, hundreds of SCRIPT facilitators, 8,800 districts, over 1 million students, and over 2 million parents nationwide. WestEd states that in 2022, CSforALL "became a funded Broadening Participation in Computing Alliance (BPC-A)."

These developments coincided with the growth and spread of CSEdWeek (launched in 2010), the CS10KProject, and the growth of a national coalition of organizations promoting computer science education, including Code.org, the Computer Science Teachers Association (CSTA), the National Center for Women & Information Technology (NCWIT), the Association for Computing Machinery (ACM), and the College Board.

In 2025, CSforALL and Code.org partnered together for Unlock8, an initiative to support CS & AI education, awareness, and training for students across the United States." The name Unlock 8 refers to the finding that students of any focus who take at least one computer science course earn 8% more. The initiative gained support from 250+ CEOs (from companies including Adobe, AMD, Dell, IBM, Khan Academy, Microsoft, Yahoo!, and Zoom), and included the launch of "Hour of AI."
