= Computer Science Teachers Association =

Professional association

Computer Science Teachers Association (CSTA)
- Founded: 2004
- Purpose: Computer Science Education
- Region served: International
- Key people: Chris Stephenson (Founder); Jake Baskin (Executive Director)
- Website: www.csteachers.org

The Computer Science Teachers Association (CSTA) is a professional association. Started in 2004, CSTA is a membership organization.

CSTA supports computer science teachers with educational information.

== History ==
In January 2005, the Association of Computing Machinery (ACM) announced the formation of the Computer Science Teachers Association (CSTA), an organization dedicated to supporting teachers and pursuing excellence in computing education for students. CSTA evolved from ACM’s K-12 Task Force, a five-year effort launched in 1999 to determine the extent of and remedy, a perceived crisis in high school computer science education in the US. CSTA was established as a Limited Liability Company under the auspices of ACM. Initially, CSTA was governed by a volunteer Steering Committee, but over time it transitioned to a fully-elected Board of Directors. This transition included the development of organizational by-laws, and eventually, a Policy and Procedures Manual. The by-laws defined the organization’s purpose and processes including membership types, staffing, and financial operations. The by-laws were further refined in 2011 and 2013.

In 1999, computer science as an academic subject was deeply misunderstood. Administrative support was weak, financial support was being reduced, and teachers had few (if any) opportunities to develop and improve their technical and teaching skills. Additionally, there was no standard curriculum to direct their efforts or measure student learning. Given its unique relationship with ACM, CSTA was created to address these needs, the most pressing of which was to clearly articulate the importance of computer science to education and to the US’s long-term economic competitiveness. CSTA also served as a bridge between high school teachers and post-secondary faculty and institutions, helping to repair a relationship that had become fraught due to curriculum disagreements and falling enrollments.

In 2003, following the first meeting of a steering committee composed of computer science teachers and faculty members, Chris Stephenson (who was to become CSTA’s first Executive Director and led the association until 2014) delivered a proposal to the ACM Executive Council proposing the formation of CSTA. This proposal set forth nineteen milestones for the organization’s first year. These milestones were designed to grow, promote, and support membership and to ensure CSTA’s sustainability. ACM’s agreement to support this proposal included the provision of annual funding and staff support and led to an official launch of CSTA in January 2005.

In August 2025, CSTA submitted and received a National Science Foundation grant entitled Supporting K-12 Computer Science Education through the Establishment of a National Discipline-Based Professional Association. The proposal, approved by NSF program officer Janice E. Cuny, PhD, was the first of several NSF grants CSTA led and in which it participated. Early funding for CSTA was also provided by ACM and a number of corporate sponsors including Google, Microsoft, and Sun Microsystems.

=== Curriculum ===
In 2003 the ACM K–12 Task Force published “A Model Curriculum for K-12 Computer Science: Final Report of the ACM K-12 Task Force Committee” which outlined the first set of comprehensive computer science learning standards for U.S. secondary schools. Over time, CSTA has continued to update its standards, expanding them to cover all of K–12 and to reflect changes in computing technology and students’ learning needs. The Model Curriculum was the first of many early technical and curriculum reports CSTA published detailing various issues in CS education between 2004 and 2014. These seminal publications articulated challenges in areas such as curriculum, equity, teacher certification, teacher preparation, and teacher professionalization.

=== Professional Development ===
In 2000, the ACM K–12 Task Force launched the first annual Computer Science and Information Technology Symposia (CSIT) in Atlanta. This one-day event was designed to offer teachers an opportunity to access professional development on a wide range of technical and pedagogical topics. It was also designed to provide computer science teachers an opportunity to experience belonging to a large and supportive professional community. CSTA continued to offer and expand CSIT until 2012 when it was officially renamed as the CSTA Annual Conference.

In 2003 and 2004, the Task Force also launched the Java Engagement for Teacher Training (JETT) which offered teacher workshops focused on helping AP Computer Science teachers transition from teaching with the Pascal programming language to Java. The workshops were offered across the U.S. in partnership universities and ACM chapters.

=== Teacher Leadership ===
CSTA was the first organization to begin training and organizing K–12 computer science teachers as advocates for the discipline. In 2008, CSTA received a grant to facilitate the development of a cohort of K-12 educational leaders (the CSTA K-12 Leadership Cohort) who could effectively advocate for computer science education at the local, state, and national level with the particular focus of establishing K-12 computer science as an essential academic discipline. The workshops were designed to enhance teacher leadership and advocacy skills and to provide ongoing support for their development as leaders in their local communities. Participants were also encouraged to work toward organizing local and state chapters of CSTA to serve as a source of information about local and state issues affecting K-12 CS education, an active advocacy group, and a framework around which CSTA could provide more localized services and broaden membership.

Within the first year, Leadership Cohort members in many states conducted advocacy events for state level education leaders (e.g. MD and WI) district superintendents, school principals (e.g.CA), and businesses (WI). They were also instrumental in establishing early CSTA local chapters in the following areas: Arizona, Buffalo, Chicago, Houston, Southeastern Virginia, Ohio, Pennsylvania, Southern California, and Southern New Jersey Shore. When Code.org was launched in 2013, CSTA-trained teacher leaders carried out the majority of the local advocacy efforts on its behalf.

== Key Programming ==
CSTA has launched multiple programs in order to support computer science teachers.

CSTA Annual Conference - CSTA has hosted an annual conference every year since 2000. The conference was originally called the Computer Science & Information Technology Symposium (CS&IT). Now, the conference title is simply CSTA plus the current year (i.e., CSTA 2024). The conference brings thousands of computer science educators together for a week in July to learn from hundreds of educational sessions.

Computer Science Education Week (CSEdWeek) is an annual event designed to inspire K-12 students to learn computer science, advocate for equity, and celebrate the contributions of students, teachers, and partners to the field. The first CSEdWeek was launched by ACM on December 6–12, 2009. It was a joint effort led and funded by ACM with the cooperation and deep involvement of CSTA, NCWIT, the National Science Foundation (NSF), the Anita Borg Institute (ABI), the Computing Research Association (CRA), Google, Inc., Intel, and Microsoft. ACM’s Education Policy Committee worked closely with Congressmen Vernon Ehlers (R-MI) and Jared Polis (D-CO) to introduce a Congressional Resolution recognizing the first CSEdWeek. Congressman Ehlers introduced the resolution after being alerted to declining enrollments in computer science studies by Professor Joel Adams of the Department of Computer Science at Calvin College. The intent is CSEdWeek will be celebrated each year during the week of Grace Hopper’s birthday (December 9, 1906), who invented the first compiler and coined the term “bug” (an error in a program) after removing an actual moth from a computer in 1947. CSTA became the lead organizer for CSEdWeek in 2020.

Computer Science Honor Society (CSHS) - CSTA offers high school teachers across the United States the opportunity to create local Computer Science Honor Societies. The program originated at CodeVA, and was elevated to the national level by CSTA. There are currently more than 200 active local chapters.

The CSTA Equity Fellowship is a selective, year-long program designed to develop leadership in equitable teaching practices and advocacy. The program provides leadership development opportunities to the fellows and identifies opportunities for the group to develop ongoing, peer-to-peer professional learning experiences focused on addressing issues of equity in the computer science classrooms for all CSTA members.

CSTA Affinity Groups connect CSTA members who share a common identity or interest. CSTA Affinity Groups host events, connect year-round via the CSTA Virtual Community, and offer opportunities for members to meet with one another at CSTA’s in-person and virtual events.

== Awards ==
Together with the Association for Computing Machinery (ACM), the CSTA offers the ACM/CSTA Cutler-Bell Prize in High School Computing. The award provides four $10,000 scholarships to each of four winners along with the opportunity for the students to present their projects at the CSTA Annual Conference and/or at one of CSTA’s virtual summits. The prize was established to honor outstanding high school seniors who want to pursue advanced studies in computer science or technology. This program aims to promote and encourage computer science.

The CS Teaching Excellence Award honors K–12 computer science educators whose commitment and excellence have aided the development of CS education and technology the award grants $7,500 to national winners, and $2,500 to honorable mentions.

== Computer Science Education Standards ==
The CSTA K–12 Computer Science Standards delineate a core set of learning objectives designed to provide the foundation for a complete computer science curriculum and its implementation at the K–12 level.

CSTA also created and published Standards for CS Teachers. These Standards are designed to provide clear guidance around effective and equitable CS instruction in support of rigorous CS education for all K–12 students.

== Research and Publications ==
CSTA partners with many other organizations to conduct research on the state of CS education in the United States. Recent publications include:

Reimagining CS Pathways

Reimagining CS Pathways is a community-wide project that explores how CS learning opportunities can be re-envisioned for high school students. CSTA and IACE co-led the project, in partnership with ACM, Code.org, College Board, CSforALL, and ECEP Alliance.

Annual State of Computer Science Education report

The annual report on K-12 computer science in the United States provides an update on national and state-level computer science education policy, including policy trends, maps, state summaries, and implementation data.

Landscape Survey of PreK-12 Computer Science Teachers in the United States

The survey is sent out every two years in order to understand the current landscape of PreK-12 CS teachers, including their demographics, teaching background, school context, professional development, instructional practice, and knowledge of and use of culturally responsive teaching practices. The 2022 report sought an understanding of teachers’ perceptions of how to move towards a vision of equitable CS. This report drew on a national sample of PreK-12 CS teachers to examine their views of both their professional development needs and institutional changes required to transform CS classrooms to be more identity-inclusive.

== Governance ==
CSTA’s Board of Directors consists of 14 voting representatives, with 11 of those elected directly by CSTA’s membership.

Board Positions

- Board Chair
- Board Chair-Elect
- Treasurer
- School District Representative
- At-Large Representative
- International Representative
- State Department Representative
- Teacher Education Representative
- Partner Representative, Microsoft
- K-8 Teacher Representative (2)
- 9–12 Representative (2)
- University Representative

== See also ==
- Association for Computing Machinery
- Computer science
- Education
