= Anne Dias-Griffin =

French-American investor

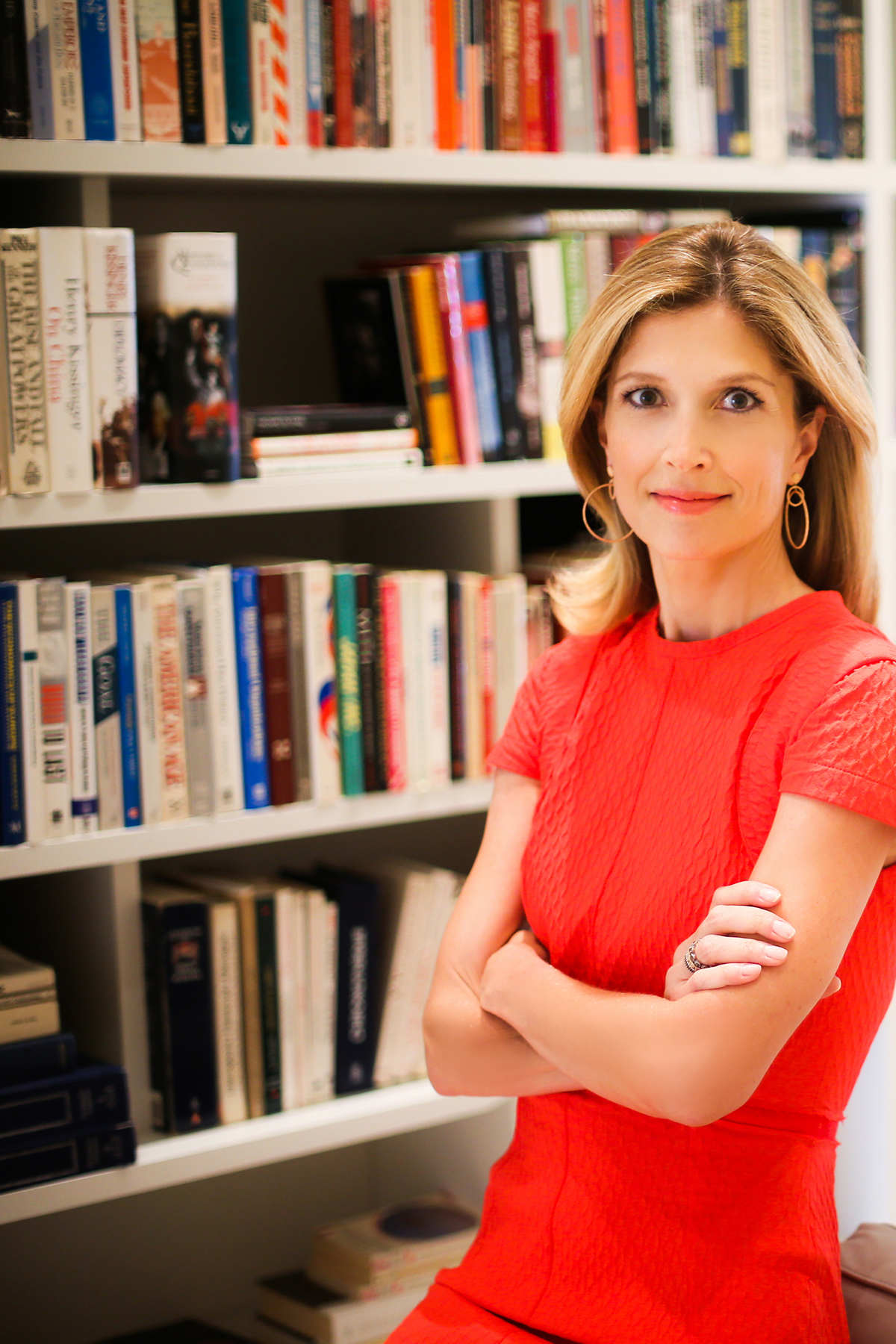
- Dias in 2014
- Born: Anne Dias; Strasbourg, France
- Education: Georgetown University (BSFS); Harvard University (MBA)
- Occupation: Hedge fund manager
- Spouse: Kenneth C. Griffin (m. 2003; div. 2015)
- Children: 3

Anne Dias-Griffin is a French-American investor. She is the founder and chief executive officer of Aragon, an investment firm active in global equities, with a focus on the internet, technology, and consumer sectors, as well as alternative assets.

== Early life and education ==
Dias was born in Strasbourg, France. She moved to the United States to study at the Georgetown University School of Foreign Service in 1992. She graduated summa cum laude and received an MBA from Harvard Business School.

Dias worked full-time in public policy research during college, on both domestic and foreign policy issues. She was a research assistant to constitutional law scholar Walter Berns, the Olin Professor of Government at Georgetown University, and helped research a book on the Electoral College. She also assisted Patrick J. Glynn, resident scholar at the American Enterprise Institute, on his book about the history of the Cold War.

In 1991, she was the Brussels representative for the American Electronics Association, and focused on European policy issues. She also worked on European Community and foreign policy issues as an intern at the German Parliament in Bonn and Berlin during the summer of 1992.

== Investment career ==
=== Early career ===
After receiving her degree from Georgetown University, Anne worked as an analyst in the Investment Banking department of Goldman Sachs in London and New York City and at Fidelity International in London.

After obtaining her MBA from Harvard Business School in 1997, she joined Soros Fund Management as an analyst and was promoted to portfolio manager one year later.

At Soros, she specialized in the retail and financial services industry and managed a long/short portfolio of financial services stocks. Dias was a member of the founding investment team at Viking Global Investors, focusing on global media and internet investments.

=== Aragon Global Management ===
In 2001, Dias started her own fund, Aragon Global Management, LLC in New York City. Billionaire Julian Robertson of Tiger Management provided start-up capital for Aragon.

Dias ran Aragon as a long/short hedge fund until 2010, when she returned all third-party capital to manage her own money. At the end of 2011, Dias returned capital from outside investors to focus on the Kenneth and Anne Griffin Foundation, and ran Aragon as a family office. Aragon re-opened to third-party capital in June 2021.

In 2022, Dias was named as one of the Barron's 100 Most Influential Women in U.S. Finance.

=== Board memberships ===
As of 2023, Dias sits on the board of Fox Corporation. She is also a member of the board of directors at the French-American Foundation in New York.

== Donations ==
=== Kenneth and Anne Griffin Foundation ===
Dias was co-president of the Kenneth and Anne Griffin Foundation, which she co-founded in 2009; it was dissolved in 2014 due to the couple's divorce. The foundation focused on early childhood education, the arts, and medical research, with particular emphasis on the health of women and children. The Griffins pledged more than $100 million to leading innovators and entrepreneurs whose initiatives are bringing measurable and sustainable change to the community. Dias organized a national conference on early childhood education every year in Chicago for teachers, academic researchers and public policy experts.

In 2006, Dias and Griffin gave $19 million to the Art Institute of Chicago, and in 2009, the Griffins donated $10 million to establish the Griffin Early Childhood Center.

In 2010, they donated $16 million to the Ann & Robert H. Lurie Children's Hospital of Chicago at Northwestern University to create an Emergency Care Center, which opened in 2012.

== Teaching ==
Dias is an adjunct professor at Georgetown University's McDonough School of Business where she teaches a course on hedge fund strategies. The class straddles theoretical teachings and practical applications of the hedge fund industry. Guest speakers have come from the world's top investment firms, including Elliott Associates, Tiger Global, Citadel, Carnegie Corporation, Monticello, Coatue, Paulson & Co., Magnetar and Viking.

== Media ==
In 2012, Dias launched Reboot Illinois, a news website and social media platform focused on Illinois politics, with over 650,000 monthly page views. During Dias’ ownership, Reboot Illinois was the recipient of multiple journalism awards. She sold her interest in the site to AFK Media Group in 2016.

== Personal life ==
Dias was born in France to a Franco-Argentine father and Franco-German mother. She married hedge fund manager Kenneth Griffin in 2003. In 2015, Griffin and Dias divorced. The couple has joint custody over their three children. As of 2023, both Griffin and Dias live in Miami, Florida, after moving their business operations from Chicago.

Dias is a Republican, and has donated to campaign funds for various candidates. During the 2022 midterms, Dias and Griffin donated $48 million to Republican groups.

== Awards ==
Dias has been named as one of the most powerful women in finance by multiple publications, including U.S. Banker, and The Hedge Fund Journal. In 2006, she was featured in Crain's Chicago Business' "40 Under 40" list and Institutional Investor's "20 Rising Stars of Hedge Funds". Dias won the Harvard Club of Chicago's Annual Alumni Award in 2010.
