= History of the Great War =

Official record of the British war effort during the First World War

History of the Great War Based on Official Documents by Direction of the Committee of Imperial Defence
- Title page of Military Operations, France and Belgium, 1914: Mons, the Retreat to the Seine, the Marne and the Aisne August–October 1914 (3rd revised edition, 1937) Volumes: Principal Events, 1914–1918; Military Operations; The Occupation of Constantinople 1918–1923; The Occupation of the Rhineland 1918–1929; Order of Battle of Divisions; Statistics of the Military Effort of the British Empire During the Great War, 1914–1920; Transportation on the Western Front, 1914–1918; The War in the Air; Naval Operations; Seaborne Trade; The Merchant Navy; History of the Ministry of Munitions; Medical and veterinary; Additional volumes; Authors: James Edmonds; Walter Raleigh; Henry Jones; Julian Corbett; Henry Newbolt; Archibald Hurd; Charles Fayle; Archbald Bell; William Macpherson; Thomas Mitchell; G. M. Smith; William Leishman; Stevenson Cummins; W. P. Herringham; T. R. Elliott; A. Balfour; Anthony Bowlby; Cuthbert Wallace; Crisp English; Layton Blenkinsop; John Rainey
- Illustrator: Archibald Frank Becke (maps)
- Country: Britain
- Language: English
- Discipline: Military history Publishers: HMSO; Macmillan; Longmans; John Murray; Heinemann; Naval & Military Press; Ray Westlake Books; Clarendon Press
- Published: 1922–1949; 1990s; 2000s
- Media type: Print (some online scans later)
- No. of books: c. 108

The History of the Great War Based on Official Documents by Direction of the Committee of Imperial Defence (abbreviated to History of the Great War or British Official History) is a series of 109 volumes, concerning the war effort of the British state during the First World War. It was produced by the Historical Section of the Committee of Imperial Defence from 1915 to 1949; after 1919 Brigadier-General Sir James Edmonds was Director. Edmonds wrote many of the army volumes and influenced the choice of historians for the navy, air force, medical and veterinary volumes. Work had begun on the series in 1915 and in 1920, the first volumes of Naval Operations and Seaborne Trade, were published. The first "army" publication, Military Operations: France and Belgium 1914 Part I and a separate map case were published in 1922 and the final volume, The Occupation of Constantinople was published in 2010.

The History of the Great War Military Operations volumes were originally intended as a technical history for military staff. Single-volume popular histories of military operations and naval operations written by civilian writers were to be produced for the general public but Sir John Fortescue was dismissed for slow work on the military volume and his draft was not published. Edmonds preferred to appoint half-pay and retired officers, who were cheaper than civilian writers and wrote that occasionally "the 'War House' foisted elderly officers on him, because they were not going to be promoted or offered employment but was afraid to tell them so".

In the 1987 introduction to Operations in Persia 1914–1919, G. M. Bayliss wrote that the guides issued by Her Majesty's Stationery Office (HMSO) were incomplete. "Sectional List number 60" of 1976 omitted the Gallipoli volumes but contained The Blockade of the Central Empires (1937), that had been Confidential and retained "For Official Use Only" until 1961. The twelve volume History of the Ministry of Munitions, the Occupation of the Rhineland (1929) and Operations in Persia 1914–1919 (1929) were included. The Imperial War Museum Department of Printed Books and the Battery Press republished the official history in the 1990s with black and white maps. The Imperial War Museum Department of Printed Books and the Naval & Military Press republished the set in paperback with colour maps in the 2000s and on DVD-ROM in the 2010s.

== Background ==
=== Official history ===
The modern form of official military history began in the mid-nineteenth century with reports written as guides for later officers. The histories were detailed descriptions of events, were not easy reading for a lay audience and left judgements to the discretion of a mainly professional readership. After the First World War, the New Zealand government decided that its official histories should be written for the public, since it had fought in the war or supported the war effort. After the Second World War, the low academic standard of military education, especially in historical analysis, led to a view that professionally trained historians should write official histories, applying their academic training to explain why as well as describe what. Since many of the academics had participated in the war, they could be expected to have experience of military service and knowledge of the war to inform their writing. The contemporary view is that official history should incorporate the three points of view, containing the detailed description needed for works of military instruction but also to be suitable for a general readership and to show how participants tried to solve problems, drawing explicit lessons from their successes and failures.

None of the points of view to be served by the production of official history is immune to error, because work by a military historian can be fraudulent, distorting the record for personal or political reasons. Populist history can dilute the story to the point of worthlessness and civilian academics can be prone to select facts and interpretations according to their ideals, ideology and preconceived ideas. Military histories written as textbooks might be expected to have a basis in truth, necessary to teach useful lessons to students and the British Report of the Committee on the Lessons of the Great War (Kirk Report, 1931) drew on the published volumes of the British official history; conclusions in the report were incorporated into a new edition of Field Service Regulations. Operations might again be conducted in Iraq and Iran and official history volumes were produced against the objections of the Foreign Office. Military histories concentrated on the doings of national contingents, rarely referring to those of allied and opposing armies; comparative analysis is absent and national bias, due to ulterior motives like the temptation to myth-make, can also be found. The Australian Official History of Australia in the War of 1914–1918 edited by Charles Bean contains exaggerations of the significance of the Australian contribution, the prowess of Australian soldiers and disparagements of soldiers from Britain and its allies. Australian failures and casualties are sometimes blamed on British higher commanders, when high-ranking Australian officers could justly be criticised.

After the First World War, the Royal Air Force (RAF) needed to justify its existence with a function that could not be fulfilled by the army or navy. The parts of The War in the Air (1922–1937) written by H. A. Jones gave undue emphasis to strategic bombing, unbalancing the work. Embarrassing events could be disguised by underwriting and in the French official history Histoire de La Grande Guerre, the French Army Mutinies of 1917 were passed over in a few paragraphs, despite occurring in 43 per cent of the French Army. Many of the historians, editors and contributors to the History of the Great War (1915–1949) had been senior officers during the war, which had the advantage of bringing first-hand knowledge of events and experience of military art to the work but risked allowing loyalty and an understandable desire to protect reputations leading to unfair blaming, particularly on outsiders.

The narrative of the Battle of Jutland (1916) is found in Volume III of the Royal Navy history Naval Operations (1923). The draft text was revised at the request of some serving officers present at the battle to remove critical remarks about them. Many of these officers were retired or dead when a revised edition was published in 1940 but the excised passages were not restored. The British Army Military Operations.... volumes have been criticised for dishonesty, in not blaming GHQ for the extent of British casualties. The authors have been accused of exculpating Field Marshal Sir Douglas Haig, commander of the British Expeditionary Force (BEF) from December 1915 to the end of the war, by default. In 2011, Neil Wells wrote that as the history is a description of events, rather than an analytical work with criticism and conclusions, Haig and other commanders escape explicit blame for failures, yet the reader is left free to form conclusions.

=== British official history ===
In 1906, official histories were being written by three departments at the War Office and one in the Admiralty. Lord Esher, a member of the Committee of Imperial Defence, suggested that a subcommittee be established as the Historical Section, to centralise the collection of army and navy archives, as a repository of the lessons of war for strategists. Esher thought that the lessons of the South African War (11 October 1899 – 31 May 1902) could not be shown unless the naval, military and political aspects of the war were treated as one. In January 1907, the subcommittee was established with Sir George Clarke as chairman, charged with the completion of an official history of the Boer War. The original account was begun by Colonel George Henderson (1854–1903), before ill health forced him to retire. Before he died, Henderson had completed a narrative up to the beginning of the war but it was not published. A later version, (History of the War in South Africa 1899–1902, four volumes, 1906–1910) by Major-General Frederick Maurice reached publication but Maurice had needed a large number of assistants which increased the price of the book; it was favourably received but did not sell well.

=== Histories of the Great War ===
In August 1914, the Historical Section was busy on a history of the Russo-Japanese War (8 February 1904 – 5 September 1905) and work was suspended on the outbreak of the First World War. The section began to collect material being returned from France and Lieutenant-Colonel E. Y. Daniel was appointed as full-time Secretary. (Note: Daniel retired in 1939, at the age of 74.) Experience of writing the history of the South African war showed that delay made the task impossible and that the collection of material for the work should begin at once. In May 1915, Captain Christopher Atkinson was sent to France to collect unit diaries. Atkinson reported that the diaries were inadequate, because of the difficulty of writing them during events like the Great Retreat of 1914, when few were kept and those that were had big gaps. Although the diaries would not show why events occurred, Atkinson recommended that they should be indexed and grouped by unit, subject and chronology for later scrutiny to identify discrepancies caused by the organisation of the material.

A formal decision to write an official history was taken in a Cabinet meeting on 26 August 1915, when Maurice Hankey (1 April 1877 – 26 January 1963) the Secretary of the Committee of Imperial Defence and of the War Council, advocated a series of histories to provide

...a popular and authoritative guide for the general reader; for the purposes of professional reference and education [and to provide] an antidote to the usual unofficial histories which besides being generally inaccurate, habitually attribute all naval and military failures to the ineptitude of the Government.

Field Marshal Herbert Kitchener (24 June 1850 – 5 June 1916) the Secretary of State for War wanted work begun on a single-volume popular history, to be published soon after the war. This would maintain public interest in the main series and put the case of the government at the same time as accounts by participants and popular authors. The Treasury objected over the cost but Hankey considered that it would be a work of education and reference, not a commercial proposition and that if scientific works were judged only on commercial criteria, research would be abolished.

The Treasury gave way and agreed to finance an official history series and popular single-volume works, written by civilian authors, to ensure public appeal. Sir Julian Corbett (12 November 1854 – 21 September 1922) was appointed to write the navy volume and Sir John Fortescue (28 December 1859 – 22 October 1933) was chosen for the army volume. Work on the military histories was slow and in 1917, Daniel reported that Atkinson and an assistant had examined only 160 of 1,100 unit diaries and that the Fortescue narrative had only reached as far as November 1914. The war precluded a big increase in manpower and for the Fortescue volume to be adequate, Daniel reported that confidential staff correspondence would be needed. With the huge increase in the size of the British army, it would only be practical to use some unit diaries and care would be needed to avoid skewing their selection. In March 1919, Winston Churchill (30 November 1874 – 24 January 1965) received a draft copy of the Corbett popular history of the navy and objected to certain passages. Churchill wanted official records to be published with the volume so that readers could judge for themselves. Hankey claimed that Churchill's objections made the publication of an official history series questionable, since they would inevitably reflect on leaders, many of whom were still in public life.

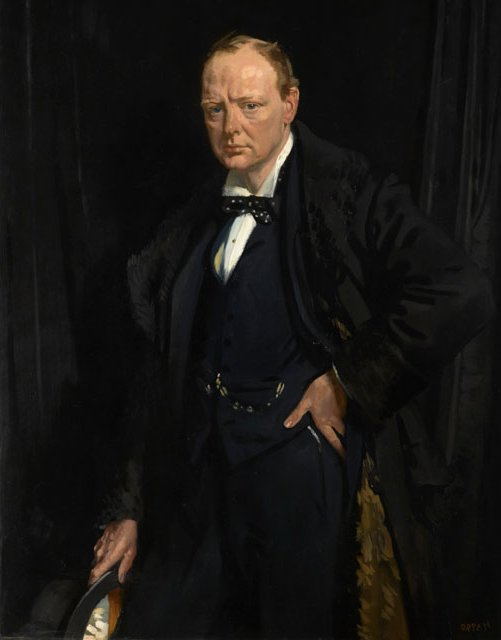
Portrait of Winston Churchill by William Orpen, 1916

Hankey wrote that an official history should not be written, because it would attract parliamentary and public criticism, the length of time taken to publish would mean that each volume would be examined and that the history would be produced at a loss. The experience of producing the navy volume also showed that each publication would

...run the gauntlet of departmental criticism which [was] apt to emasculate the work and deprive it of half its interest.

— Hankey

but the objections were not enough to cancel the project, given the benefits of publication. The public knew little of the early stages of the war and it had a right to benefit from the state monopoly on official information, presented in a readable manner. An official history would also serve to educate professional officers, considerations that mattered more than cost and that criticism was unavoidable. Publication would rebut unofficial histories that blamed the government or individual officers and for this, the histories could not evade controversy or be inoffensive to individual sensibilities. The Cabinet agreed for publication to continue, subject to vetting by the War Office and the Cabinet, with the proviso that the decision might be reversed if the Corbett volume was badly received; the volume was published in 1920 to extremely good press reviews. Work on the military histories in 1919 was hampered by paucity of resources and bad management, until Brigadier-General James Edmonds (25 December 1861 – 2 August 1956), who had joined the Historical Section in February 1919, was appointed Director on 1 April. Edmonds found documents in un-catalogued bundles on the floor, from which historians had abstracted items and not replaced them.

The Fortescue volume was to have covered the war but he wrote so slowly that it was decided to end his volume at May 1915 and only cover France. (Note: Captain G. S. Gordon had been employed in January, to cover events to December 1915 and to add the Dardanelles campaign but had disappeared to Gallipoli in June and written nothing.) Edmonds also came to doubt the quality of the work, judging Fortescue to be ignorant of the workings of a contemporary army, apparently being 200 years behind the times; Fortescue had excluded dates and times and used obsolete language; he agreed to revise his draft but then took no notice, his second draft being confused, containing nothing about the general situation and hardly referring to the Germans. Senior officers were ridiculed, the government blamed for not stopping the war and the French effort was "slurred over in less than one typewritten page". Edmonds blamed Fortescue for lack of interest, lethargy and ignoring the records made available, bungling the chance to write an exciting story of the BEF by delivering a patchwork of unit diaries. At the end of the year, Edmonds decided to rewrite the work because of Fortescue's prevarication and "grossly inaccurate and misleading" writing; Fortescue was sacked and Edmonds even wanted him to be made to pay back his salary. After the unfortunate experience with Fortescue, Edmonds decided that an account must be enhanced by statements, private records of officers and by German material, to counter "garbled" accounts by the likes of Arthur Conan Doyle and John Buchan. Soundings with publishers and authors convinced Edmonds that a work based on dispatches would fail to engage the public. An educational work needed a foundation on which to base teaching, conclusions which were similar to those of Hankey; a work must be readable enough for the public to buy, be a credible educational work for the military student and rebut inaccurate commercial accounts by civilian authors.

== Prelude ==
=== Finance ===
The cost of producing the official history was raised in the House of Commons on 13 June 1922, during a proposal to farm out the work to private enterprise. Some MPs claimed to have heard nothing of the History.... in spite of five volumes having been published to a very good press. Daniel was called before H. A. L. Fisher, the President of the Board of Education and pointed out that working on the History.... would never pay a living wage and that for educational reasons the government must foot the bill, because of the exceptional value of the work. He calculated that the cost of the "History.... from 1916 to 1922 was about £42,000, the military histories costing £16,800 and the naval works £11,800, while the annual cost of producing Hansard was £44,000". Daniel also showed that the cost of the war from 3 August 1914 to 31 March 1920 was £11,196,927,000 or £3,500 per minute, a vast cost, against which the price of making the experience available for education was about four minutes of war expenditure per year for the Historical Section. The next meeting of the Historical Section subcommittee on 31 July 1922 endorsed the continuation of the project.

Finance remained the dominant influence on the production of the volumes, rather than literary or academic concerns about the work of the Historical Section. The subcommittee met six times in 1923 and on 9 August, Hankey managed to obtain a permanent Cabinet Subcommittee of Control of the Official Histories, chaired by the President of the Board of Education and meeting annually. There were twelve meetings between 1924 and 1946, with representatives from the Treasury, War Office, Admiralty, Air Ministry and the Secretary to the Committee of Imperial Defence. Daniel and Edmonds usually attended; other official historians and members of the Colonial and India offices were present for particular discussions; where the committee failed to agree, a ruling was made by the Cabinet. Edmonds submitted an annual report, other historians added summaries of their work, progress reports, staff and personnel matters and publications by foreign official historians. Meetings considered costs and the progress of publication, the number of volumes, their scope and size. On rare occasions the committee made a ruling on content, after complaints by a department; in 1928, the War Office strenuously objected to some of the content of the first Gallipoli volume by Cecil Aspinall-Oglander.

Money determined the speed of publication, the size and number of volumes and the choice of author, Edmonds preferring to employ officers on half-pay or retired on £500 per year, about half the price of a civilian author; officers were usually willing to work longer hours and do unpaid work. The Treasury managed to obtain the removal of Lieutenant-General Launcelot Kiggell, former Chief of the General Staff of the British Armies in France (late 1915 to early 1918) from 1918 Part I for reasons of cost. In 1923, it had been decided to prepare the volume out of sequence because of the importance of the failure of the German spring offensive (21 March – 18 July 1918) but by 1926, Kiggell had failed to prepare even a draft narrative for circulation to participants and thought that it would take him another four years to complete the work. At the Committee for Control meeting in January 1926, the Treasury recommended Kiggell's dismissal and Edmonds agreed, because his work was "lacking in colour and atmosphere".

=== Commerce ===
The price of the early volumes was set at 21 Shillings (21s) and another 21s for accompanying map cases but this was considered too costly for professional officers. In 1923, the price was cut to 12s 6d but this left no surplus for advertising and no incentive for booksellers to display them prominently; publishers also set a maximum number of pages per volume, a constraint that led the Committee for Control in 1924 to advise a price increase to 15s. In March 1933, Edmonds showed copies of French, German and Austrian histories to demonstrate their "elaborate and voluminous" nature. The comprehensive nature of the project was also determined by finance and proposals made by government departments from 1922 to 1939, for histories beyond the Western Front. In 1931, the War Office asked for a volume on the East African Campaign, because of lessons offered by a campaign in such a climate, at such a distance from Britain. The Treasury refused and suggested that the Colonial Office pay, as it had done for the West African volume. East Africa Part I was eventually published in 1941 with Colonial Office money. At the same meeting, the Foreign Office asked for a volume on the Blockade of Germany at their expense, because of the lessons that could be learned and its utility in conferences on international law; by being labelled Confidential it could be written frankly. (Note: The highest category of confidentiality was Secret, which limited circulation of material to individuals and army officers who had a need to know. Confidential writing could be seen by commissioned officers and some non-commissioned officers (NCOs) and For Official Use Only items could be seen but not bought, communicated to the press or persons not employed by the government.) Several volumes were financed by interested departments but Edmonds retained supervision and maintained the same editorial control as for the other volumes.

Parsimony affected the organisation of the Historical Section and the speed it could publish the History.... Premises, visits to battlefields and the number of historians and administrators were limited and in 1922, Edmonds threatened to resign if denied more help. Along with Daniel and Edmonds, the section had only three or four full-time officers, who had to write the volumes, prepare them for publication, maintain the library, study prisoner of war (POW) records and foreign official and non-official publications (in their native language) and provide help for the War Office, War Graves Commission, Staff College, educational establishments and government departments. The section had about 2,000 visitors a year to its cramped offices in Cavendish Square, until it moved to the Audit Office in 1922. By 1924, Edmonds had five administrators and eight writers, when the French and German equivalents had about 130 each; the British staff were also underpaid, Archibald Becke being refused a salary increase from £500 per annum. Edmonds got the money instead, from £560 to £800 per annum and then £1,000 per annum in 1924, when he was writing most of the histories, managing the section and working a seven-day-week for three months, then taking ten days off (Edmonds worked like this for much of the 29 years of the project). A 1927 proposal for Cyril Falls (2 March 1888 – 23 April 1971) to visit Mesopotamia for £200 was vetoed by the Treasury but £50 was allowed for Aspinall-Oglander to visit Gallipoli.

=== Official documents ===
The British Expeditionary Forces were the largest army the British state had raised and by 1924 it had generated more than 25 million documents; Edmonds thought they would take nine years to sort. When he took up his duties, Edmonds found the papers in heaps in the floor and apparently summarily sacked the Chief Clerk, for refusing to climb a ladder to retrieve a bundle. Edmonds complained that his predecessor, Christopher Atkinson, had let historians plunder the packets of documents and not return items, it had taken until June 1923 to catalogue the records. The first draft of a volume was prepared by a "narrator", who sorted, read and analysed the documents. The result was revised by the "historian" who added comments and a conclusion. The draft was then sent to participants down to battalion commanders, other senior military officers, politicians and government departments. The draft for 1916 Part I (including the First Day on the Somme) was sent to 1,000 officers, who, by 1931, had sent 1,470 replies. Comments on the first chapter created a pile 5 ft (1.5 m) high and Edmonds complained that his staff was insufficient, considering that he had briefed them that all names, initials, ranks and numbers had to be checked and then cross-checked with the French and German accounts; the small number of staff slowed production. In 1922, Edmonds had calculated that it would take twenty years to write ten volumes, a feat that the French had achieved in three years. It took 21 years (excluding 1939–1945) to produce 14 Western Front volumes and 15 more on other theatres.

=== Content ===
While finance determined the speed of the writing of volumes, Edmonds, as the Director, had the greater influence on the literary and academic integrity of the work. In the first volume, published in 1922, Edmonds wrote in the preface, that "no deviation from the truth nor misrepresentation will be found in the official histories on which my name appeared". Edmonds' claim has been challenged ever since, leading to a common assumption that the work is vapid at best and at worst fraudulent, a partial, misleading and exculpatory account of the military establishment. In 1934, Liddell Hart questioned the integrity of the writers, calling 1918 Part I "patriotic" and "parochial". Norman Brook, one of the official historians, claimed in 1945, that Edmonds could not be trusted to revise 1916 Part I, because he had succumbed to the temptation to interpolate his views. In 1976, John Keegan (15 May 1934 – 2 August 2012) wrote

...the compilers of the British Official History of the First World War have achieved the remarkable feat of writing an exhaustive account of one of the world's greatest tragedies without any display of emotion at all.

In 1985, David French wrote that Edmonds "...has a private purpose to conceal the truth about the high command in France from the lay public...." and that Edmonds had become concerned to rebut claims by politicians that Haig wasted lives on futile offensives; Edmonds' subjects were heroes and beyond criticism. Tim Travers wrote that Edmonds eschewed direct criticism of senior officers, was obliged to Haig and protected his reputation, rigged facts and drew false conclusions in the volumes on the Somme (1916 Part I), Passchendaele (1917 Part II) and 1918 Part I. In 1996, Paddy Griffith (4 February 1947 – 25 June 2010) called it an "...encyclopaedic work, transparently individualistic in tone, lucidly organised, wide in scope and by far the best book on the Western Front.". Griffith called the quantity of writing on the Great War "prodigious" and that despite Edmonds being unstable, insecure and having never held a field appointment, he was conscientious, intelligent and rarely allowed his devious and opinionated nature to distort his work on the official history.

Edmonds determined the presentation of information, which imposed constraints on the authors. All but implied criticism was to be avoided and the author was to resist the temptation to be "wise after the event". Disclosure of facts about opponents was to be kept to small-type footnotes or in notes at the end of chapters, because introducing facts not known at the time was hindsight, which was unfair and un-scholarly. A conclusion could be written for reflection and comment but not for fault-finding. For Edmonds, the constraints were necessary for some facts innocuously to be shown to the lay reader, yet be significant to experts reading between the lines. After Henry FitzMaurice Stacke, the first author of Military Operations: East Africa, Volume I died and Charles Hordern was appointed as replacement, Hordern wrote that Stacke had been frustrated by being obliged to

...gloss over (to put it mildly) mistakes and shortcomings to so great an extent as in my opinion to nullify the value of the work as history. Like him I have sedulously tried to avoid wounding any susceptibilities. But I have not shrunk from criticisms where they seemed necessary for the purpose either of impartial record or military study.... I have striven to say only enough to enable an intelligent reader to form his own judgement.

— (1938)

The avoidance of hindsight was consistent with the education Edmonds received at the Staff College on the teaching of Carl von Clausewitz (1 June 1780 – 16 November 1831), that the critic must only use the information available to a commander and his motives, rather than what the commander did not and could not know. Using knowledge after the event could show arrogance and a lack of critical judgement. In writing the first Gallipoli volume (1929), Cecil Aspinall-Oglander ignored the convention and on the draft copy, Edmonds called his account biased and lacking in the objective judgement necessary for an official historian. When Aspinall-Oglander refused to revise his text, Edmonds criticised him for

...lacking critical judgement, of arrogant sarcasm and of producing a valueless work which he would one day come to regret.

a complaint which had been occasionally levelled at Edmonds by the War Office and several participants in the war. Despite the constraints that Edmonds imposed on the form of the official histories, Andrew Green called his accounts accurate and comprehensive. Edmonds's correspondence with Basil Liddell Hart shows that Hart valued the official history and offered constructive criticism. Green wrote that when David French called the work "official but not history", he had used Hart's words out of context, Liddell Hart meaning that by leaving potentially controversial details to be read between the lines, Edmonds created the risk that later historians might use the phrase "official but not history", to describe the volumes.

== Publishing ==
=== Persia, 1914–1919 ===
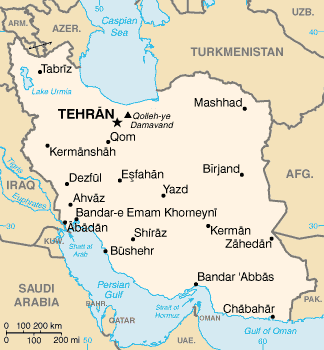
Map of Iran (Persia)

In October 1920, the Government of India provided money for a record of the Indian contribution to the world war and chose Brigadier-General F. J. Moberly (15 September 1867 – 6 April 1952) to write the official account of the Mesopotamian campaign (6 November 1914 – 14 November 1918). Moberly published four volumes from 1923 to 1927 and in 1926 the Government of India requested an additional volume on the Persian campaign (December 1914 – 30 October 1918). The work was nearly finished by September 1927, when the Government of India had doubts about publication on political grounds, because it would be dangerous to disclose intrigues with Iranian governments and individuals. The most helpful Iranian factions would come badly out of a volume that denigrated their assistance and "...the less we bring Afghanistan into the narrative the better for us". Sir Denys Bray of the Foreign and Political Department (Army Headquarters, India) supported the "excellent written" history but wanted it lodged in the Confidential records. Stephen Gaslee of the Foreign Office wrote to Daniel in October 1927, about his concern that the government of the Soviet Union (USSR) might publish information from the Russian Empire on Iran.

Gaslee felt that Soviet disclosures might put the British government at a disadvantage, if a censored version of British involvement in Iran had already been published; instead he preferred a comprehensive history kept Confidential. General George Kirkpatrick (Chief of the General Staff [India] from 1916 to 1920), took the view that discussion of the Seistan Strategy might upset Iranian sensibilities. Sir Percy Cox (20 November 1864 – 20 February 1937) who had been Chief Political Officer of Indian Expeditionary Force D, told Moberly that it was a fine piece of work, free from bias. Moberly wrote to Cox that avoiding controversy would render the volume valueless, making it impossible to justify British involvement in Iran to the public. Moberly referred to sensitivity over the "corrupt and self-interested attitude" of most Iranian politicians during the war and British fears of unrest in Afghanistan. Cox agreed that a bowdlerised account would be worthless and that Moberly should write without fear or favour, if necessary securing a commercial publisher. At a meeting of the Committee on Official Histories on 9 March 1928, the volume was limited For Official Use Only and since this would increase the cost of the volume, His Majesty's Stationery Office (HMSO) agreed to pay for it.

Moberly finished the work in May 1928, then in September, after the Foreign Office and the Government of India had approved the text, Lord Peel, Secretary of State for India, insisted that the politics of the military operations be removed and the last three chapters re-written, because even in a volume restricted For Official Use Only, the disclosure of secrets was most objectionable. Moberly wrote that if officers were to benefit from the experience of wartime events in Iran, the exceptional nature of political factors there and in neighbouring countries could not be ignored. Moberly wrote that he understood the need for care in writing the history and that the chapters had been vetted informally by the Foreign Office and approved by Cox, who as an expert in the field, was well qualified to balance secrecy with the needs of army students. At a meeting of the Committee on Official Histories on 26 March 1929, it was ruled that the volume would be marked Confidential in Britain and Secret in India. Edmonds had objected to the Confidential label, since it would be withheld from young officers but was over-ruled. A limited edition of 500 unexpurgated copies was printed by HMSO in late 1929, with 150 being marked Secret and sent to the Government of India. In March 1930, copies of the Confidential volume were supplied to the Imperial War Museum (IWM) library among others and in February 1933, HMSO destroyed the last 300 unbound copies; in 1987 the IWM published a facsimile copy of the volume at £24 net.

=== Rhineland, 1918–1929 ===
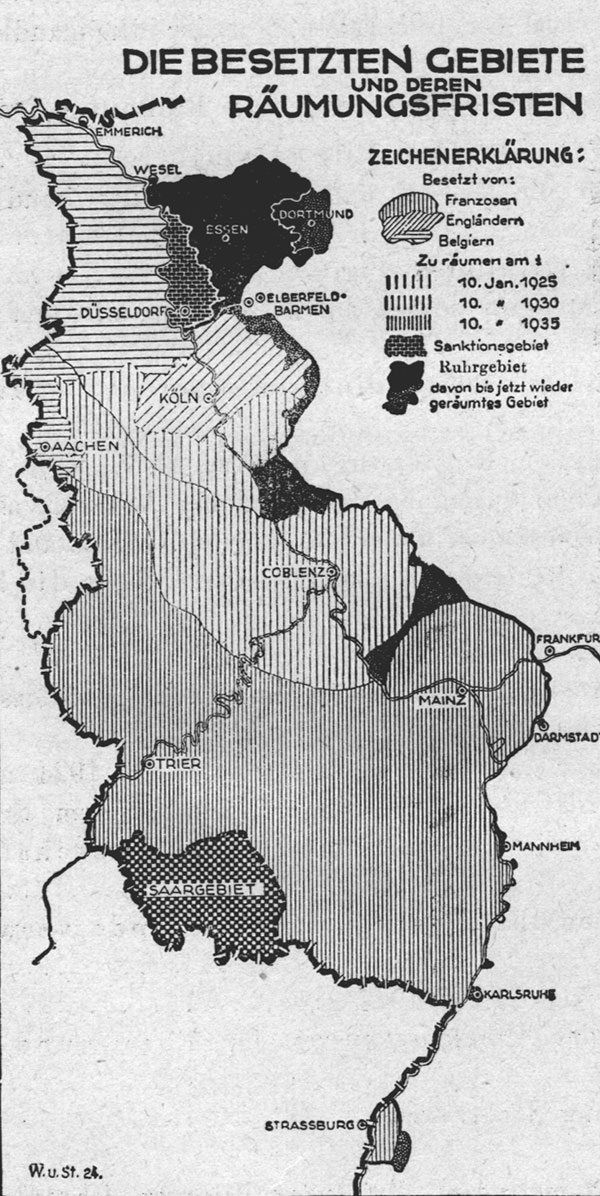
The occupation zones (Rhineland and Ruhr) 1919–1930. Dark dotted (Saar): League of Nations (France), vertically hatched: France, diagonally hatched: United Kingdom, horizontally hatched: Belgium, dark (Ruhr): France/Belgium

In 1930, Edmonds proposed a volume on the occupation in the Rhine Province by British Army on the Rhine (BAOR), to counter a recent German book but the Treasury refused to pay. Edmonds hoped that the War Office would find the money, began to collect information from former commanders and staffs of the BAOR and ensured the storage of BAOR records. By 1939, poor offices, lack of promotions and government parsimony, led him to complain that the official history, a national memorial, was being neglected. When Daniel retired in late 1939, Edmonds took on the duties of Secretary as well as Director and on 15 November, the Historical Section was evacuated to St. Anne's on Sea, Lancashire.

In April 1942 the section moved to the National Library of Wales at Aberystwyth. In February, the Committee for the Control of Official Histories decided to let Edmonds write the volume. R. A. Butler, President of the Board of Education, said that the volume would be useful as a historical background for the Armistice and disarmament terms to be imposed on Germany. In 1987, Bayliss wrote that utility was the main criterion but that it also kept Edmonds busy, having been passed over for the writing of the official histories of the Second World War. Edmonds was pleased because he saw it as the final volume of his Western Front campaign history.

Edmonds felt qualified to write the volume, having visited the Rhineland during the occupation, having gained specialist knowledge of the law of military government working with Professor L. F. L. Oppenheim (30 March 1858 – 7 October 1919) in 1912 on The Laws and Usages of War and being on good terms with many of the senior officers involved. Edmonds was hampered by a 1942 air raid, that burnt many of the records stored at Walworth in London. At Aberystwyth, Edmonds was isolated from metropolitan libraries and short of researchers. Requests for help from the Director of the Imperial War Museum had little effect, since his books had been moved to Barnstaple in Devon and because coverage of the occupation and inter-war period was sparse, owing to the usual lack of money. Edmonds was still able to glean plenty of details and gossip from senior officers in the occupation. General Charles Fergusson (17 January 1865 – 20 February 1951), a former military governor of Cologne, said that he disliked Field Marshal William Robertson (29 January 1860 – 12 February 1933) and that the enmity had led him to resign, despite being on good terms with General Herbert Plumer (13 March 1857 – 16 July 1932).

Major-General Archibald Montgomery-Massingberd, Chief of Staff of the BAOR, criticised Robertson for being too fussy, Fergusson for pro-German sympathies and told Plumer that Fergusson was too much of a gentleman for the job. Plumer had asked if it were possible to be too much of a gentleman and Massingberd reminisced that he had said,

...yes you can when fighting against animals like the Boche and the Japs.... You have to fight him as if he was a man eating Tiger or hunting Bull Elephant.

— Massingberd

Due to the hostilities, Edmonds was unable to correspond and exchange material with German researchers and was allowed only a galley proof and one page proof. In October 1943, Edmonds complained that speed and economy mattered more than respect for military history. Edmonds hoped that the volume would have educational use, in the event that Britain would again occupy foreign lands and that

...the quick change of the German attitude from one of humble subservience to pre-war arrogance, and the call for the strictest economy regardless of the military situation may be said to be the keynotes of the story of the occupation.

— Edmonds

Edmonds struggled to produce an impartial history of the occupation and draft copies sent to the War Office and Foreign Office led Brigadier W. L. van Cutsen for the War Office to complain that the volume should have been more broadly written and that administrative and other details were overly detailed but he found the chapter on the operations of the British Upper Silesia Force helpful. Far worse criticism came from the Foreign Office on 3 January 1944, the text being called often misleading and incomplete, without the inclusion of much controversial material. It was suggested that the value of the volume would be enhanced by the reduction of political references to mere facts and dates. Examples included a desire to describe the murder of Kurt von Schleicher (7 April 1882 – 30 June 1934) "in the purge of 30 June 1934" rather than "by Hitler" in Edmonds' draft. Unemployment pay should never be referred to as a "dole" as this implied that British men had enlisted in the pre-1914 army to avoid starvation and Lloyd George (17 January 1863 – 26 March 1945) might resent being portrayed as "less well-disposed" to Germany, than Bonar Law (16 September 1858 – 30 October 1923). More examples were quoted and ended on Edmonds' description of the Locarno Treaties (5–16 October 1925) with "...it is most improper for an official historian to describe a treaty concluded by His Majesty's Government as 'verbiage'".

Edmonds retorted that he would ignore the criticisms as they were "trifling or silly", except for a request to cut a comment that Viscount D'Abernon, Ambassador to Germany (1920–1925) was pro-German. Edmonds pointed out that the views were his, not officially endorsed and that the official history should not be determined by the War Office, Admiralty or Foreign Office. The volume had been based on official documents and he stood by it. The source of the criticism was Charles Webster (25 July 1886 – August 1961), who had written memoranda analysing the Armistice and military occupation, ready for the anticipated re-occupation of Germany. Edmonds was most critical of one of the documents and wrote to Webster defending Haig. Obstacles were placed between him and his detractors, with the intention of protecting his feelings, because the Foreign Office harboured another critic, Llewellyn Woodward (1890–1971), who called the book episodic, with slurred chronology and a narrative of the controversy over provisioning the occupied territories that was misleading; criticism of civilian authorities lacked evidence and was "dogmatic and prejudiced". Woodward, less critical than Webster, asked him to spare Edmonds' feelings but Webster found the book lacking in analytical rigour, refused to devote more time to it and R. A. Butler, Chairman of the Committee on the Control of Official Histories, got the job of rejecting the book for publication. In July 1944, over Edmonds' objections, it was decided to print a hundred copies For Official Use Only but only after many Foreign Office demands had been conceded, including cuts to the preface.

Work on the volume had begun in 1930, resumed in September 1942 and was completed in draft in July 1943. Ready to print in May 1944, the order came on 31 July for a limited edition by HMSO, because the small print run made it impossible for Macmillan to realise a profit. Edmonds later tried to have the small issue made public but in November 1947, HMSO was ordered to destroy the type of the book. (The volume remained unseen, until the Fifty-year Rule was amended to the Thirty-year rule in 1967, allowing the public to view the surviving copies.) The failings of the volume raised questions as to the suitability of Edmonds continuing as Director of the Historical Section for the rest of the series but given that it was beyond his normal area of expertise, he was allowed to carry on and produced a short account of the Occupation of Constantinople, saw the remaining volumes on the Western Front through to publication and retired in July 1949, just before the publication of the final volume Military Operations: Italy, 1915–1919 (1949), ended thirty years' work. Edmonds was somewhat chagrined when the War Office ordered 800 copies of Assize of Arms (1946) by Brigadier-General John Morgan (20 March 1876 – 8 April 1955), that he called far more outspoken on the occupation. (Note: Edmonds was also affronted at the publicity for The British War Economy (1949) by Keith Hancock and Margaret Gowing, compared to the penny-pinching over the History of the Great War.)

=== France and Belgium 1917 Part II ===
==== James Edmonds ====
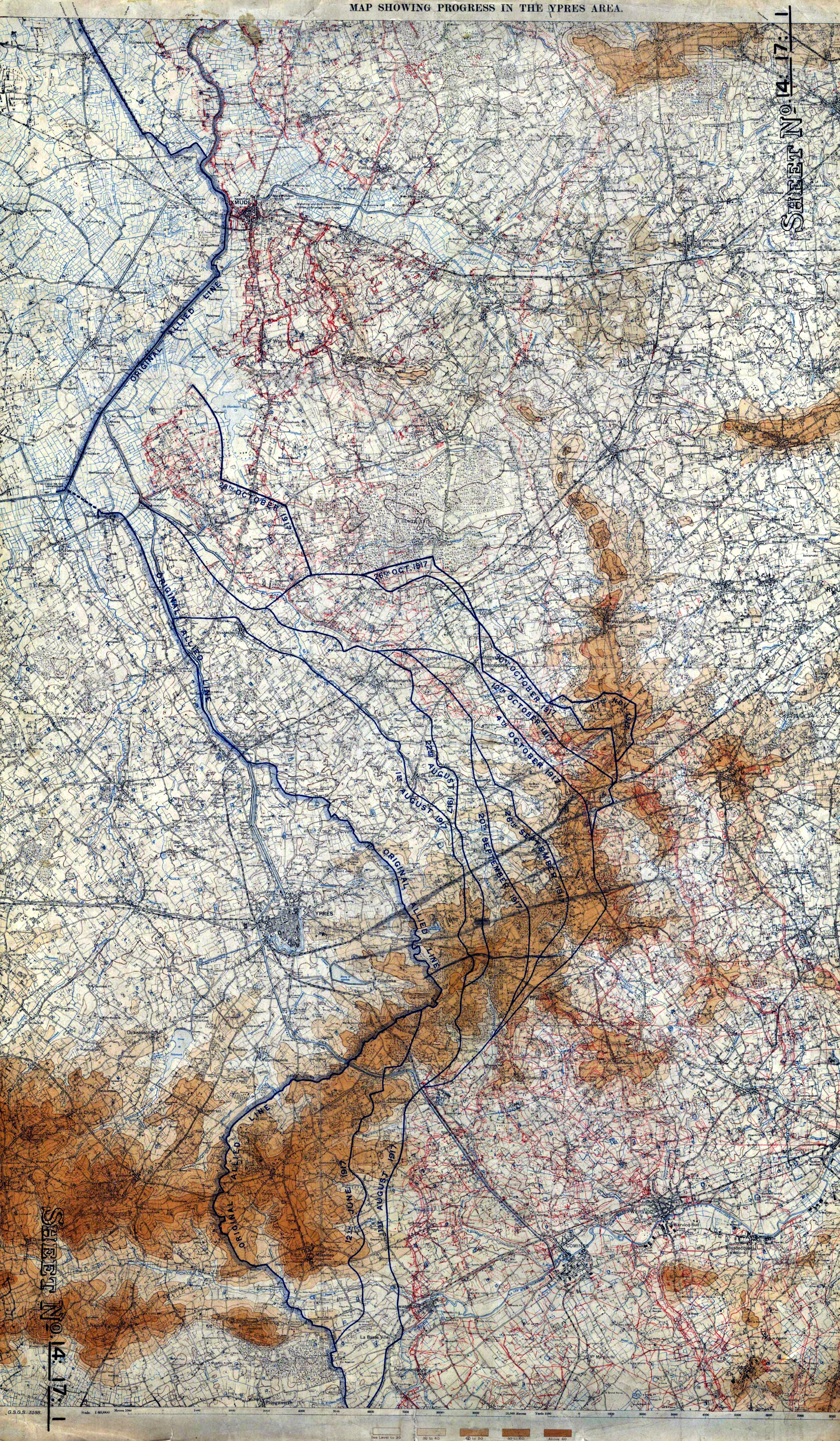
Map showing advances on the Ypres front, 31 July –10 November 1917.

In the second volume of Military Operations France and Belgium, 1917 (1917 Part II) Edmonds, wrote that Haig and General Hubert Gough (12 August 1870 – 18 March 1963) the Fifth Army commander (30 October 1916 – 27 March 1918), were at cross purposes before and during the early part of the Third Battle of Ypres (31 July – 10 November 1917). Edmonds described meetings between Gough and his corps commanders on 6 and 16 June, at which deeper objectives than those of the GHQ 1917 plan were decided on and that an extra objective was added, to be attempted at the discretion of divisional commanders and only against weak opposition. This fourth objective (red line) was beyond the range of most of the Fifth Army field artillery and all heavy artillery was to be on call to put a defensive barrage beyond advanced posts along it.

Brigadier-General John Davidson, head of the Operations Branch at General Headquarters, questioned the Fifth Army plan in a memorandum of 26 June, recommending that the objectives be less ambitious and that the provision for an advance of 5,000 yd (2.8 mi; 4.6 km) to the red line be abandoned. A Fifth Army order of 27 June summarised the conclusions of a meeting by Gough and the corps commanders the previous day and laid down the green line as the main objective, an advance of 1,000 yd (910 m) in the south, 3,500 yd (2.0 mi; 3.2 km) in the centre and 2,500 yd (1.4 mi; 2.3 km) in the north, at the junction with the French First Army (General François Anthoine). Patrols were to be sent forward to probe the German defences and occupy vacant ground but it was more important to avoid a ragged front line. In reply to Davidson, Gough wrote that the green line should be attempted and that opportunities to take ground up to the red line "without much opposition", should be taken.

On 28 June, Haig discussed the Davidson memo at a meeting with Gough and General Herbert Plumer, the commander of the Second Army on the right flank of the Fifth Army and emphasised the importance of the Gheluvelt plateau. Edmonds wrote that the Fifth Army plan did not conform to Haig's requirement that the main battle would be fought for the plateau. Gough had spread the Fifth Army divisions evenly along the front, when he could have increased the size of II Corps (Lieutenant-General Claud Jacob), opposite the plateau. In a footnote, Edmonds described Fifth Army intelligence summaries in July, that stressed the strength of the German defences on the plateau, that the Germans were building more defences there than on the rest of the front and that the assembly areas of the German Eingreifdivisionen (specialist counter-attack divisions) were behind the plateau and the Broodseinde–Passchendaele ridge. The summaries predicted that the Germans would try to hold the plateau, even if driven back across the Steenbeek further north.

The description of the apparent misunderstanding between Haig and Gough is contradicted by an account on the following pages of a visit made on 27 June by Haig to the headquarters of II Corps. (Note: In 2024, Nicholas Ridley wrote that Haig could not have visited Jacob on 27 July as he was in London.) Jacob asked that his southern flank be extended to allow an attack on the Bassevillebeek Spur beyond the Bassevillebeek Stream, to deny the German army a jumping-off place for counter-attacks against the right flank of the corps from Tower Hamlets, a cluster of pill-boxes at the top of the spur. Haig emphasised to Jacob the importance of the capture of the plateau and arranged with the Fifth Army headquarters "at once", for II Corps to take command of the 24th Division (Major-General Major-General Louis Bols) to the south, the northernmost division of the Second Army. The Fifth Army–Second Army boundary was moved south on 4 July, to the Klein Zillebeke–Zandvoorde road. In a footnote Edmonds described the transfer of the artillery of the 23rd Division (Major-General James Babington), the 24th Division artillery, thirteen medium (60-pounder gun), 25 heavy (fifteen 6-inch gun, five 8-inch and five 9.2-inch howitzer) batteries from the Second Army to II Corps.

Edmonds wrote that the Fifth Army had 226 heavy and medium guns, 526 heavy and medium howitzers, 1,098 field guns and 324 field howitzers, a total of 2,174 artillery pieces or 2,299 pieces "on the Fifth Army front". In footnotes, Edmonds added that II Corps had an "extra division", three heavy counter-battery and three heavy bombardment double groups; (a single group had 4–6 siege, heavy or medium batteries) while each of the three British corps to the north had two heavy counter-battery double groups and three heavy bombardment groups. The II Corps divisions had eight or nine field artillery brigades each, rather than the six in the divisions of the other corps. (Note: In The 18th Division in the Great War (1922), G. H. F. Nichols included an anecdote that II Corps had 1,000 guns and that each division in II Corps had twelve brigades of field artillery.) II Corps had (43 per cent) of the Fifth Army artillery and had five divisions, 3 1/3 attacking on 31 July, compared to four divisions with two attacking, in each of the other corps. The green line for II Corps varied, from a depth of 1,000 yd (910 m) on the southern flank at Klein Zillibeke, to 2,500 yd (2,300 m) on the northern flank, along the Ypres–Roulers railway; the green line from the southern flank of XIX Corps to the northern flank of XIV Corps required an advance of 3,500–2,500 yd (2.0–1.4 mi; 3.2–2.3 km). An advance of 5,000 yd (4,600 m) to the red line was not fundamental to the plan and discretion to attempt it was left with the divisional commanders, based on the extent of local German resistance, a provision which conformed to the manual SS 135. Had the German defence collapsed and the red line been reached, the German Flandern I, II and III lines would still have been east of the new front line, except for 1 mi (1.6 km) of Flandern I south of Broodseinde. (Note: In the Capture of Westhoek on 10 August, II Corps was required to reach the black line of 31 July, an advance of 400–900 yd (370–820 m) and at the Battle of Langemarck (16–18 August), the Fifth Army was to advance 1,500 yd (1,400 m).)

==== Tim Travers ====
In The Killing Ground.... (1987), Tim Travers wrote that on the planning and conduct of the Battle of Pilckem Ridge (31 July – 2 August) and the Battle of Langemarck described in 1917 Part II, the volume reflected three controversies. Travers wrote that Gough believed that Haig had ordered him to plan a breakthrough offensive, particularly at the meeting on 28 June, yet a few days later, Haig changed his mind and wanted a step-by-step attack. Travers wrote that it was illogical to give the principal command of a bite and hold attack to a "thruster" like Gough, when Plumer had a reputation for thoroughness. Travers wrote that Haig wavered in his thinking about what he wanted but left Gough under the impression that he was to plan a breakthrough attack.

Travers wrote that Haig had emphasised the importance of the Gheluvelt plateau, particularly at the meeting of 28 June and that on 30 June, Haig wrote, "Capture the Passchendaele–Staden Ridge", on his copy of the Fifth Army plan. The importance of the Gheluvelt plateau is also found in GHQ orders of 5 July and Fifth Army orders on 8 July. Travers wrote that the Fifth Army failed to give adequate emphasis to this and that a structural obstacle constrained the army, since the southern edge of the Gheluvelt plateau was inside the Second Army boundary. Travers concluded that Haig and GHQ chose the time, place and strategy of the campaign and that Gough and the Fifth Army staff decided the tactics. Travers called Wynne's first draft of 1917 Part II (1943) as "anti-Haig", the second draft (1944) as "anti-Gough" and the third draft (1945) as "anti-Haig and anti-Gough". Edmonds's fourth draft (published 1948) was "pro-Haig and anti-Gough" and Wynne declined to be named as an author. Travers wrote that Edmonds was willing to accept criticism and made amendments for interested parties, to whom drafts were circulated but became increasingly protective of Haig's reputation and noticeably autocratic towards the other historians.

Travers described a leadership vacuum in the BEF caused by delegation, that was "scandalous" and that Edmonds failed to stress this. Gough had attempted a breakthrough offensive, conforming to the decisions laid down by Haig, was at fault for overlooking the importance of the Gheluvelt plateau and for ignoring a suggestion by the XIV Corps commander (Lieutenant-General Rudolph Cavan), to add weight to the attack there. Travers wrote that 1917 Part II omitted a request made by Gough in August for a conference, to discuss a remedy for the lack of weight being brought against the Gheluvelt plateau, a matter that Haig and the staff at GHQ should have settled long before the attack commenced, along with the awkward placement of the Second Army-Fifth Army boundary. In the published version of 1917 Part II, most of the blame for the decisions on the type of offensive, the width and direction of attacks and responsibility for planning was put on Gough and the Fifth Army staff, rather than on Haig and GHQ for selecting the Ypres Salient at all.

==== Andrew Green ====
In 2003, Green described the writing of 1917 Part II by Wynne and the circulation of the first draft to participants. Gough found the first draft highly objectionable and since so many other participants in the battle had died, his views were given considerable attention by Edmonds, during Wynne's absence on war work in 1943. Gough held that the draft exaggerated his intention to break through the German defences at Ypres. Gough described the meeting of 28 June 1917 by Haig, Gough and Plumer, as evidence of Haig's understanding and acceptance of the Fifth Army plan. Gough noted that General Headquarters had caused a road to be built and kept clear for the use of cavalry and that Haig had rejected Rawlinson's and Plumer's plans as too limited. Gough stressed that his plan was not limited by specific objectives, which had hampered attacks at Loos and Gallipoli in 1915 and the Somme in 1916. Wynne had referred to the Davidson memo of 26 June but Gough pointed out that reserves were available close by, to exploit advantages that emerged, rather than the first attacking troops were to advance indefinitely.

Green wrote that Edmonds told Wynne to include the points made by Gough but that Wynne objected, because Davidson had related how Haig revised his views after a 25 June meeting with the Cabinet in London and wrote "wear down the enemy but have an objective" on the Fifth Army plan. Wynne claimed that Gough had misunderstood Haig's intentions and that was the source of Gough's objections to the draft; Edmonds supported Wynne but later changed his mind. Green wrote that Haig had intended Gough to conduct a breakthrough attempt and that Edmonds had included this in the draft, as well as describing the changes in Haig's outlook during 1917, as the prospect of significant French support varied. Gough had added the red line to meet Haig's requirements but overlooked the importance of the Gheluvelt plateau, spreading his forces equally across the attack front. Green noted that Prior and Wilson had found this in their 1998 study and that in 2001 Simpson noted Prior and Wilson's emphasis on artillery and lack of analysis of infantry operations. Green also wrote that Edmonds referred to the continuity of Haig's optimism about the possibility of a deep advance on 4 August, 21 September and in early October, long after the likelihood had ended.

Edmonds changed the draft in Gough's favour, by showing that the weather in August was unusually wet, with extracts from a French study Le Climat de La France (Guillaume Bigourdan) that contradicted the 1929 book by Haig's Chief Intelligence Officer Brigadier-General John Charteris (1915–1918). Edmonds wrote that the worst of the weather occurred from 12 October to 10 November, yet vividly described the wet and muddy conditions in August and their morale-sapping effect on British troops. Wynne had written extensively on the difficulties of the French Army after the Nivelle Offensive and its effect on British strategy but Edmonds cut much of this. Edmonds left much of the remainder of Wynne's draft, despite Gough's objection that it implied that Haig had abrogated his authority by delegating so much to Gough and not imposing changes, to allay his doubts about the Fifth Army plan for the Gheluvelt plateau. Edmonds noted the persistence with which Haig pursued objectives and that he advocated attacks regardless of their geographical progress, to keep pressure on the German army.

Green related an estrangement between Wynne and Edmonds, over Edmonds' willingness to accept Gough's objections. Edmonds sent Wynne to meet Gough, which led to a substantial change in Wynne's point of view. Wynne revised the draft to remove much of the blame from Gough, writing that Haig bore principal responsibility for the Fifth Army plan in the third (1945) draft. Edmonds then found this draft objectionable and quarrelled with Wynne, who declined to be named as an author. Green wrote that Edmonds and Wynne had changed their views about Gough and made the narrative of his role in the events of 1917 much more accurate, it being noticeably less defensive of Haig. Wynne's conclusion had been that the strategy of retaining the initiative to protect the French Army had worked and that the tactical intention to clear the Belgian coast had failed, due to an underestimation of German resilience and the mistaken attempt at a breakthrough.

Earlier plans had been for short advances and an emphasis on the Gheluvelt plateau. Haig was responsible for accepting Gough's plan for 31 July, despite his cautious reminder to Gough on 6 July, giving the Passchendaele–Staden Ridge and the Belgian coast as geographical objectives. Wynne removed these details from his draft but concluded that the GHQ 1917 plan might have been as successful as the Battle of Messines (7–14 June). Edmonds had also accepted the logic of an offensive in Flanders but not that of appointing Gough; if Haig had wanted a cautious attack he was wrong to have relegated Plumer. Green showed that Edmonds acknowledged the constraints affecting Haig but that he had wanted a breakthrough attack, chose Gough who known as a "thruster" and encouraged his optimism; Haig had kept any misgivings to himself.

Green referred to Tim Travers and wrote that he had taken the same view as Edmonds, on the questions of the intended breakthrough and the importance of the Gheluvelt plateau. Edmonds had written that Haig had accepted Gough's wishes and Green wrote that this did not mean that Gough was aware of Haig's doubts. Edmonds thought that Haig wanted a decisive success and the capture of distant objectives on the first day, despite doubts that he kept to himself. Travers had written that the Edmonds draft was wrong, yet had formed the same conclusions as Edmonds. Travers had criticised the published draft for failing to record that Haig had not resolved disagreements and problems among his subordinates, long before the offensive began; Green wrote that Edmonds had made the same criticism. Green wrote that judging the drafts of the volume "pro-" or "anti-" Haig or Gough was facile and led to inconsistent conclusions. If the published draft was "anti-" Gough that it was surprising that he had called it a great improvement.

Green compared the volume with later studies and wrote that the narrative did not support an explanation of the delay from 7 June to 31 July, being caused by a need to divert the Germans from the French Army. On 7 May, Haig had decided to begin the Messines operation in early June but he had not been informed until 2 June of the state of French Army. Edmonds had written that the attack on Messines Ridge began on 7 June because of the difficulty of mounting three simultaneous attacks at Ypres. Edmonds ascribed the apparent delay from 7 June to 31 July, to Haig's decision to give principal responsibility to Gough. Wynne had claimed that Edmonds failed to reveal the superiority of German tactics but in 1998, Prior and Wilson had shown that British tactics had evolved in 1917, although their application was inconsistent. Edmonds had demonstrated that the attack on Messines ridge was a cautious advance for 1–2 mi (1.6–3.2 km). The plan incorporated progressive elements like those used at Arras on 9 April, particularly its emphases on counter-battery fire and a carefully controlled creeping barrage.

The Second Army had 2,266 guns and howitzers, that fired 144,000 long tons (146,000 t) of ammunition, 2 1/2 times more than that available for the First Day on the Somme (1 July 1916), to counter the deep German defence zones and Eingreifdivisionen. Strongpoints were destroyed, wire was cut and German artillery suppressed. Three layers of creeping barrage 700 yd (640 m) deep preceded the infantry, who had been trained in the pillbox fighting methods used at Vimy Ridge. The infantry were followed by mopping-up parties, who captured by-passed German positions. Use of such techniques had been possible because the artillery had become more accurate. The gunners also had more ammunition to use and had been able to suppress German defences as the British advanced; objectives had been limited to the range of the artillery and had led to a great victory. Prior and Wilson wrote that these methods were not used on 31 July, because Haig had over-ruled Rawlinson, Plumer and Davidson; Gough over-reached and left the British infantry vulnerable to German counter-attacks. Edmonds had written that on 31 July, excessive demands had been placed on the artillery that spread its fire too thin.

Green wrote that at the end of August, Haig had turned to Plumer and bite-and-hold tactics and that Edmonds called this a radical revision. The greatest weight of artillery-fire possible was to be massed against the Gheluvelt plateau, for a succession of strictly limited attacks. Plumer planned four steps at six-day intervals, to give time to move artillery and supplies forward. The steps were limited to a depth of 1,500 yd (1,400 m) and a large increase in medium and heavy artillery was to be used to smash pillboxes and to add to the counter-battery effort. The Battle of the Menin Road Ridge (20–26 September) had double the number of guns on half the depth of attack, making four times the weight of shell compared to 31 July. Infantry tactics also emphasised systematic consolidation of captured ground and strongpoints. With the new battle drill and unprecedented artillery support, the attack was a great success. Green noted that Prior and Wilson described the battle as a triumph of reduced expectations and that Passchendaele Ridge was still 4,500 yd (2.6 mi; 4.1 km) away. Haig had then insisted on preparations for a breakthrough after the successes of the Battle of Polygon Wood (26–27 September) and the Battle of Broodseinde (4 October) but inadequate artillery preparation led to the failures at the Battle of Poelcappelle (9 October) and the First Battle of Passchendaele (12 October).

Green concluded that the publication of 1917 Part II in 1948 had much to awaken controversy, particularly the contrast between flawed tactics and the methods used with success earlier in 1917. Green wrote that the volume mostly accorded with modern writing and contained little bias regarding Haig. Edmonds had referred to the external constraints of lack of manpower and the state of the French Army, yet his narrative had made the military errors manifest; Haig's desire for a breakthrough had led to a failure to relate strategy to tactics. Haig had failed to communicate with Plumer and Gough and had prolonged the offensive into the period of bad weather in early October. Green concluded that Edmonds had produced a work of lasting authority, in a series of substantial historical, military and literary value. Green wrote that later scholars who have accused Edmonds of bias, have had to acknowledge that his assessments and conclusions are largely accurate.

== History of the Great War ==
=== Chronology ===
- Skinner, H.; Stacke, H. FitzM. (1922). Principal Events, 1914–1918. History of the Great War Based on Official Documents by Direction of the Committee of Imperial Defence. London: HMSO. OCLC 3043585.

=== Military Operations ===
Titles are on the front of dust jackets and on title pages, usually History of the Great War based on Official Documents by Direction of the Committee of Imperial Defence, followed by the place and a description of the contents of the volume. On the spine Military Operations is used, followed by the location, year and asterisks showing the part number, e.g. France and Belgium 1917 *. Edmonds wrote most of Military Operations: France and Belgium and Cecil Aspinall-Oglander, Archibald Becke (maps), Cyril Falls, Charles Hordern, George Macmunn, Wilfrid Miles, Henry Stacke and Graeme Wynne wrote most of the volumes beyond the Western Front, edited by Edmonds. Frederick Moberly was appointed by the Indian Army Historical Office as author of The Campaign in Mesopotamia 1914–1918 and Operations in Persia 1914–1919 in which the Indian Army played a large part.

[Author initials only, after first use]

==== East Africa ====
- Hordern, Lieutenant-Colonel Charles; Stacke, Captain Henry FitzMaurice (1941). Military Operations: East Africa, August 1914 – September 1916. History of the Great War based on Official Documents by Direction of the Committee of Imperial Defence. Vol. I. Founded on a draft by the late Major H. FitzM. Stacke, M.C., P.S.C. The Worcestershire Regiment (1st ed.). London: HMSO. OCLC 494897172.
  - One volume envisaged but Stacke died in 1935, when the draft was being circulated for review. Hordern revised work into two volumes, completed volume I then also died. Volume I republished Imperial War Museum Department of Printed Books and the Battery Press (IWM-BP) in 1992, b/w maps, no dust jacket (ndj). Volume II unfinished, chapters XII to XIX by Stacke covering events from 1916 to 1918 remain in the National Archives.

==== Egypt and Palestine ====
- Macmunn, George Fletcher; Falls, Cyril Bentham (1928). Military Operations: Egypt and Palestine, From the Outbreak of War with Germany to June 1917. History of the Great War based on Official Documents by Direction of the Committee of Imperial Defence. Vol. I. accompanying Map Case (1st ed.). London: HMSO. OCLC 505377264.
  - Operations of the Egyptian Expeditionary Force (EEF) and the start of the Arab Revolt, the captures of Mecca, Wejh and Aquaba, revolt chapters drafted by T. E. Lawrence; republished Imperial War Museum Department of Printed Books and the Battery Press (IWM-BP) 1996, ndj.
- Macmunn, G. F.; Falls, C. (1930). Military Operations: Egypt and Palestine, From June 1917 to the End of the War Part I. History of the Great War based on Official Documents by Direction of the Committee of Imperial Defence. Vol. II. accompanying Map Case (1st ed.). London: HMSO. OCLC 6823528.
  - Republished IWM-BP 1996, ndj.
- Macmunn, G. F.; Falls, C. (1930). Military Operations: Egypt and Palestine, From June 1917 to the End of the War Part II. History of the Great War based on Official Documents by Direction of the Committee of Imperial Defence. Vol. II. accompanying Map Case (1st ed.). London: HMSO. OCLC 656066774.
  - EEF advance through Palestine and Jordan, Megiddo, capture of Jerusalem and Damascus. Continuation of Arab Revolt and advance from Arabia to join EEF, guerrilla attacks on Hejaz railway, capture of Medina; republished IWM-BP 1996, ndj.

==== France and Belgium, 1914 ====
- Edmonds, Brigadier-General Sir James Edward (1922). Military Operations: France and Belgium: Mons, the Retreat to the Seine, the Marne and the Aisne, August – October 1914. History of the Great War based on Official Documents by Direction of the Committee of Imperial Defence. Vol. I. accompanying Map Case (1st ed.). London: Macmillan. OCLC 459296806.
  - Two addenda and corrigenda sheets issued with 1914 II and 1915 I; reprinted 1925 as second edition, revised and republished edition 1933, incorporating new information from French and German official and British, French and German regimental histories, more narrative of RFC operations not covered in The War in the Air. No other volume corrected and republished, errata notified in later volumes. Addenda and corrigenda for 3rd edition issued with 1918 II; 2nd and 3rd editions issued in brown dust jacket. Shearer Publications republished 3rd edition, 1984 without accompanying Map Case. Imperial War Museum Department of Printed Books and Battery Press (IWM-BP) republished 3rd edition, 1996, b/w maps, ndj. Imperial War Museum Department of Printed Books and Naval and Military Press (IWM-NMP) republished 3rd edition pbk, 2009, colour maps, large maps on CD-ROM.
- Edmonds, J. E. (1925). Military Operations: France and Belgium: Antwerp, La Bassée, Armentières, Messines and Ypres, October – November 1914. History of the Great War based on Official Documents by Direction of the Committee of Imperial Defence. Vol. II. accompanying Map Case (2nd ed.). London: Macmillan. OCLC 459296807.
  - Summary of army expansion, digression on attacks on German colonies; addenda and corrigenda issued with 1915 I, 1915 II, 1916 I, 1916 II, 1918 I and 1918 III. Republished IWM-BP 1995, IWM-NMP, pbk. Colour maps 2009.

==== France and Belgium, 1915 ====
- Edmonds, J. E.; Wynne, Graeme Chamley (1927). Military Operations: France and Belgium: Winter 1914–15: Battle of Neuve Chapelle: Battles of Ypres. History of the Great War based on Official Documents by Direction of the Committee of Imperial Defence. Vol. I. accompanying Map Case (1st ed.). London: Macmillan. OCLC 459168716.
  - Addenda and corrigenda issued with 1915 II, 1916 I, 1918 I, 1918 II and Italy; republished IWP-BP 1992, IWM-NMP pbk. Colour maps 2009.
- Edmonds, J. E. (1928). Military Operations: France and Belgium: Battles of Aubers Ridge, Festubert, and Loos. History of the Great War based on Official Documents by Direction of the Committee of Imperial Defence. Vol. II. accompanying Map Case (1st ed.). London: Macmillan. OCLC 769476977.
  - Addenda and corrigenda issued with 1916 I, 1916 II and 1918 III; republished IWM-BP 1995, IWM-NMP pbk. Colour maps 2009.

==== France and Belgium, 1916 ====
- Edmonds, J. E. (1932). Military Operations: France and Belgium, Sir Douglas Haig's Command to the 1st July: Battle of the Somme. History of the Great War based on Official Documents by Direction of the Committee of Imperial Defence. Vol. I. accompanying Appendices and Map Case (A. F. Becke) volume (1st ed.). London: Macmillan. OCLC 689489.
  - Addenda and corrigenda sheet with 1918 I, the preparations for and First day on the Somme. Republished IWM-BP b/w maps 1993, IWM-NMP pbk, colour maps, 2009.
- Miles, Wilfrid (1938). Military Operations: France and Belgium, 2 July 1916 to the End of the Battles of the Somme. History of the Great War based on Official Documents by Direction of the Committee of Imperial Defence. Vol. II. accompanying Appendices and Map Case (A. F. Becke) volume (1st ed.). London: Macmillan. OCLC 174835218.
  - Addenda and corrigenda sheets, with 1917 I, 1918 III; republished Shearer 1986 (no Map Case), IWM-BP b/w maps 1992, Map Case 1994, IWM-NMP pbk. Colour maps 2009.

==== France and Belgium, 1917 ====
- Falls, C. B. (1940). Military Operations: France and Belgium, The German Retreat to the Hindenburg Line and the Battles of Arras. History of the Great War based on Official Documents by Direction of the Committee of Imperial Defence. Vol. I. accompanying Appendices volume (1940) and Map Case (A. F. Becke 1932) (1st ed.). London: Macmillan. OCLC 222075288.

Addenda and Corrigenda sheet with Italy 1915–1919. Republished IWM-BP b/w maps 1992 Map Case 1994, IWM-NMP colour maps 2009.

- Edmonds, J. E.; Falls, C. B.; Wynne, G. C. (1948). Military Operations: France and Belgium, 7th June – 10th November: Messines and Third Ypres (Passchendaele). History of the Great War based on Official Documents by Direction of the Committee of Imperial Defence. Vol. II (1st ed.). London: HMSO. OCLC 769477027.

Addenda and corrigenda sheet issued with Italy 1915–1919, Falls was commissioned for the volume 1939 but resigned to take job with The Times and was replaced by Wynne. The draft chapters received strenuous objections from General Sir Hubert Gough over blame for failures, noting that GHQ had planned much of the offensive and were also culpable. Wynne rewrote certain passages, adding some comments from Gough; Edmonds, Wynne and Gough corresponded during the writing which Wynne finished in 1946. Edmonds rewrote parts in 1948, correcting in a fourth draft what he judged to be errors by Wynne, who declined to be named as author of the work. For economy, there was no map case; large maps were supplied in a folder on the back cover. It was republished IWM-BP b/w maps 1991, IWM-NMP pbk. Colour maps 2009.

- Miles, W. (1948). Military Operations: France and Belgium, The Battle of Cambrai. History of the Great War based on Official Documents by Direction of the Committee of Imperial Defence. Vol. III (1st ed.). London: HMSO. OCLC 494894803.

Addenda and corrigenda sheet with Italy 1915–1919; republished IWM-BP b/w maps 1991, IWM-NMP pbk Colour maps 2009

==== France and Belgium, 1918 ====
- Edmonds, J. E.; Kiggell, Launcelot Edward (1935). Military Operations: France and Belgium, The German March Offensive and its Preliminaries. History of the Great War based on Official Documents by Direction of the Committee of Imperial Defence. Vol. I. accompanying Appendices volume and Map Case (A. F. Becke) (1st ed.). London: Macmillan. OCLC 875000806.
  - Written out of chronological order; due to speed of German advance, British record keeping broke down, making sources unreliable. Kiggell, BEF chief of staff 1915–1918, commissioned in 1924 to interview participants, to compensate for lack of records; sacked for dilatory progress and "colourless" prose, 1926. Completed by Edmonds after finishing 1916 I; republished IWM-BP b/w maps 1995, IWM-NMP pbk. Colour maps 2009.
- Edmonds, J. E. (1937). Military Operations: France and Belgium, March–April: Continuation of the German Offensives. History of the Great War based on Official Documents by Direction of the Committee of Imperial Defence. Vol. II. accompanying Map Case (A. F. Becke) (1st ed.). London: Macmillan. OCLC 219851479.
  - Addenda and corrigenda sheets with 1917 I and 1918 III; republished IWM-BP b/w maps 1995, IWM-NMP pbk Colour maps 2009
- Edmonds, J. E. (1939). Military Operations: France and Belgium, May–July: The German Diversion Offensives and the First Allied Counter-Offensive. History of the Great War based on Official Documents by Direction of the Committee of Imperial Defence. Vol. III (1st ed.). London: Macmillan. OCLC 220616786.
  - No Map Case, map folder on inside back cover; republished IWM-BP b/w maps 1994, IWM-NMP pbk Colour maps 2009
- Edmonds, J. E. (1947). Military Operations: France and Belgium, 8 August – 26 September: The Franco-British Offensive. History of the Great War based on Official Documents by Direction of the Committee of Imperial Defence. Vol. IV (1st ed.). London: HMSO. OCLC 875000881.
  - No Map Case, map folder on inside back cover; republished IWM-BP b/w maps 1993, IWM-NMP pbk Colour maps 2009.
- Edmonds, J. E.; Maxwell-Hyslop, Lieutenant-General Robert (1947). Military Operations: France and Belgium, 26 September – 11 November: The Advance to Victory. History of the Great War based on Official Documents by Direction of the Committee of Imperial Defence. Vol. V (1st ed.). London: HMSO. OCLC 769477029.
  - Addenda and corrigenda sheet in Italy 1915–1919, no Map Case, map folder on inside back cover; republished IWM-BP b/w maps 1993, IWM-NMP pbk. colour maps 2009.

==== Gallipoli ====
- Aspinall-Oglander, Brigadier-General Cecil Faber; Gordon, Captain George Stuart; Ellison, Lieutenant-General Sir Gerald (1929). Military Operations: Gallipoli, Inception of the Campaign to May 1915. History of the Great War Based on Official Documents by Direction of the Committee of Imperial Defence. Vol. I (1st ed.). London: Heinemann. OCLC 852066865. accompanying Maps (A. F. Becke) and Appendices volume

Republished by Imperial War Museum Department of Printed Books and Battery Press 1992.

- Aspinall-Oglander, C. F. (1932). Military Operations: Gallipoli, May 1915 to the Evacuation. History of the Great War Based on Official Documents by Direction of the Committee of Imperial Defence. Vol. II (1st ed.). London: Heinemann. OCLC 278615923. accompanying Maps (A. F. Becke) and Appendices volume

Republished by Imperial War Museum Department of Printed Books and Battery Press 1992.

The Historical Section wanted quick publication to rebut recriminations and criticism of individuals in unofficial histories. George Gordon, commissioned in 1919, wrote three chapters and resigned before he was sacked. In 1923, Lieutenant-General Gerald Ellison, a staff officer at Gallipoli with confirmed views, took over and expanded first volume to nine chapters; criticised inefficiency and bungling, named culprits, including Winston Churchill, the First Lord of the Admiralty (1911–1915). In 1924, the Committee for Control wanted redrafts to remove blame and references to politicians; Ellison refused and was asked to resign; Brigadier-General C. F. Aspinall-Oglander, another staff officer at Gallipoli with similar views, took over in 1925, retained much offending material, adding more using forms of words retaining the sense of criticisms, moving passages to different chapters or volumes, satisfying the committee but not Edmonds. A serial abridged edition was published in the Daily Telegraph in 1932. IWM-BP b/w maps published in 1992.

==== Italy ====
- Edmonds, J. E.; Davies, Sir Henry Rodolph (1949). Military Operations: Italy 1915–1919. History of the Great War based on Official Documents by Direction of the Committee of Imperial Defence. Maps in rear cover folder. London: HMSO. OCLC 4839237.
  - Republished Imperial War Museum Department of Printed Books and Battery Press, b/w maps 1992.

==== Macedonia ====
- Falls, C. B. (1933). Military Operations: Macedonia, From the Outbreak of War to the spring of 1917. History of the Great War based on Official Documents by Direction of the Committee of Imperial Defence. Vol. I. accompanying Map Case (1st ed.). London: HMSO. OCLC 492810598.
  - Republished Imperial War Museum Department of Printed Books and Battery Press, b/w maps, 1996.
- Falls, C. B. (1935). Military Operations: Macedonia, From the Spring of 1917 to the End of the War. History of the Great War based on Official Documents by Direction of the Committee of Imperial Defence. Vol. II. accompanying Map Case (1st ed.). London: HMSO. OCLC 602337467.
  - Republished IWM-BP, b/w maps, 1996.

==== Mesopotamia ====
- Moberly, Frederick James (1923). The Campaign in Mesopotamia 1914–1918 Compiled at the Request of the Government of India, under the Direction of the Historical Section of the Committee of Imperial Defence. History of the Great War Based on Official Documents. Vol. I (1st ed.). London: HMSO. OCLC 772784341.
  - August 1914 to April 1916; Indian Office declined to write separate history of the Indian Army and offered funds to the Historical Section instead; reprinted 1927, Imperial War Museum and Battery Press b/w maps 1997
- Moberly, F. J. (1924). The Campaign in Mesopotamia 1914–1918 Compiled at the Request of the Government of India, under the Direction of the Historical Section of the Committee of Imperial Defence. History of the Great War Based on Official Documents. Vol. II (1st ed.). London: HMSO. OCLC 772783874.
  - April 1916 to March 1917, Baghdad, siege and fall of Kut-al-Amara, reprinted IWM-BP, b/w maps 1997
- Moberly, F. J. (1925). The Campaign in Mesopotamia 1914–1918 Compiled at the Request of the Government of India, under the Direction of the Historical Section of the Committee of Imperial Defence. History of the Great War Based on Official Documents. Vol. III (1st ed.). London: HMSO. OCLC 772784343.
  - April 1917, capture of Baghdad; reprinted IWM-BP b/w maps, 1997
- Moberly, F. J. (1927). The Campaign in Mesopotamia 1914–1918 Compiled at the Request of the Government of India, under the Direction of the Historical Section of the Committee of Imperial Defence. History of the Great War Based on Official Documents. Vol. IV (1st ed.). London: HMSO. OCLC 772784344.
  - May 1917 to November 1918, Upper Mesopotamia to the Armistice; republished IWM-BP b/w maps, 1997

==== Persia ====
- Moberly, Frederick James (1929). Operations in Persia 1914–1919 Compiled at the Request of the Government of India, under the Direction of the Historical Section of the Committee of Imperial Defence. History of the Great War Based on Official Documents. London: HMSO.
  - Written 1928, for Indian Office; Foreign Office fears of agreements with Tsarist Russia being exposed by USSR, showing unlawful British actions led to request for suppression. Restricted issue agreed 1929, volumes to India marked Secret, remainder Confidential; pbk and bound on issue. Republished IWM-HMSO 1987 with ISBN 978-0-11-290453-3.

==== Togoland and the Cameroons ====
- Moberly, Frederick James (1931). Military Operations: Togoland and the Cameroons, 1914–1916. History of the Great War based on Official Documents. Compiled by Arrangement with the Colonial Office, under the Direction of the Committee of Imperial Defence. London: HMSO. OCLC 5338104.
  - Republished Imperial War Museum-Battery Press, b/w maps, 1995.

=== Occupations ===
- Edmonds, J. E. (2010). The Occupation of Constantinople 1918–1923. History of the Great War based on Official Documents by Direction of the Committee of Imperial Defence. draft provisional history 1944, unpublished (pbk. ed.). Uckfield: Naval and Military Press. ISBN 978-1-84574-879-1.
  - Planned and researched 1943 but publication cancelled. Draft completed by Edmonds, in 1944, when the Rhineland volume was authorised but not published. Copy held at the National Archives.
- Edmonds, J. E. (1944). The Occupation of the Rhineland 1918–1929. History of the Great War based on Official Documents by Direction of the Committee of Imperial Defence. London: HMSO. OCLC 27952490.
  - Two volumes planned for occupations of Germany and Turkey cancelled after Foreign Office objections. Research continued in 1930s, interest revived 1942. Rhineland volume commissioned and completed 1943. Published 1944, marked Confidential, 100 copies printed. Republished IWM-HMSO, green dj, colour maps, 1987, IWM-NMP pbk. Colour maps, 2009.

=== Order of Battle ===
- Becke, Major A. F. (1935). Order of Battle of Divisions: The Regular British Divisions Part 1. History of the Great War Based on Official Documents (1st ed.). London: HMSO. OCLC 929528172.
  - Addenda and corrigenda sheets with parts 3A and 3B; republished Roy Westlake Books 1989, IWM-NMP 2009.
- Becke, A. F. (1936). Order of Battle of Divisions: The Territorial Force Mounted Divisions and the 1st-Line Territorial Force Divisions (42nd–56th) Part 2A. History of the Great War Based on Official Documents (1st ed.). London: HMSO. OCLC 929528206.
  - Three addenda and corrigenda sheets issued with parts 3A, 3B and 4, republished Roy Westlake Books 1989, IWM-NMP 2009.
- Becke, A. F. (1937). Order of Battle of Divisions: The 2nd-Line Territorial Force Divisions (57th–69th) with the Home Service Divisions (71st–73rd) and 74th and 75th Divisions Part 2B. History of the Great War Based on Official Documents (1st ed.). London: HMSO. OCLC 929528344.
  - Three addenda and corrigenda sheets issued with parts 3A, 3B and 4, republished Roy Westlake Books 1988, IWM-NMP 2009.
- Becke, A. F. (1938). Order of Battle of Divisions: New Army Divisions (9th–26th) Part 3A. History of the Great War Based on Official Documents (1st ed.). London: HMSO. OCLC 421375028.
  - Three addenda and corrigenda sheets with parts 3A, 3B and 4, republished by Roy Westlake Books with Part 3B as one volume 1989, IWM-NMP 2009.
- Becke, A. F. (1945). Order of Battle of Divisions: New Army Divisions (30th–41st) and 63rd (RN) Division Part 3B. History of the Great War Based on Official Documents (1st ed.). London: HMSO. OCLC 493146758.
  - Addenda and corrigenda sheet issued, republished Roy Westlake Books with Part 3A as one volume 1989, IWM-NMP 2009.
- Becke, A. F. (1945). Order of Battle of Divisions: The Army Council, G.H.Q.s, Armies and Corps, 1914–1918 Part 4. History of the Great War Based on Official Documents (1st ed.). London: HMSO. OCLC 650201154.
  - Addenda and corrigenda sheet issued with the volume and with Military Operations: Italy. Republished Roy Westlake Books 1989, IWM-NMP 2009.

==== Order of Battle (unofficial) ====
- Perry, F. W. (1993). Order of Battle of Divisions: The Divisions of Australia, Canada and New Zealand and those in East Africa Part 5A. History of the Great War Based on Official Documents (1st ed.). Newport: Roy Westlake Books. ISBN 978-1-871167-25-2.
  - Part 5 planned but not written by Becke; compiled by F. W. Perry in the 1990s as parts 5A and 5B as informal additions to the Official History.
- Perry, F. W. (1993). Order of Battle of Divisions: The Indian Army Divisions Part 5B. History of the Great War Based on Official Documents (1st ed.). Newport: Roy Westlake Books. ISBN 978-1-871167-23-8.
- Becke, A. F.; Westlake, R. (2009). Order of Battle of Divisions: Index. History of the Great War Based on Official Documents (1st ed.). Uckfield: Naval and Military Press. ISBN 978-1-84734-925-5.
  - Westlake expanded the Becke index from Divisional and Brigade references to battalions, artillery batteries, field companies, field ambulances, machine-gun companies, trench mortar batteries, mobile veterinary sections in parts 1, 2A, 2B, 3A and 3B.

=== Statistics ===
- Statistics of the Military Effort of the British Empire During the Great War 1914–1920 (online scan ed.). London: War Office. 1920. OCLC 1318955.
  - Republished London Stamp Exchange, 1987, IWM-NMP pbk 1995, 2001.

=== Transport ===
- Henniker, A. M. (1937). Transportation on the Western Front, 1914–1918. History of the Great War Based on Official Documents by Direction of the Committee of Imperial Defence. accompanying Map Case. London: HMSO. OCLC 5052719.
  - Republished Imperial War Museum-Battery Press, b/w maps, 1992, Imperial War Museum-Naval and Military Press, pbk, colour maps, 2009.

=== DVD-ROM ===
- Chasseaud, Peter; Bridger, Geoff; Cave, Terry (2010). Edmonds, J. E. (ed.). Military Operations: France and Belgium. The Official History of the Great War 1914–1918 (DVD-ROM ed.). Uckfield: Naval and Military Press in association with the Imperial War Museum. ISBN 978-1-84574-901-9.
- Edmonds, J. E., ed. (2011). Military Operations: Other Theatres. The Official History of the Great War 1914–1923 (DVD-ROM ed.). Uckfield: Naval and Military Press in association with the Imperial War Museum. ISBN 978-1-84574-962-0.

=== War in the Air ===
All volumes with title page History of the Great War Based on Official Documents by Direction of the Historical Section of the Committee of Imperial Defence, second title page has War in the Air and volume number.

- Raleigh, Walter Alexander (1922). The War in the Air, Being the Story of The part played in the Great War by the Royal Air Force. History of the Great War Based on Official Documents by Direction of the Historical Section of the Committee of Imperial Defence. Vol. I (1st ed.). Oxford: Clarendon Press. OCLC 785856329.
  - Raleigh died after completing volume I. Events, Royal Flying Corps (RFC) pre-1914 to winter 1914 France and Royal Naval Air Service (RNAS) anti-Zeppelin raids. Republished Hamish Hamilton 1969, Imperial War Museum Department of Printed Books and The Battery Press (IWM-BP) 1998, the Imperial War Museum Department of Printed Books and Naval and Military Press (IWM-NMP) pbk 2002
- Jones, Henry Albert (1928). The War in the Air, Being the Story of The part played in the Great War by the Royal Air Force. History of the Great War Based on Official Documents by Direction of the Historical Section of the Committee of Imperial Defence. Vol. II. London: Clarendon Press. OCLC 924164573.
  - Air operations RFC, Dardanelles, Western Front (Spring 1915 – Autumn 1916), RNAS operations 1915; republished Hamish Hamilton 1969, IWM-BP 1999, IWM-NMP pbk, 2002.
- Jones, H. A. (1931). The War in the Air, Being the Story of The part played in the Great War by the Royal Air Force. History of the Great War Based on Official Documents by Direction of the Historical Section of the Committee of Imperial Defence. Vol. III. accompanying Map Case. London: Clarendon Press. OCLC 831226907.
  - Air operations RFC, East Africa, SMS Königsberg, South-West Africa, German bombing of Britain 1914–1916, Western front winter 1916 – spring 1917, Arras. Republished IWM-BP 1998, IWM-NMP pbk. 2002.
- Jones, H. A. (1934). The War in the Air, Being the Story of The part played in the Great War by the Royal Air Force. History of the Great War Based on Official Documents by Direction of the Historical Section of the Committee of Imperial Defence. Vol. IV. accompanying Map Case. London: Clarendon Press. OCLC 836194155.
  - Air operations RFC Western Front Summer 1917 – Summer 1918, Messines. Republished IWM-BP 1998, IWM-NMP pbk 2002
- Jones, H. A. (1935). The War in the Air, Being the Story of The part played in the Great War by the Royal Air Force. History of the Great War Based on Official Documents by Direction of the Historical Section of the Committee of Imperial Defence. Vol. V. accompanying Map Case. London: Clarendon Press. OCLC 494596777.
  - German bombing of Britain 1917–1918, RFC Egypt, Darfur, Palestine 1914–1917, Mesopotamia 1916 – March 1918, RNAS Mediterranean 1916 – March 1918; republished IWM-BP 1998, IWM-NMP pbk. 2002.
- Jones, H. A. (1937). The War in the Air, Being the Story of The part played in the Great War by the Royal Air Force. History of the Great War Based on Official Documents by Direction of the Historical Section of the Committee of Imperial Defence. Vol. VI. London: Clarendon Press. OCLC 769886212.
  - RAF strategic bombing, Mesopotamia, Iran, India, Macedonia, Italy 1914–1917, RNAS in Mediterranean Summer and Autumn 1918, RNAS in Home Waters, RFC Western Front, Amiens, Bapaume. Republished IWM-NMP pbk. 2002, IWM-BP 2003.
- Jones, H. A. (1937). The War in the Air, Being the Story of The part played in the Great War by the Royal Air Force: Appendices. History of the Great War Based on Official Documents by Direction of the Historical Section of the Committee of Imperial Defence. Vol. VII. London: Clarendon Press. OCLC 769886213.
  - Republished IWM-NMP pbk 2002, IWM-BP 2003

=== War at Sea ===
==== Naval Operations ====
- Corbett, Julian Stafford (1938). Naval Operations: To the Battle of the Falklands, December 1914 (with accompanying Map Case). History of the Great War Based on Official Documents by Direction of the Historical Section of the Committee of Imperial Defence. Vol. I (1st ed.). London: Longmans, Green & Co. OCLC 929536844.
  - Escape of SMS Goeben and SMS Breslau, Heligoland Bight, British ship losses, searches for German cruisers, Antwerp, Coronel and Falkland Islands, occupation of German colonies Africa and Far East. Revised and corrected 2nd edition 1938, mainly chapters VII and XVII, paper dust jacket. Revised text republished Imperial War Museum-Battery Press 1997, ndj, Imperial War Museum-Naval and Military Press pbk. 2003.
- Corbett, J. S. (1929). Naval Operations: (accompanying Map Case). History of the Great War Based on Official Documents by Direction of the Historical Section of the Committee of Imperial Defence. Vol. II (2nd ed.). London: Longmans, Green & Co. OCLC 754160010.
  - January to May 1915, East Coast raids, Dogger Bank, Sinking of SMS Dresden, Dardanelles failure, loss of RMS Lusitania. Revised and corrected 2nd edition 1929, incorporating information from German and British official histories; republished IWM-BP 1997 ndj, IWM-NMP 2003 pbk
- Corbett, J. S. (1923). Naval Operations (accompanying Map Case). History of the Great War Based on Official Documents by Direction of the Historical Section of the Committee of Imperial Defence. Vol. III (1st ed.). London: Longmans, Green & Co. OCLC 867968279.
  - May 1915 to June 1916, Dardanelles, evacuation, destruction of SMS Königsberg; SS Arabic and HMS Baralong (Baralong incidents), Irish Easter Rising, air raid on Schleswig air base and Battle of Jutland. Draft copied circulated during controversy about failures at Jutland and changes were instigated by Admiral David Beatty about his performance. Republished 1940 incorporating information from German official history, alterations for Beatty not restored; republished IWM-BP ndj 1995, IWM-NMP pbk. 2003.
- Newbolt, Henry (1928). Naval Operations (accompanying Map Case). History of the Great War Based on Official Documents by Direction of the Historical Section of the Committee of Imperial Defence. Vol. IV (1st ed.). London: Longmans, Green & Co. OCLC 220475138.
  - Corbett died, replaced by Sir Henry John Newbolt. June 1916 to April 1917, German U-boat and surface raider campaigns, loss of HMS Hampshire, death of Lord Kitchener, operations in African, Middle East and Mediterranean waters. Evacuation of Serbian Army, war in Greece; republished IWM-BP, ndj 1996, IWM-NMP pbk. 2003.
- Newbolt, H. J. (1931). Naval Operations (accompanying Map Case). History of the Great War Based on Official Documents by Direction of the Historical Section of the Committee of Imperial Defence. Vol. V (1st ed.). London: Longmans, Green & Co. OCLC 220475309.
  - April 1917 to November 1918, continuation of anti-U-boat campaign, Convoy System, Northern Barrage, Zeebrugge and Ostend raids; republished IWM-BP, ndj 1996, IWM-NMP pbk 2003.

==== Seaborne Trade ====
- Fayle, Charles Ernest (1920). Seaborne Trade: The Cruiser Period. History of the Great War based on Official Documents by Direction of the Committee of Imperial Defence. Vol. I. accompanying Map Case. London: John Murray. OCLC 916815396. Republished Imperial War Museum Department of Printed Books and Battery Press 1997.
  - Pre-war and beginning of hostilities, maritime law, control of Atlantic, North Sea mining, trade in Far East, Pacific, cruises of SMS Emden and SMS Karlsruhe, battles of Coronel and Falklands, U-boat warfare, Auxiliary cruisers.
- Fayle, C. E. (1923). Seaborne Trade: From the Opening of the Submarine Campaign to the Appointment of the Shipping Controller. History of the Great War based on Official Documents by Direction of the Committee of Imperial Defence. Vol. II. Submarine Campaign Part I. London: John Murray. OCLC 934102193. Republished IWM-BP 1998.
  - U-boat operations February 1915 to December 1916
- Fayle, C. E. (1924). Seaborne Trade: The Period of Unrestricted Submarine Warfare. History of the Great War based on Official Documents by Direction of the Committee of Imperial Defence. Vol. III. Submarine campaign Part II. London: John Murray. OCLC 831182383. Republished IWM-BP 1998.
  - U-boat operations December 1916 to November 1918

==== Blockades ====
- Bell, Archibald Colquhoun (1961) [1937]. The Blockade of the Central Empires 1914–1918. History of the Great War based on Official Documents by Direction of the Committee of Imperial Defence (1st ed.). London: HMSO. OCLC 4476363.
  - Completed 1921, unpublished at request of the Foreign Office, due to the legal ramifications of blockade. Published HMSO 1937, marked Confidential as A History of the Blockade of Germany and the Countries Associated with her in the Great War, Austria-Hungary, Bulgaria and Turkey, 1914–1918, restricted circulation; republished and offered to the public, HMSO, 1961; IWM-NMP pbk 2013. German translation published 1943 for general sale.

==== Merchant Navy ====
- Hurd, Archibald Spicer (1921). The Merchant Navy. History of the Great War based on Official Documents by Direction of the Committee of Imperial Defence. Vol. I. London: John Murray. OCLC 669059002. Republished Imperial War Museum Department of Printed Books and Naval & Military Press 2003.
  - Cruises of SMS Emden, defence against commerce raiders, Auxiliary patrols, U-boat campaign, sinking of RMS Lusitania.
- Hurd, A. S. (1924). The Merchant Navy. History of the Great War based on Official Documents by Direction of the Committee of Imperial Defence. Vol. II. London: John Murray. OCLC 934752271. Republished IWM-NMP 2003.
  - U-boats in UK Home Waters Auxiliary Craft, Fishermen, Fishing craft in war service, Troop Transports, Blockade of Germany, Mediterranean shipping, SS Persia, execution of Captain Charles Fryatt. Republished IWM-NMP 2003.
- Hurd, A. S. (1929). The Merchant Navy. History of the Great War based on Official Documents by Direction of the Committee of Imperial Defence. Vol. III. London: John Murray. OCLC 669078530. Republished IWM-NMP 2003.
  - Patrolling February 1917 to November 1918, 10th Cruiser Squadron March to December 1917, U-boat campaign, Dazzle camouflage, Auxiliary patrols, attacks on hospital ships, Merchant sailor prisoners; republished IWM-NMP 2003.

=== Ministry of Munitions ===
- The History of the Ministry of Munitions: Industrial Mobilisations 1914–15 Part I: Munitions Supply 1914–15, Part II: The Treasury Agreement, Part III: The Armaments Output Committee, Part IV: The Munitions of War Act 1915. Vol. I (repr. Imperial War Museum Department of Printed Books and the Naval and Military Press ed.). London: HMSO. 2009 [1920]. ISBN 978-1-283-69436-0.
  - Published as paperback booklets, usually bound in twelve volumes; Volume II Part I published in three sections, 1920, 1921 and 1922, for reasons unknown. Republished in twelve volumes in microfiche, Harverster Press 1976, bound in 13 volumes, Imperial War Museum Department of Printed Books and the Naval and Military Press, hb. and pbk. Volume II divided into II Part I and II Part II, 2009.
- The History of the Ministry of Munitions: General Organisation of Munitions Supply Part I: Administrative Policy and Organization, Part II: Local Organization in the United Kingdom, Part III: Munitions Organizations in the United States of America, Part IV: Munitions Organizations in Canada, Part V: Munitions Organizations in India, Part V: Munitions Organizations in Australia, Part VI: Continental Organization, Part VII: Inter-Allied Organization. Vol. II (repr. IWM and NMP pbk ed.). London: HMSO. 2009 [1920]. ISBN 978-1-84734-901-9.
- The History of the Ministry of Munitions: Finance and Contracts Part I: Financial Administration, Part II: Contracts, Part III: Financing of Production. Vol. III (repr. IWM and NMP pbk ed.). London: HMSO. 2009 [1922]. ISBN 978-1-84734-877-7.
- The History of the Ministry of Munitions: The Supply and Control of Labour 1915–1916 Part I: Labour Supply July–December 1915, Part II: Labour Regulations and the Munitions of War (Amendment) Act 1916, Part III: The Limitation of Recruiting, Part IV: The Progress of Dilution. Vol. IV (repr. IWM and NMP pbk ed.). London: HMSO. 2009 [1918–1920]. ISBN 978-1-84734-878-4.
- The History of the Ministry of Munitions: Wages and Welfare Part I: Control of Men's Wages, Part II: Control of Women's Wages, Part III: Welfare: The Control of Working, Conditions Part IV: The Provision of Canteens, Part V: Provision for the Housing of Munition Workers. Vol. V (repr. IWM and NMP pbk ed.). London: HMSO. 2009 [1922]. ISBN 978-1-84734-955-2.
- The History of the Ministry of Munitions: Manpower and Dilution: Release of Munition Workers for Military Service 1916–17. Vol. VI (repr. IWM and NMP pbk ed.). London: HMSO. 2009 [1918–1922]. ISBN 978-1-84734-880-7.
- The History of the Ministry of Munitions: The Control of Materials Part I: Review of Commercial Control, Part II: Iron and Steel, Part III: Non-Ferrous Metals, Part IV: Materials for Explosives Manufacture, Part V: Transport, Storage and Salvage. Vol. VII (repr. IWM and NMP pbk ed.). London: HMSO. 2009 [1921–1922]. ISBN 978-1-84734-881-4.
- The History of the Ministry of Munitions: Control of Industrial Capacity and Equipment Part I: Review of State Manufacture, Part II: The National Factories, Part III: Engineering Supplies, Part IV: Control of Engineering Capacity: Administrative Machinery. Vol. VIII (repr. IWM and NMP pbk ed.). London: HMSO. 2009 [1921–1922]. ISBN 978-1-84734-882-1.
- The History of the Ministry of Munitions: Review of Munitions Supply. Vol. IX (repr. IWM and NMP pbk ed.). London: HMSO. 2009 [1922]. ISBN 978-1-84734-883-8.
- The History of the Ministry of Munitions: The Supply of Munitions Part I: Guns, Part II: Gun Ammunition: General, Part III: Gun Ammunition: Shell Manufacture, Part IV: Gun Ammunition: Explosives, Part V: Gun Ammunition: Filling and Completing, Part VI: Anti-Aircraft Supplies. Vol. X (repr. IWM and NMP pbk ed.). London: HMSO. 2009 [1921–1922]. ISBN 978-1-84734-884-5.
- The History of the Ministry of Munitions: The Supply of Munitions Part I: Trench Warfare Supplies, Part II: Chemical Warfare Supplies, Part III: Optical Munitions and Glassware, Part IV: Rifles, Part V: Machine Guns, Part VI: Small Arms Ammunition. Vol. XI (repr. IWM and NMP pbk ed.). London: HMSO. 2009 [1920–1922]. ISBN 978-1-84734-885-2.
- The History of the Ministry of Munitions: The Supply of Munitions Part I: Aircraft, Part II: Aerial Bombs, Part III: Tanks, Part IV: Mechanical Transport Vehicles, Part V: Railway Materials and Ropeways, Part VI Agricultural Machinery. Vol. XII (repr. IWM and NMP pbk ed.). London: HMSO. 2009 [1919–1921]. ISBN 978-1-84734-886-9.

=== Medical ===
==== Casualties ====
- Mitchell, Thomas John; Smith, G. M. (1931). Casualties and Medical Statistics of the Great War. History of the Great War Based on Official Documents by Direction of the Committee of Imperial Defence. London: HMSO. OCLC 14739880.
  - Republished IWM-BP 1997

==== Diseases ====
- Macpherson, Major-General Sir William Grant; Herringham, Sir Wilmot Parker; Elliott, T. R.; Balfour, Sir Andrew, eds. (1922). Medical Services: Diseases of the War. History of the Great War Based on Official Documents by Direction of the Committee of Imperial Defence. Vol. I. London: HMSO. OCLC 816503858.
- Macpherson, Sir W. G.; Herringham, Sir W. P.; Elliott, Colonel Thomas Renton; Balfour, Lieutenant-Colonel Sir Andrew, eds. (1923). Medical Services: Diseases of the War: Including the Medical Aspects of Aviation and Gas Warfare and Gas Poisoning in Tanks and Mines. History of the Great War Based on Official Documents by Direction of the Committee of Imperial Defence. Vol. II. London: HMSO. OCLC 729637196.

==== General ====
- Macpherson, Major-General Sir William Grant (1921). Medical Services General History: Medical Services in the United Kingdom; in British Garrisons Overseas and During Operations against Tsingtau, in Togoland, the Cameroons and South-West Africa. History of the Great War Based on Official Documents by Direction of the Committee of Imperial Defence. Vol. I. London: HMSO. OCLC 84456080.
  - Republished Imperial War Museum-Naval and Military Press, pbk 2009
- Macpherson, Sir W. G. (1923). Medical Services General History: The Medical Services on the Western Front and during the Operations in France and Belgium in 1914 and 1915. History of the Great War Based on Official Documents by Direction of the Committee of Imperial Defence. Vol. II. OCLC 664817273.
  - Republished IWM-NMP pbk 2009
- Macpherson, Sir W. G. (1924). Medical Services General History: Medical Services during the Operations on the Western Front in 1916, 1917 and 1918; in Italy and in Egypt and Palestine. History of the Great War Based on Official Documents by Direction of the Committee of Imperial Defence. Vol. III. OCLC 494443348.
  - Republished IWM-NMP, pbk 2009
- Macpherson, Sir W. G. (1924). Medical Services General History: Medical Services During the Operations on the Gallipoli Peninsula; in Macedonia; in Mesopotamia and North-West Persia; in East Africa; in the Aden Protectorate and in North Russia. Ambulance Transport during the War. History of the Great War Based on Official Documents by Direction of the Committee of Imperial Defence. Vol. IV. OCLC 82993519.
  - Republished IWM-NMP, pbk 2009
- Macpherson, Sir W. G.; Leishman, Colonel Sir William Boog; Cummins, Colonel Stevenson Lyle, eds. (1923). Medical Services General History: Pathology. History of the Great War Based on Official Documents by Direction of the Committee of Imperial Defence. London: HMSO. OCLC 14782114.

==== Hygiene ====
- Macpherson, Sir W. G.; Horrocks, Colonel Sir William Heaton; Beveridge, Major-General Wilfred William Ogilvy, eds. (1923). Medical Services: Hygiene of the War. History of the Great War Based on Official Documents by Direction of the Committee of Imperial Defence. Vol. I. London: HMSO. OCLC 69007183.
- Macpherson, Sir W. G.; Horrocks, W. H.; Beveridge, W. W. O., eds. (1923). Medical Services: Hygiene of the War. History of the Great War Based on Official Documents by Direction of the Committee of Imperial Defence. Vol. II. London: HMSO. OCLC 926955082.
  - Marmite Food Extraction Co. reprinted 1923, ch 3 pages 83–86, ch 5 pages 150–152, for advertising.

==== Surgery ====
- Macpherson, Sir W. G.; Bowlby, Major-General Sir Anthony A.; Wallace, Major-General Sir Cuthbert Sidney; English, Colonel Sir Thomas Crisp, eds. (1922). Medical Services: Surgery of the War. History of the Great War Based on Official Documents by Direction of the Committee of Imperial Defence. Vol. I. London: HMSO. OCLC 816503860.
- Macpherson, Sir W. G.; Bowlby, Sir A. A.; Wallace, Sir C.; English, Sir C., eds. (1922). Medical Services: Surgery of the War. History of the Great War Based on Official Documents by Direction of the Committee of Imperial Defence. Vol. II. London: HMSO. OCLC 816503064.

==== Veterinary ====
- Blenkinsop, Sir Layton John; Rainey, John Wakefield, eds. (1925). Medical Services: Veterinary Services. History of the Great War Based on Official Documents by Direction of the Committee of Imperial Defence. London: HMSO. OCLC 5717027.

=== Additional volumes ===
- Army. The Evacuation of Northern Russia, 1919. Accounts and Papers. Great Britain. Parliament. 1920. OCLC 926356276.
- Eastern Siberia. Handbooks Prepared under the Direction of the Historical Section of the Foreign Office. London: HMSO. 1920. OCLC 937255968.
- The Official Names of the Battles and other Engagements Fought by the Military Forces of the British Empire during the Great War, 1914–1919, and the Third Afghan War, 1919: Report of the Battles Nomenclature Committee as approved by the Army Council (Report). London: HMSO. 1922. OCLC 21466705.
- A Short History of the Royal Air Force. Air Publication No. 125 (2nd rev. ed.). London: Air Ministry, Air Historical Branch. 1936 [1920]. OCLC 4356318.

== Gallery ==
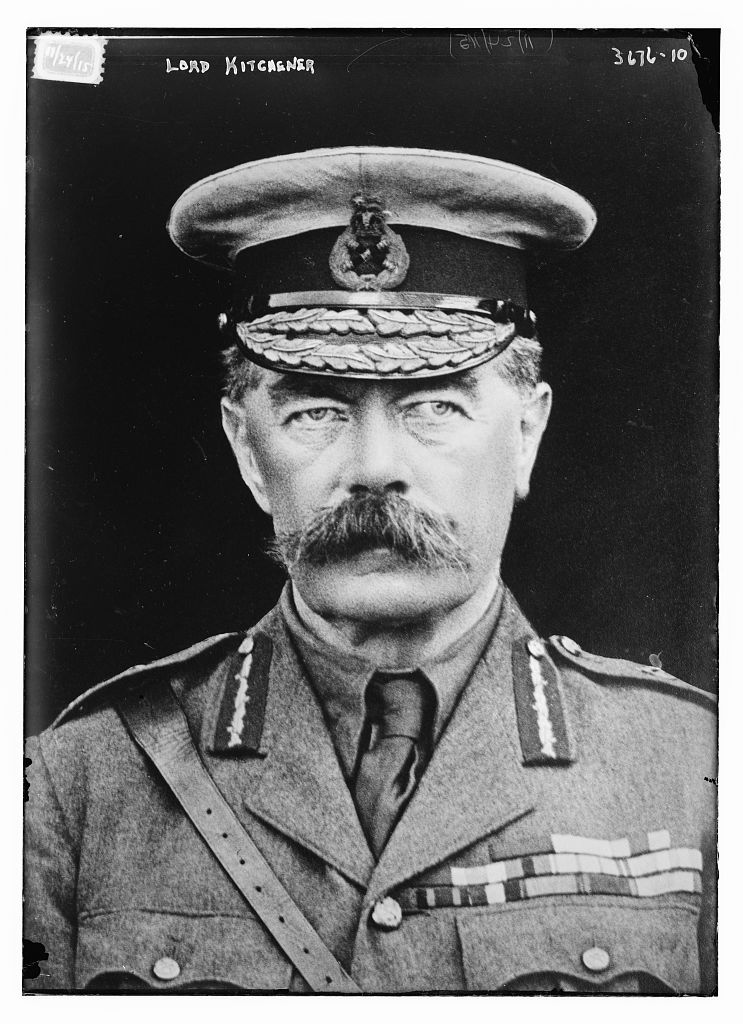
Herbert Kitchener, circa 1915

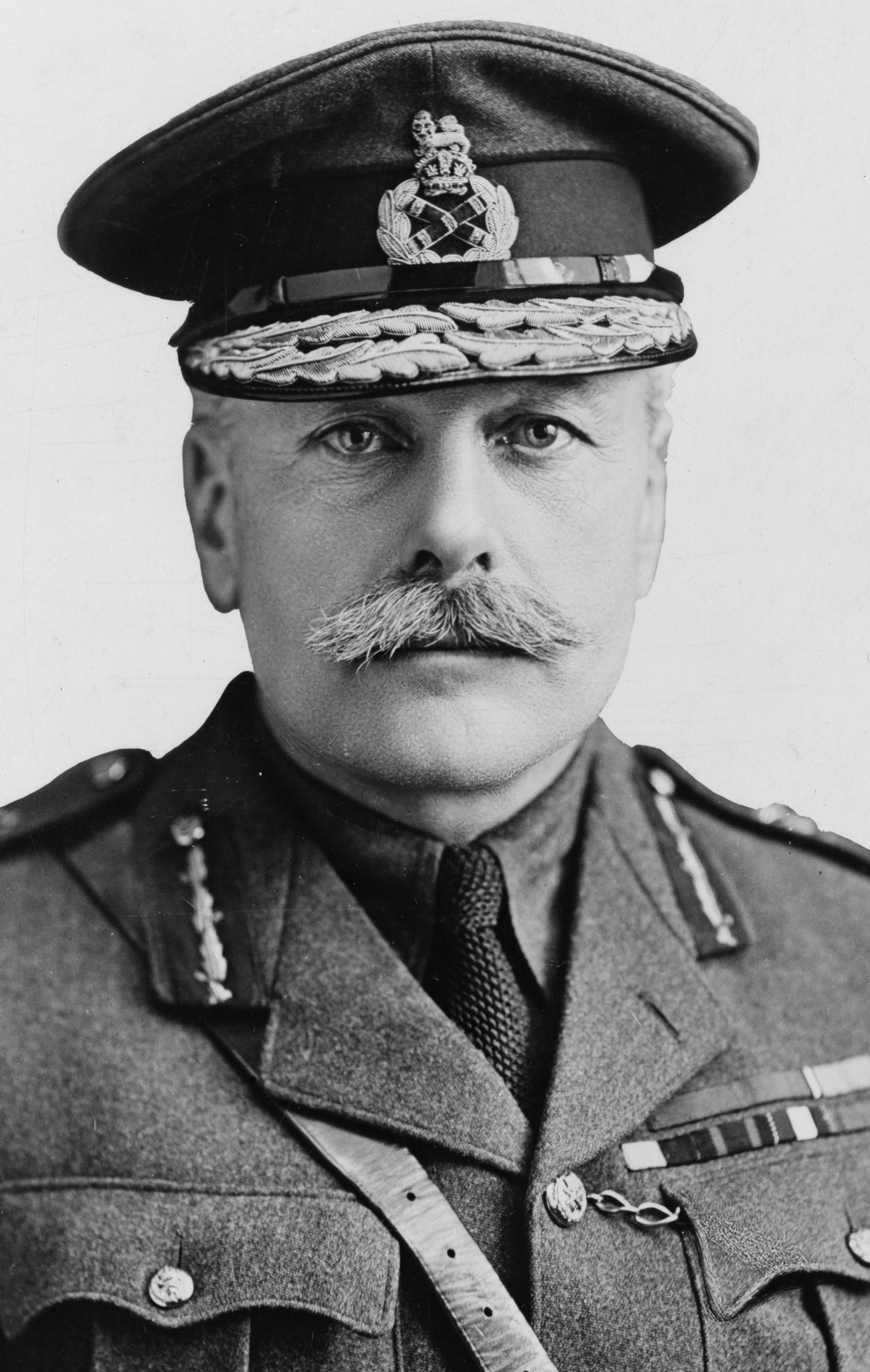
Douglas Haig

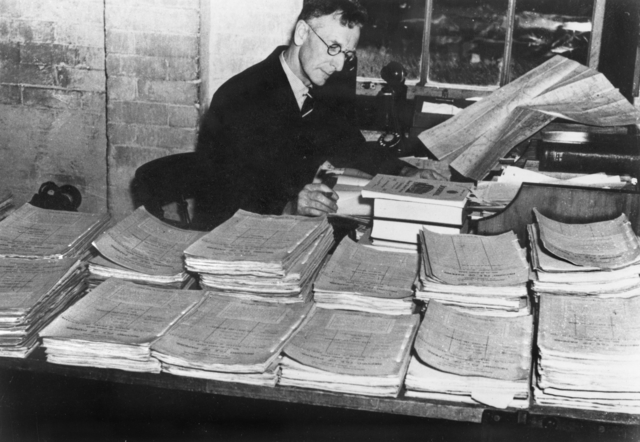
Charles Bean with files

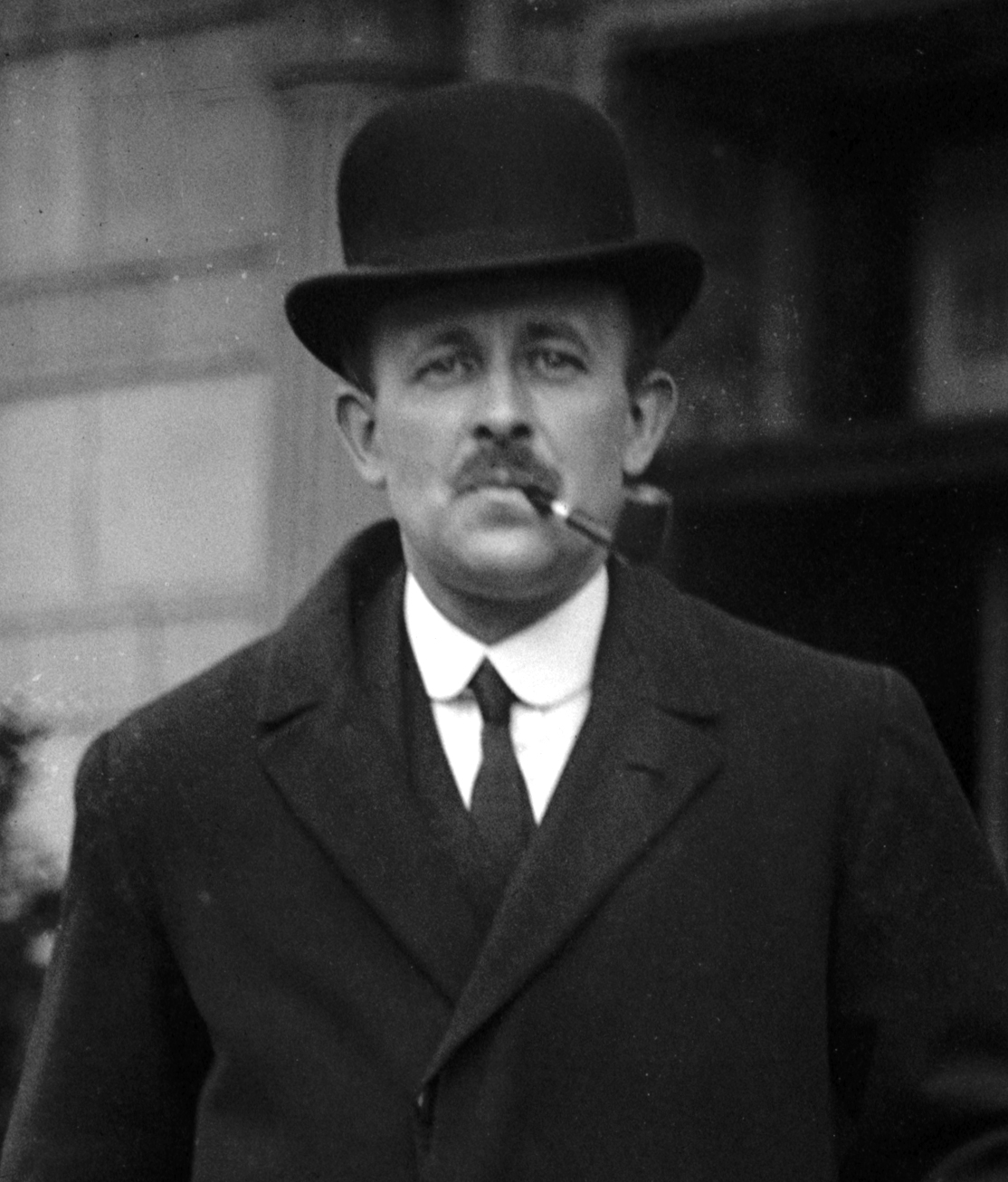
Maurice Hankey

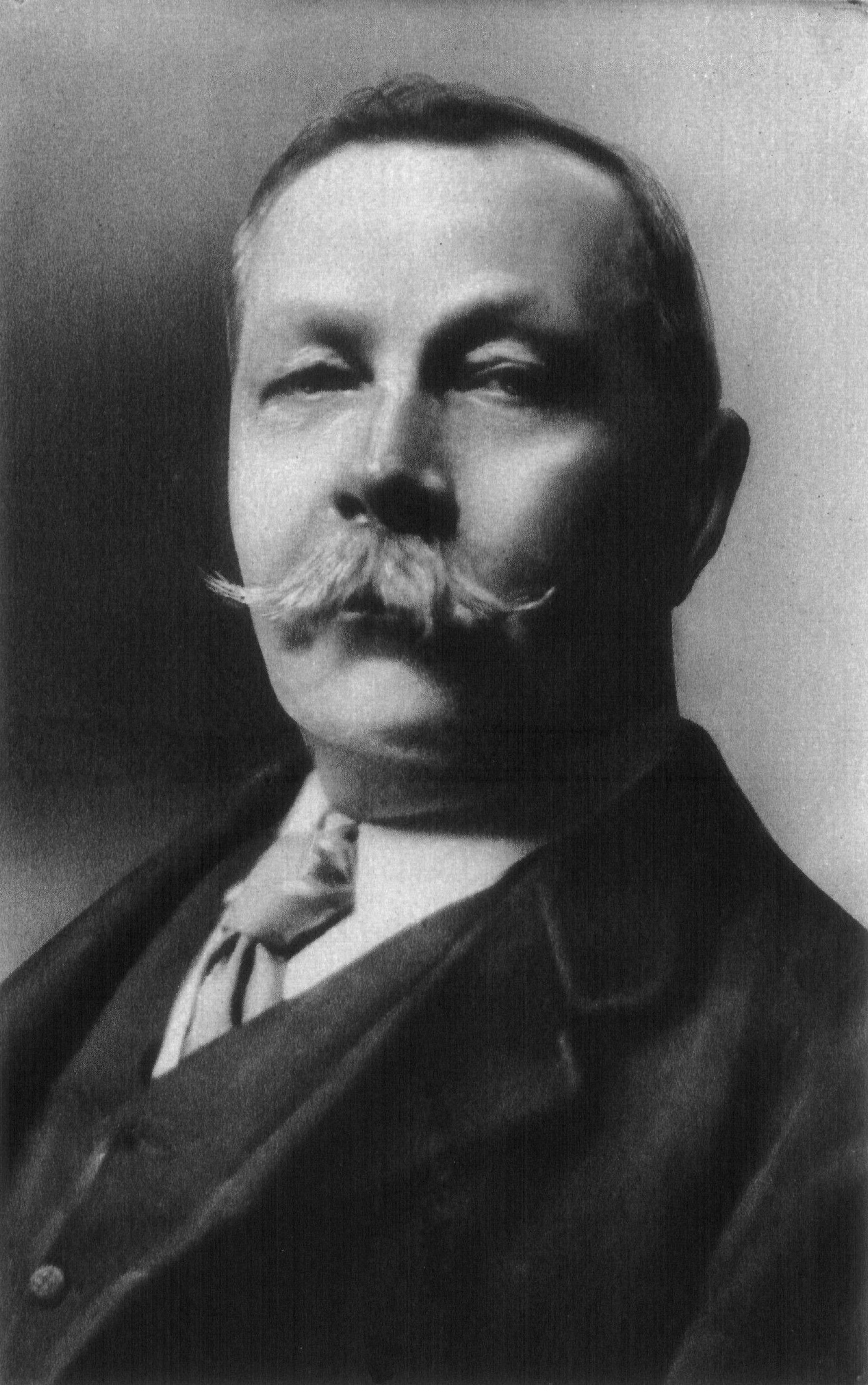
Arthur Conan Doyle

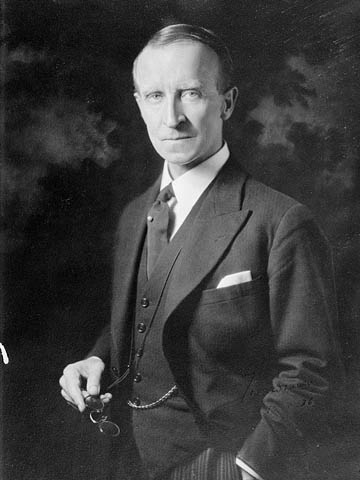
John Buchan

== See also ==
- Official history
