= Cyril Falls =

British military historian

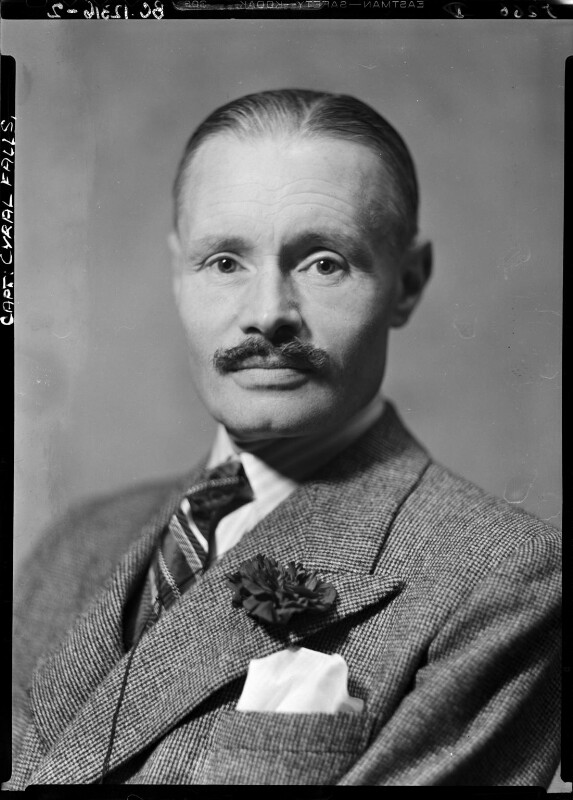
- Falls in 1940
- Born: 2 March 1888; Dublin, Ireland
- Died: 23 April 1971 (aged 83); Walton-on-Thames, England
- Occupations: Historian, journalist
- Writing career
- Period: 1915–1971
- Subjects: British and Irish military history

Cyril Bentham Falls CBE (2 March 1888 – 23 April 1971) was a British officer, military historian, journalist, and academic, noted for his works on the First World War. He was born in Ireland and spent most of his life in England.

== Early life ==
Falls was born in Dublin, Ireland, on 2 March 1888, the eldest son of Sir Charles Falls, an Ulster landowner in County Tyrone. He received his formal education at the Portora Royal School, Enniskillen, and London University. At the age of 27, he published his first book, Rudyard Kipling: A Critical Study (1915).

== First World War ==
During the First World War, he received a commission into the British Army as a subaltern in the Royal Inniskilling Fusiliers. He served as a Staff Officer in the Headquarters of the 36th (Ulster) Division and the 62nd (2nd West Riding) Division. He received the French Croix de Guerre, and was discharged from the British Army with the rank of captain.

== Military history career ==
Immediately after leaving the army, Falls wrote a history of one of the divisions that he had served with during the war, entitled The History of the 36th (Ulster) Division, that was published in 1922. From 1923 to 1939, he was employed by the Historical Section of the Committee of Imperial Defence, researching and writing the text of several volumes of the official History of the Great War. During the Second World War, from 1939 to 1945, he was the military correspondent for The Times.

From 1946 to 1953, he held the post of Chichele Professor of Military History at All Souls College, Oxford. From the late 1940s through to his death in the early 1970s, he was a productive writer of military histories, publishing detailed studies as well as general works for the commercial market, his final two titles being published posthumously. The historian, Sir Michael Howard, later described Falls' work The History of the 36th (Ulster) Division (1922),

... containing some of the finest descriptions of conditions on the Western Front to be found anywhere in the literature of the war.

Falls was made Commander of the British Empire in 1967.

== Death ==
Falls died aged 83 in Walton-on-Thames, in the county of Surrey, on 23 April 1971.

== Publications ==
- Falls, C. (1915). Rudyard Kipling: A Critical Study. London: Martin Secker. OCLC 7888813.
- Falls, C. (1996) [1922]. The History of the 36th (Ulster) Division (Constable ed.). Belfast: McCaw, Stevenson & Orr. ISBN 978-0-09-476630-3.
- Falls, Cyril; MacMunn, G. (1930). Military Operations Egypt & Palestine from the Outbreak of War with Germany to June 1917. History of the Great War Based on Official Documents by Direction of the Historical Section of the Committee of Imperial Defence. Vol. I. London: HMSO. OCLC 610273484.
- Falls, Cyril; Becke, A. F. (maps) (1930). Military Operations Egypt & Palestine from June 1917 to the End of the War. History of the Great War Based on Official Documents by Direction of the Historical Section of the Committee of Imperial Defence. Vol. II. Part I. London: HMSO. OCLC 644354483.
- Falls, Cyril (1930). Military Operations Egypt & Palestine from June 1917 to the End of the War. History of the Great War Based on Official Documents by Direction of the Historical Section of the Committee of Imperial Defence. Vol. II. Part II. London: HMSO. OCLC 256950972.
- Falls, C. (1996) [1933]. Military Operations Macedonia: From the Outbreak of War to the Spring of 1917. History of the Great War Based on Official Documents by Direction of the Historical Section of the Committee of Imperial Defence. Vol. I (repr. Imperial War Museum Department of Printed Books and Battery Press ed.). London and Nashville, TN: HMSO. ISBN 0-89839-242-X.
- Falls, C. (1996) [1935]. Military Operations Macedonia: From the Spring of 1917 to the End of the War. History of the Great War Based on Official Documents by Direction of the Historical Section of the Committee of Imperial Defence. Vol. II (Imperial War Museum and Battery Press ed.). London and Nashville, TN: HMSO. ISBN 0-89839-243-8.
- Falls, C. (1992) [1940]. Military Operations France and Belgium, 1917: The German Retreat to the Hindenburg Line and the Battles of Arras. History of the Great War Based on Official Documents by Direction of the Historical Section of the Committee of Imperial Defence. Vol. I (Imperial War Museum & Battery Press ed.). London: HMSO. ISBN 0-89839-180-6.
- Falls, C. (1941). The Nature of Modern Warfare. New York: OUP. OCLC 502686.
- Falls, C. (1948). The Second World War: A Short History. London: Methuen. OCLC 634221322.
- Falls, C. (1950). Elizabeth's Irish Wars. London: Methuen. OCLC 2031043.
- Falls, C. (1953). A Hundred Years of War. London: Duckworth. OCLC 1136258.
- Falls, C. (1959). The Great War. New York: Putnam. OCLC 1941045.
- Falls, C. (1960). The First World War. London: Longmans, Green & Co. OCLC 2504863.
- Falls, C. (1961). The Art of War: From the Age of Napoleon to the Present Day. New York: Oxford University Press. OCLC 570255.
- Falls, C. (1964). A Concise History of World War I. New York: Praeger.
- Falls, C. (1964). Armageddon, 1918. Philadelphia: Lippincott. OCLC 404500.
- Falls, C. (1966). Caporetto 1917. London: Weidenfeld. OCLC 602750661.
- Falls, C., ed. (1971). Great Military Battles. London: Hamlyn. ISBN 0-600-01652-8.
- Falls, C. (1973). The Birth of Ulster. London: Methuen. ISBN 0-416-78210-8.
- Falls, C.; Croom-Johnson, Norman (1989) [1930]. War Books: An Annotated Bibliography of Books about the Great War (Presidio ed.). London: Peter Davies. ISBN 1-853-67040-5.
