= Launcelot Kiggell =

British Army general (1862–1954)

Lieutenant-General Sir Launcelot Kiggell KCB KCMG
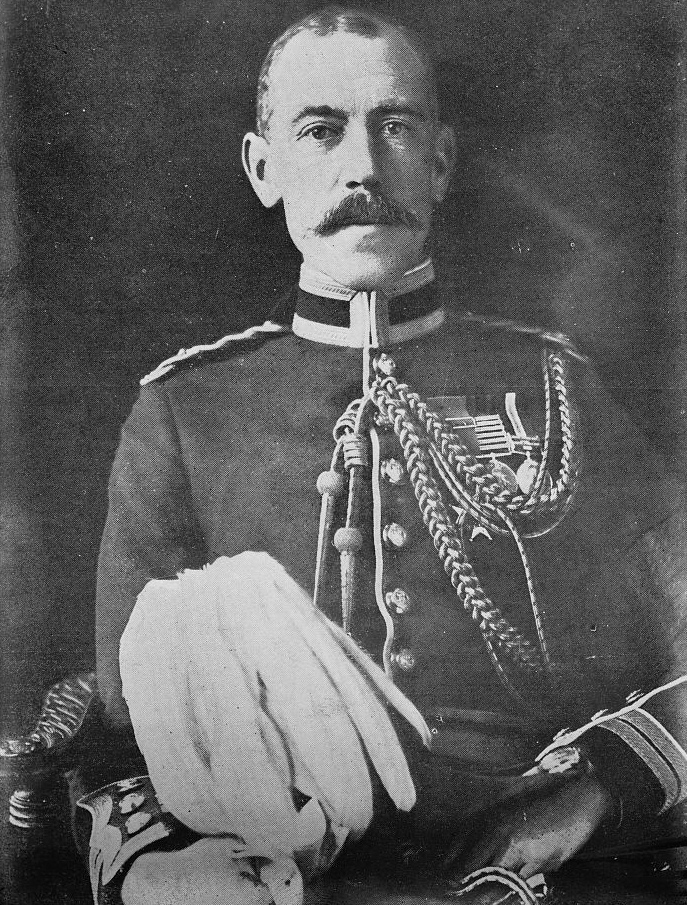
- Kiggell pictured in 1915 during the First World War
- Born: 2 October 1862; County Limerick, Ireland
- Died: 23 February 1954 (aged 91); Felixstowe, Suffolk, England
- Spouse: Eleanor Rose Field
- Military career
- Allegiance: United Kingdom
- Branch: British Army
- Service years: 1882–1920
- Rank: Lieutenant-General
- Nickname: "Kigge"
- Unit: Royal Warwickshire Regiment
- Commands: Staff College, Camberley
- Conflicts: Second Boer War; World War I
- Awards: Knight Commander of the Order of the Bath; Knight Commander of the Order of St Michael and St George

Lieutenant-General Sir Launcelot Edward Kiggell, KCB, KCMG (2 October 1862 – 23 February 1954) was an Irish-born British Army officer who was Chief of the General Staff (CGS) for the British Armies in France under Field Marshal Sir Douglas Haig from late 1915 to 1918.

== Early life and military career ==
Launcelot Edward Kiggell was born in County Limerick on 2 October 1862, the son of Launcelot John Kiggell (1829–1911), a justice of the peace and major in the Cork Light Militia. As a result of his family being "of modest means", he "was not educated at an English public school, a rarity among officers of his generation". He attended the Royal Military College, Sandhurst, and was commissioned into the Royal Warwickshire Regiment of the British Army as a lieutenant on 10 May 1882.

He was adjutant of the 2nd Battalion, Royal Warwicks, from 1886 until 1890 and was promoted captain on 3 April 1889. He attended the Staff College, Camberley, from 1893 to 1894. He was then an instructor at the RMC, Sandhurst, from 1895 to 1897. From 1897 to 1899 he was deputy assistant adjutant-general (DAAG) for instruction at South-Eastern District, and he was promoted to major on 6 April 1898.

== Second Boer War ==
He served in South Africa throughout the Second Boer War. From late 1899 he served on the staff of General Sir Redvers Buller, then spent six months on the staff at HQ at Pretoria. He was promoted to brevet lieutenant colonel on 29 November 1900. He then served as assistant adjutant general (AAG) for Harrismith District, then held the same post in Natal after the end of the war. He was mentioned in dispatches for his services during the war.

After the war had ended, he returned to the United Kingdom in August 1902.

== Inter-war years ==
He was promoted to substantive lieutenant colonel in January 1904, and from then until 1907 he was DAAG at the Staff College, during which time he was promoted to brevet lieutenant colonel in April 1905. In that year he presented a paper to the Aldershot Military Society, which was criticised for excessive emphasis on the lessons of the Napoleonic and Franco-Prussian wars rather than the more recent Second Boer War and Russo-Japanese wars, and "stressing that battles would be localized with reserves conveniently placed within a few hours' march. Unsurprisingly, his audience was critical of this view". He wrote a revised edition of Edward Bruce Hamley's Operations of War. He wanted to change the name of the Staff College to the "War School" and to train commanders rather than just staff officers, a view which he shared with Henry Rawlinson, William Robertson and Douglas Haig, all of whom he would encounter during the First World War.

He was promoted in January 1907 to colonel and was a general staff officer, grade 1 (GSO1) at Horse Guards (army headquarters) from 1907 to 1909. He was awarded a Companion of the Order of the Bath in June 1908. He was then promoted to temporary brigadier general in charge of administration at Scottish Command from March to October 1909. He was then director of staff duties at the War Office from 1909 to 1913, in succession to Haig, of whom he was something of a protégé. He was considered as a successor for Henry Wilson as commandant of the Staff College in 1910, but the post went to Robertson; instead he succeeded Robertson as commandant in October 1913, for which Kiggell was allowed to retain his temporary brigadier's rank. J. F. C. Fuller, a student at the Staff College at the time, saw Kiggell as "a highly educated soldier, but a doctrinaire … he possessed knowledge, but little vision … a dyspeptic, gloomy and doleful man".

== First World War ==
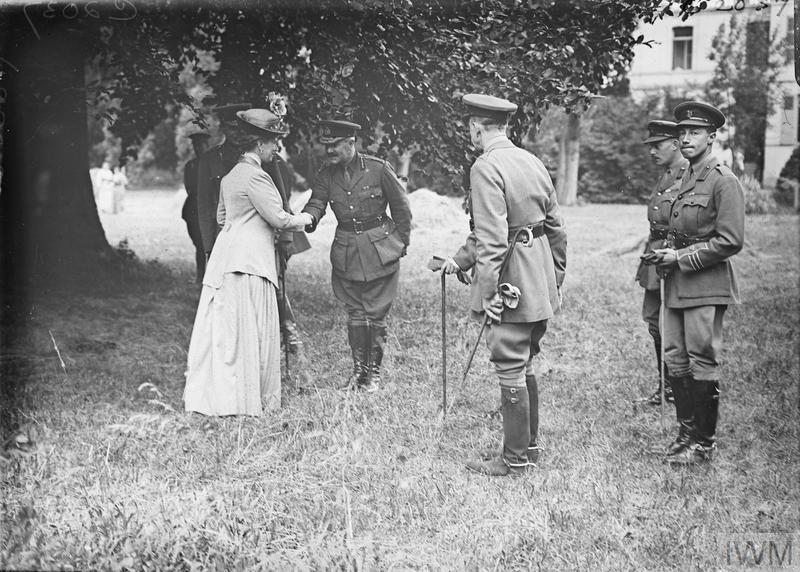
Brigadier-General John Charteris being presented to Queen Mary of Teck at Blendecques, July 1917. To his left, back facing towards the camera, is Lieutenant General Kiggell, Haig's CGS.

He served in the First World War as director of military training at the War Office from 1914, and as director of home defence at the War Office from later that year until 1915. He was promoted to major general in October 1914.

He served briefly as deputy chief of the Imperial General Staff at the end of 1915.

When General Sir Douglas Haig was promoted to commander-in-chief of the British Expeditionary Force (BEF) in December 1915, Kiggell was appointed chief of the general staff (CGS) of the BEF, which saw him raised to the temporary rank of lieutenant general while serving in this position. Richard Butler, Haig's preferred choice, was considered too junior for the role "and so, on Lord Horatio Kitchener's recommendation, the job went to Kiggell". In Haig words on his new CGS:

I have the greatest confidence in him as a soldier also as a gentleman.

Kiggell held this position for over two years until early 1918. Kiggell was made Knight Companion of the Order of the Bath (KCB) in 1916. On 1 January 1917, he was promoted to substantive lieutenant general. Sir Henry Wilson, liaising with French Grand Quartier Général early in 1917, claimed that Kiggell "hated the French".

Nigel Cave exonerates Kiggell from some of the questionable decisions that have been attributed to him. Kiggell's stress on high-morale infantry attacks cannot be blamed for the catastrophe which befell General Sir Henry Rawlinson's Fourth Army on the first day of the Battle of the Somme on 1 July 1916, as an infantry advance in straight lines was only one of the formations suggested in Rawlinson's Fourth Army Tactical Notes and modern research has shown that it was not widely adopted.

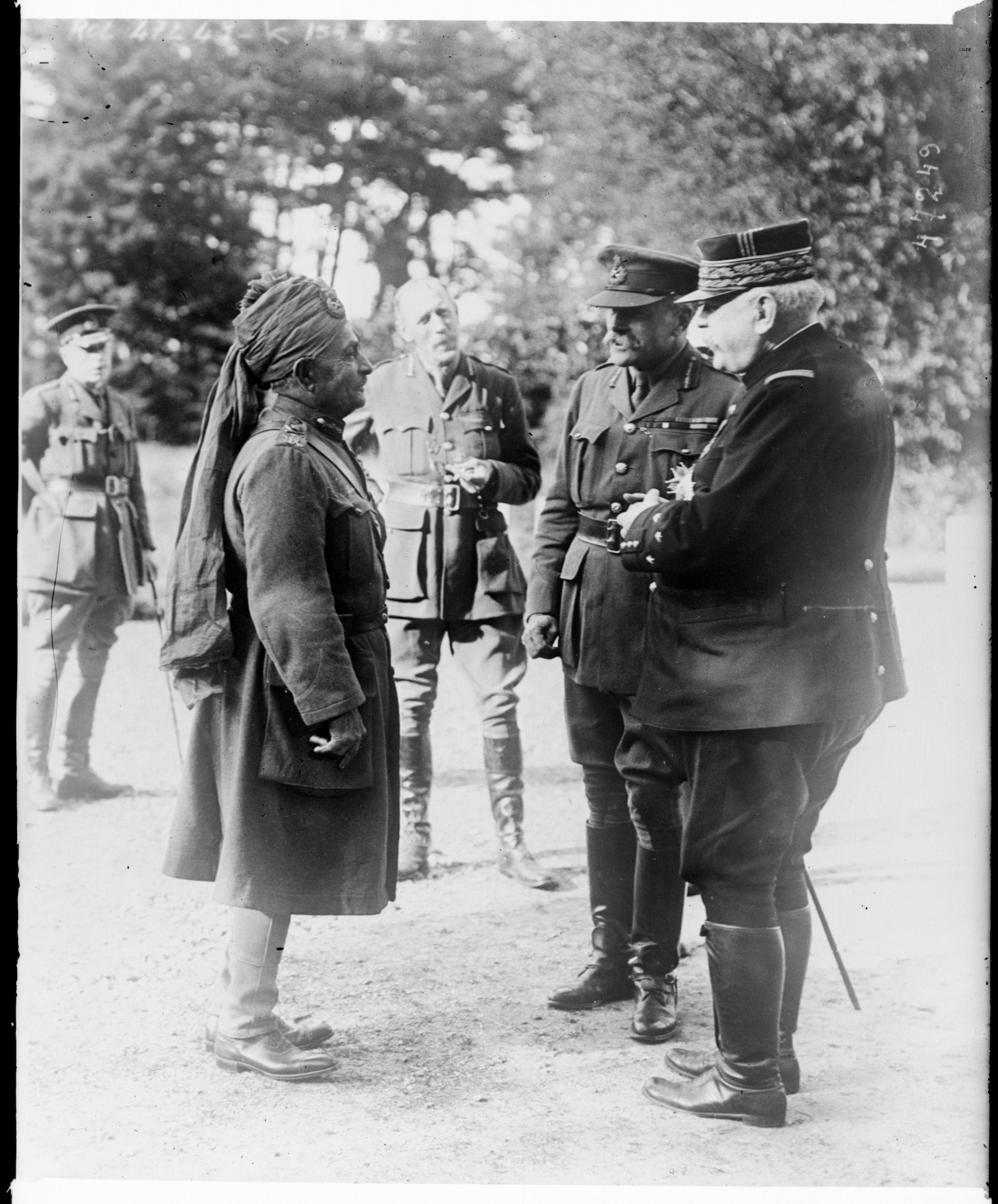
World War I Daily Mail Official War Photograph, Series VII, No. 49, titled "Sir D Haig introducing Sir Pertab Singh to General Joffre". The obverse carries the following information: "Passed by Censor" and ""I hope the time is soon coming when at the head of my men I shall die fighting." So says our grand old man of India, Lieutenant-General Sir Pertab Singh." Standing in the middle appears to be Lieutenant General Kiggell, Haig's CGS.

The decision to prolong the Battle of Passchendaele (also known as Third Ypres) into the wet weather of November 1917 (to capture the high ground of Passchendaele Ridge) and to postpone the initially more successful Cambrai offensive from 20 September until November, were ultimately taken by Haig rather than by Kiggell. Nigel Cave writes that Haig was highly critical of what he perceived as unsatisfactory performance, even in such senior generals as Rawlinson (in 1915) and the Second Army commander, General Sir Herbert Plumer (in 1916), and that it is unlikely that he would have retained Kiggell's services had he not been up to the job. Cave writes that Kiggell was "a solid effective administrator" and "basically sound and capable" but that "it is questionable whether he should have been allowed to carry on for so long". He is quoted, on seeing a flooded trench, as saying "Why wasn't I told it was like this". Contemporary evidence demonstrates that Kiggell was kept fully briefed on the conditions in the front line: this included the delivery of a 'violent report' on the 'awful conditions' by Major Edmund Osborne, 34th Division.

Along with a number of other senior officers at the BEF's general headquarters in the winter of 1917–18, including Butler and John Charteris, Kiggell was removed from his position, as a result of political pressure from Prime Minister David Lloyd George, and replaced by Major General Sir Herbert Lawrence, with whom he had been at Sandhurst. He was a scapegoat following the failure of Allied forces to achieve a decisive result at Passchendaele and the German counterattack which retook almost all the British gains at Cambrai. He had not taken the leave which he was due, and two doctors testified that he was suffering from nervous exhaustion.

== Later life ==
Kiggell was appointed a Knight Commander of the Order of St Michael and St George in January 1918. He was Lieutenant Governor of Guernsey from 1918 until 1920, in which year he retired from the Army. In December 1921 he became colonel of the Royal Warwickshire Regiment, into which he had been commissioned almost forty years earlier.

Kiggell worked on the Official History of the Great War from 1920 to 1923, but had to give up the task on health grounds. In 1924 he was appointed to write the volume of the Official History covering January 1918 to 21 March 1918, the period up until and including the first day of Operation Michael. As the blame for this near-debacle was politically controversial, it was planned to produce this volume quickly, like the volume on Gallipoli. British Army record-keeping had broken down during the chaotic days of the German breakthrough, so Kiggell was deemed an ideal person to interview officers who had served at the time, but in 1926 he was dismissed as he had made little progress, and what he had written was deemed “colourless”. As Cecil Aspinall-Oglander was busy writing the Gallipoli volume, James Edward Edmonds took over writing the volume himself; which in the event was not published until 1935 as he was busy with the Somme volume.

Kiggell had married Eleanor Rose Field, daughter of a colonel, on 10 March 1888. They had three sons, born in 1890, 1894 and 1903. His wife died in 1948. Kiggell died, after a thirty-year retirement, at Felixstowe on 23 February 1954. His estate was valued for probate at £2,286 1s 3d (just over £56,000 at 2016 prices).

== Bibliography ==
- Jeffery, Keith (2006). Field Marshal Sir Henry Wilson: A Political Soldier. Oxford University Press. ISBN 978-0-19-820358-2.
- Matthew, Colin (2004). Dictionary of National Biography. Vol. 32. Oxford: Oxford University Press. ISBN 978-0198614111., essay on Kiggell written by Nigel Cave.
- Wells, N. J. (2011). Official Histories of the Great War 1914–1918. Uckfield: Naval & Military Press. ISBN 978-1-84574-906-4.
- Zabecki, David T. (2008). Chief of Staff: Napoleonic wars to World War I. Naval Institute Press. ISBN 978-1591149903.

Military offices
Preceded by William Robertson	Commandant of the Staff College, Camberley; 1913–1914	Succeeded by College closed during the War (Post next held by Hastings Anderson)
Preceded by Sir Archibald Murray	Deputy Chief of the Imperial General Staff; November 1915 – December 1915	Succeeded by Sir Robert Whigham
Government offices
Preceded by Sir Reginald Hart	Lieutenant Governor of Guernsey; 1918–1920	Succeeded by Sir John Capper
