= Cecil Aspinall-Oglander =

British military historian

Brigadier-General Cecil Aspinall-Oglander CB CMG DSO
- Aspinall in 1918
- Born: Cecil Faber Aspinall; 8 February 1878; Wrexham, Wales
- Died: 23 May 1959 (aged 81)
- Military career
- Allegiance: United Kingdom
- Branch: British Army
- Service years: 1898–1920
- Rank: Brigadier-General
- Conflicts: Third Ashanti Expedition; Second Boer War; North-West Frontier; First World War
- Awards: Companion of the Order of the Bath; Companion of the Order of St Michael and St George; Distinguished Service Order; Mentioned in Despatches (10); Knight of the Legion of Honour (France); Knight Commander of the Order of the White Elephant (Siam)
- Other work: Historian

Brigadier-General Cecil Faber Aspinall-Oglander, CB, CMG, DSO (8 February 1878 – 23 May 1959) was a British Army officer and military historian, noted for his works on the First World War.

== Early life ==
Cecil Faber Aspinall was born in Wrexham, Wales, on 8 February 1878, the eldest son of Henry Edmund Aspinall and Kate née Williams. He received his formal education at the Isle of Wight College, and Rugby School.

== Military career ==
Aspinall was commissioned as a second lieutenant in the 4th Volunteer Battalion, East Surrey Regiment, on 12 January 1898, and was promoted to lieutenant before transferring to the 7th (Royal South Middlesex Militia) Battalion, Royal Fusiliers on 19 April 1900. Although the 7th Royal Fusiliers had not yet been embodied for full-time service (it served in home defence during the Second Boer War), Aspinall was immediately seconded for service in West Africa. He served with the West African Frontier Force in the Third Ashanti Expedition and was mentioned in Colonel James Willcocks' despatch for his good work during an attack on the fortified village of Obassa during the fierce fighting on 30 September that effectively ended the campaign.

After the Ashanti campaign, Aspinall was granted a regular commission as a second lieutenant in the Royal Munster Fusiliers (RMF) backdated to April 1900 but did not join the regiment until October 1900. He was seconded for service with the Army Service Corps in the Second Boer War, and served with it in operations in Cape Colony from August to December 1901 and in Orange River Colony from February to May 1902. He was promoted to lieutenant in the RMF on 6 February 1902.

Aspinall was promoted to captain on 2 August 1908 and having passed the Staff College, Camberley, he served as a staff captain and General Staff Officer Grade 3 (GSO3) at Army Headquarters in India for four years from 26 January 1909. From 1 October 1913 he was at the War Office in London as a GSO2.

== First World War ==
On the outbreak of the First World War, Aspinall was working as a GSO2 under the director of staff duties at the War Office.

In March 1915, he was informed that he would be joining the staff of General Sir Ian Hamilton's Mediterranean Expeditionary Force. He was one of Hamilton's most trusted aides during the Gallipoli campaign (1915–1916), where his actions saw him mentioned in despatches six times.

On 7 August 1916 he was appointed chief of staff (GSO1) of the 63rd (Royal Naval) Division, involved in the final phase of the Somme operations and the at Arras and Ypres in 1917.

On 18 November 1917, Aspinall moved up to be Brigadier-General General Staff of VIII Corps and remained in this role for the remainder of the war.

== Postwar and military retirement ==
Aspinall retired from the army in 1920 and was employed by the Historical Section of the British Committee of Imperial Defence, researching and writing the text of several volumes of the History of the Great War#GallipoliBritish Official History of the Gallipoli campaign.

Graham & Bidwell write that in 1924 Aspinall-Oglander, assisted by JFC Fuller, then a senior instructor at Camberley Staff College, published on behalf of the War Office “Volume II (Operations)”, which from the context appears to have been an extension of the recent republication of the prewar Field Service Regulations.

During the Second World War Aspinall-Oglander raised and commanded the 20th (East Wight) Battalion, Hampshire Home Guard.

== Death ==
Aspinall-Oglander died in his 81st year at Nunwell, on the Isle of Wight, on 23 April 1959. This location was long associated with the Oglander baronets. His second wife, Joan Oglander, came from a long line of descendants that had lived at Nunwell.

== Publications ==
- Aspinall-Oglander, Cecil Faber (1929). Military Operations Gallipoli: Inception of the Campaign to May 1915. History of the Great War Based on Official Documents by Direction of the Committee of Imperial Defence. Vol. I (1st ed.). London: William Heinemann. OCLC 464479053.
- Aspinall-Oglander, C. F. (1932). Military Operations Gallipoli: May 1915 to the Evacuation. History of the Great War Based on Official Documents by Direction of the Committee of Imperial Defence. Vol. II. London: William Heinemann. OCLC 278615923.
