= Naval & Military Press =

British speciality and history book and magazine publisher

- Status: Active
- Founded: 1991; 35 years ago
- Country of origin: United Kingdom
- Headquarters location: Uckfield, Sussex, England
- Distribution: Self-distributed (UK)
- Key people: Chris Buckland
- Publication types: Books, CD-ROMs
- Nonfiction topics: Military history, naval and maritime history, aviation, local history, family history, collectables and antiques, nostalgia and railway

The Naval and Military Press, also stylised as Naval & Military Press, is a British publisher which specialises in printing and distributing books in both hardback and softback on military history, militaria and other niche subjects, primarily focused on the United Kingdom.

== Operations ==
=== Publishing of printed books ===
In many instances, it republishes books that have been long out of print. Its founder would seek these out, and issue 'affordable new editions, putting unusual, unfamiliar and long sought for texts within the grasp, and the budget, of students of conflict around the world, both amateur and professional.' It has partnered with the Imperial War Museum to republish official histories. As of 2008 it had 2000 titles in print.

In addition to military titles, it has its imprint, Rediscovery Books. In partnership with the Royal Geographical Society there are print runs of books covering 'epic journeys and expeditions form the golden age of exploration in the Victorian era.'

=== Digital publication ===
Several years after the launch of the company, it started digital publishing. In collaboration with the Imperial War Museum, it published trench maps in 2000 and 2008. It has created and sold databases, made available in CD-ROM format, that are of interest to researchers of British military genealogy. It commenced with the digitisation of the Soldiers who Died in the Great War publication from 1921. Subsequent projects would result in the digitisation of record sets held in the archives of The National Archives (United Kingdom), at the time of the First World War centenary period. The rolls of recipients of the Silver War Badge were similarly transcribed. The same was done with the WW1 campaign medal rolls of the War Office. Plans to digitise the war diaries of the western front were announced in early 2014. The war diaries became available in printed format in 2016. It is now possible to access these online via a subscription service. It provides a low cost offering for online genealogy, comparable to those brands of GenesReunited and ForcesWarRecords of Findmypast and Ancestry.com respectively. Several of these datasets are licensed to Findmypast.

=== Bookseller ===
As well as a publishing house, it also operates as an online vendor of books. In addition to its own reprints, it also sells the newly published books from its contemporary Pen and Sword Books, and other publishers. As of December 2023, they had 'Over 7000 military books available online.' As a bookseller, they are seen as offering an extensive range, that is competitively priced. The despatched items are well packaged, but there are occasional delays.
