= Committee of Imperial Defence =

UK government committee (1904–1939)

The Committee of Imperial Defence was an important ad hoc part of the Government of the United Kingdom and the British Empire from just after the Second Boer War until the start of the Second World War. It was responsible for research, and some co-ordination, on issues of military strategy.

Typically, a temporary sub-committee would be set up to investigate and report at length on a specific topic. Many such sub-committees were engendered over the decades, on topics such as foreign espionage (a committee report in 1909 led to the founding of MI5 and MI6), food rationing, and aerial defence. It is possible to argue that the Committee of Imperial Defence was an important step in the development of national security coordination in the UK, and to see the current National Security Council as one of its descendants.

== History ==
The committee was established in 1902 by Arthur Balfour, then British Prime Minister, following the recommendations of St John Brodrick and Lord Selborne, respectively Secretary of State for War and First Lord of the Admiralty. In 1904, on the recommendation of the Esher Committee, it was given a secretariat.

The original concept was to create a strategic vision defining the future roles of the two military services, the Royal Navy and the British Army, after the military reductions in the wake of the Boer War. However, no arrangements were made for it to formally pass on its conclusions to those with the ability to translate them into actions. This lack soon became obvious enough that a Secretariat was appointed, under Sir George Clarke. In addition to acting as a communicator, Clarke was tasked with making sure that the policies agreed to by the committee were implemented. With the fall of the Balfour Government in December 1905, and with the military services determined to control their own futures, these plans fell through, and with no support from the incoming Prime Minister, he resigned in 1907.

A small Secretariat became permanent and provided communication between members outside of Committee meetings, and with other civil servants.

Under the guidance of Maurice Hankey, the Committee slowly gained in importance. Hankey was appointed Naval Assistant Secretary to the Committee in 1908, and became Secretary to the Committee in 1912; he would hold that position for the next twenty-six years.

By 1914, the Committee had begun to act as a defence planning agency for the whole British Empire, consequently providing advice to the Dominions on occasion. It continued to perform such a role into the 1920s. It was effectively a peacetime defence planning system, one which only provided advice; formal authority remained with Ministers and service chiefs, which helped ensure the Committee's acceptability to the existing bureaucracy.

Chaired by the Prime Minister, members were usually cabinet ministers, the heads of the military services, and key civil servants; Prime Ministers from Dominion countries were de facto members of the Committee in peacetime as well.

The Committee became the Defence Committee in 1947.

Professional heads of the English/British Armed Forces
| | Royal Navy | British Army | Royal Air Force | Combined |
|---|---|---|---|---|
| 1645 | N/A | Commander-in-Chief of the Forces (1645/60–1904, intermittently) | Not established | |
| 1689 | Senior Naval Lord (1689–1771) | Commander-in-Chief of the Forces (1645/60–1904, intermittently) | Not established | |
| 1771 | First Naval Lord (1771–1904) | Commander-in-Chief of the Forces (1645/60–1904, intermittently) | Not established | |
| 1904 | First Sea Lord (1904–1917) | Chief of the General Staff (1904–1909) | Not established | Inter-service co-ordination was carried out from 1904 by the Committee of Imperial Defence under the chairmanship of the Prime Minister |
| 1909 | First Sea Lord (1904–1917) | Chief of the Imperial General Staff (1909–1964) | Not established | Inter-service co-ordination was carried out from 1904 by the Committee of Imperial Defence under the chairmanship of the Prime Minister |
| 1917 | First Sea Lord and Chief of the Naval Staff (1917–present) | Chief of the Imperial General Staff (1909–1964) | Not established | Inter-service co-ordination was carried out from 1904 by the Committee of Imperial Defence under the chairmanship of the Prime Minister |
| 1918 | First Sea Lord and Chief of the Naval Staff (1917–present) | Chief of the Imperial General Staff (1909–1964) | Chief of the Air Staff (1918–present) | Inter-service co-ordination was carried out from 1904 by the Committee of Imperial Defence under the chairmanship of the Prime Minister |
| 1923 | First Sea Lord and Chief of the Naval Staff (1917–present) | Chief of the Imperial General Staff (1909–1964) | Chief of the Air Staff (1918–present) | Chairman of the Chiefs of Staff Committee (1923–1959, held by one of the service heads until 1956) |
| 1959 | First Sea Lord and Chief of the Naval Staff (1917–present) | Chief of the Imperial General Staff (1909–1964) | Chief of the Air Staff (1918–present) | Chief of the Defence Staff (1959–present) |
| 1964 | First Sea Lord and Chief of the Naval Staff (1917–present) | Chief of the General Staff (1964–present) | Chief of the Air Staff (1918–present) | Chief of the Defence Staff (1959–present) |

== See also ==
- Imperial War Cabinet
- Imperial Defence College
- Joint Intelligence Committee (United Kingdom), a sub-committee of the CID
- National Security Council (United Kingdom)
