= The Temple (painting) =

1949 painting by Paul Delvaux

- Artist: Paul Delvaux
- Year: 1949
- Medium: Oil on canvas
- Dimensions: 113.7 cm × 146 cm (44.8 in × 57 in)
- Location: Private collection

The Temple (French: Le Temple) is an oil on canvas painting by the Belgian artist Paul Delvaux, from 1949. It depicts a classical temple building in moonlight, with the head of a statue and several modern objects in the foreground. The painting was made in Choisel, outside Paris, where Delvaux lived temporarily with his lover and future wife Anne-Marie "Tam" de Maertelaere.

The Temple's combination of classical elements and modern objects was inspired by the works of the Italian painter Giorgio de Chirico. Critics have discussed how the anachronism creates a connection between the past and present, the significance of the intact temple, and how the painting evokes beauty and poetry. The painting is in a private collection and was last sold at auction in 2012.

== Background ==
The Belgian painter Paul Delvaux made The Temple during a period when his paintings sold poorly and his private life had become complicated. His marriage had failed and in 1947 he had again met Anne-Marie "Tam" de Maertelaere, a woman he had fallen in love with already in 1928, and the two became lovers. Delvaux's art dealer Claude Spaak offered to let Delvaux and Tam stay at a house Spaak owned in Choisel, a municipality outside of Paris, which Delvaux accepted after some hesitation. The couple stayed in Choisel from December 1948 to the end of July 1949. In addition to The Temple, Delvaux's more prominent paintings from this period include Woman at the Temple, The Annunciation and Ecce Homo. Delvaux and Tam eventually married.

== Subject and composition ==
The Temple is painted in oil and has the dimensions 113.7 cm × 146 cm (44.8 in × 57.5 in). At the bottom right, it is signed and dated "P.Delvaux Choisel 3-49". It depicts a classical temple building seen from the front in moonlight. The intact temple has a frieze and pediment decorated with sculptures. Its cella—the inner temple room—is lit up and features a large female cult statue at the back.

In the foreground is a wooden crate. On top of it, to the left, is a sculpted woman's head, wearing a tiara and a bridal veil. The head is broken off at the neck and there is a brooch pin close to it. To the right on top of the box is a burning modern oil lamp. Nearby is a purple bow with three hatpins. In the background is the sea, illuminated by light from the Moon.

== Analysis and reception ==
Many of Delvaux's most famous paintings were made in the late 1940s and they often combine depictions of women with classical architecture, creating an irrational encounter between classical antiquity and the modern world. Important influences here include the painter Giorgio de Chirico's evocations of his childhood in Greece and the ancient Mediterranean region, and the Surrealist celebration of the chance encounter between unrelated objects. According to the art historian Adrienne Dumas, the combination of classical fragments and modern objects in The Temple is reminiscent of Chirico's Le Rêve Transformé (1913) and The Song of Love (1914). Dumas writes that The Temple is similar to many Chirico paintings in how it portrays a "strange or disjunctive antiquity", which creates a sense of crisis in a disjointed contemporary world, and simultaneously evokes "lyrical mystery and enduring power" that connect the past and the present. The philosopher Marcel Paquet highlighted the deliberate anachronism in The Temple and compared it to the rejection of "empirical vision" in Cubism. He wrote that the way Pablo Picasso "transcends the space-plane" is similar to how Delvaux "transcends the linearity of history".

Oil lamps are a recurring motif in Delvaux's paintings. In addition to The Temple, they appear in an ancient setting in The Lamps (1937), outside an abandoned train station in Horizons (1960), paving a walkway in All the Lights (1962), and carried by women in The Cortege (1963), The Acropolis (1966) and Chrysis (1967). Delvaux said they were part of his original break with rationalism: "When I dared paint a Roman triumphal arch with, on the ground, lighted lamps, the decisive step had been taken. ... Painting could, I realised, have a meaning of its own, it confirmed in a very special way its capacity to play a major emotional role." The art historian and archaeologist Philippe Jockey writes that The Temple, like Delvaux's paintings in general, has no direct message to decipher, but it does have a "network of signifiers" associated with classical sculpture. He highlights the absence of melancholy and longing for the past in The Temple. The building, its decorations and cult statue are intact; although the head in the foreground has been broken off from the body, Jockey writes that "it lives from the brilliance of its intact colours". According to Jockey, this is significant because it contrasts with an earlier painting by Delvaux, The Ruined Palace (1935), which shows a toppled and damaged female statue surrounded by stone fragments.

The art critic Xavier Marret used The Temple as an example of how Delvaux created dreamlike and anxious environments by engaging viewers in thoughts as they look at the painting's setting, metallic blue sky, moonlight and image composition. The art historian René Passeron called it "one of the most powerful of Delvaux's nocturnal visions". The art historian Virginie Devillers likens the crate to an altar and writes that the painting expresses the "pure beauty", "enchantment" and "event" of light, especially moonlight. She writes that it uses juxtaposition to turn familiar objects into matters of poetry and to connect them to the temple, a "monumental, absolute apparition".

== Provenance ==
The Temple was initially bought by the art collector Jean–Louis Merckx in Brussels. It was next sold through the Sidney Janis Gallery in New York, which exhibited it in June 1951. By 1969, it had been sold to Mrs Robiliart in Brussels, and after that a private collector in Geneva. From 1990 to 2004 it was owned by the Gallery Ueda in Tokyo. A private collector who purchased it from the Gallery Ueda sold it through Christie's on 20 June 2012 for 1,609,250 pounds sterling. It has been part of Delvaux retrospective exhibitions held at Ostend's Museum of Fine Arts in 1962, Brussels' Museum of Ixelles in 1967, Paris' Musée des Arts décoratifs in 1969 and Rotterdam's Museum Boijmans Van Beuningen in 1973.
