= George Papanicolaou =

George Papanicolaou or Papanikolaou may refer to:

- Georgios Papanikolaou (1883–1962), Greek pathologist
- George C. Papanicolaou (born 1943), American mathematician
- Giorgos Papanikolaou (born 1977), Greek politician, Member of the European Parliament
- Gabriel Papanicolaou (born Georgios Papanikolaou in 1976), Greek Orthodox metropolitan bishop of Nea Ionia and Philadelphia; see Church of Greece

== See also ==
- Papanicolaou or Papanikolaou, a surname
