= Hebdomeros =

1929 book by Giorgio De Chirico

- Cover of the first edition
- Author: Giorgio de Chirico
- Language: French
- Publisher: Éditions du Carrefour
- Publication date: 1929
- Publication place: France
- English publication date: 1966

Hebdomeros is a 1929 book (referred to by some as a novel) by Italian painter Giorgio de Chirico. Chirico did not produce any other long-form writing. The book is narrated in the third person and loosely concerns the movement of a man, Hebdomeros, westward. Writing in The Kenyon Review, Alan Burns referred to the text as a "surrealist dream novel".

== Context and publication ==
At the beginning of his career, Chirico produced works in a style he developed with his fellow Italian painter Carlo Carrà. They referred to the style as pittura metafisica or metaphysical art. In the early 1920s, the French poet and writer André Breton (around whom the surrealist movement organized itself) noticed and became enthralled by a "metaphysical" painting of Chirico's at the gallery of Paul Guillaume. Due to admiration from Breton and other surrealists, Chirico became an accepted member of their social and artistic group in Paris. Later in the 1920s, other surrealists became increasingly critical of Chirico's new work, and he split from the other artists.

Despite Chirico's split with the group, critics generally refer to Hebdomeros as belonging to the body of surrealist writing. Peer artists who both painted and wrote include Max Ernst. Though Chirico did not write another full book, he did write poetry.

== Reception ==
Writing in Books Abroad, Hélène Harvitt referred to the book as "hard to read", blaming both its indistinct plot and the "typographical aspect" of few paragraph breaks and no divisions into chapters. Despite her reservations, she wrote that readers with "patience" would find "much poetry and food for thought." The American writer Thomas Pynchon refers to Hebdomeros as a "dream novel" in his own debut novel, V.
