= The Enigma of the Hour =

Painting by Giorgio de Chirico

- Artist: Giorgio de Chirico
- Year: 1910–1911
- Medium: Oil on canvas
- Dimensions: 54.6 cm × 71.1 cm (21 1/2 in × 28 in)
- Location: Private collection

The Enigma of the Hour is an oil on canvas painting by the Italian metaphysical painter Giorgio de Chirico. He created the work during his early period, in Florence, when he focused on metaphysical depictions of town squares and other urban environments. It is not clear whether it was created in 1910 or 1911.

== Description ==
The Enigma depicts an urban scene with the classical architecture and angular lighting that are Chirico's hallmarks. Several figures around the scene have vague features, to give the sense that they are absent. Above the scene is a large clock that reads five minutes to three. Luca Cottini referred to the clock as "...[suggesting] the paradox of an 'eternal present,' located on the edge of a-temporal revelation and moving temporality, and [enacting] the enigma of its nature." Peter G. Toohey has asserted the figure in white represents Odysseus.

Art historian Paolo Baldacci described The Enigma of the Hour as "the very first conceptual artwork in the history of art", arguing that de Chirico sought to translate "a thought or philosophical concept into the forms of the plastic arts" rather than to render visible reality or express an emotional state through abstract form and color.
