= Giorgio de Chirico: Argonaut of the Soul =

- Film poster
- Greek: Τζιόρτζιο ντε Κίρικο – Αργοναύτης της ψυχής
- Directed by: Giorgos Lagdaris; Kostas Anestis
- Written by: Giorgos Lagdaris; Kostas Anestis
- Produced by: Giorgos Lagdaris
- Narrated by: Giorgos Bakiris; Spyros Mavides; Despoina Tsouka
- Cinematography: Dimitris Kordelas; Kostas Karpidas
- Edited by: Athanasia Xafara
- Music by: Evangelia Kikou
- Production companies: EKPOL (ΕΚΠΟΛ); Lagdaris Production
- Distributed by: Lagdaris Production
- Release date: 2010
- Running time: 42 minutes
- Country: Greece
- Language: Greek

Giorgio de Chirico: Argonaut of the Soul (Greek: Giorgio de Chirico – Αργοναύτης της ψυχής, romanized: Argonáftis tis psychís; or Τζιόρτζιο ντε Κίρικο – Αργοναύτης της ψυχής) is a 2010 documentary film produced by EKPOL (Social Intervention and Culture Company of the Prefecture of Magnesia), co-written and directed by Giorgos Lagdaris and Kostas Anestis. The film attempts to poetically approach the mysterious characteristic of the paintings of Giorgio de Chirico.

== Synopsis ==
Through archival material, the documentary unfolds the artist's life and work from his birth in Volos until his death in Rome. De Chirico's relationship with his birthplace is highlighted and how his first experiences in Volos influenced his later artistic production and his artistic worldview, with the enigma at the centre of his quests. The documentary features distinguished art historians, critics and writers talking about his personality and work, such as Niki Loizidi, Nikos Daskalothanasis, Miltiadis Papanikolaou, Gerd Roos, Kostas Androulidakis, Militsa Karathanou, Kostas Komninos.

== Cast ==
- Niki Loizidi as herself (art historian)
- Miltiadis Papanikolaou as himself (art historian)
- Kostas Androulidakis as himself (researcher, writer)
- Gerd Roos as himself (art historian)
- Nikos Daskalothanasis as himself (art historian; credited as Christos Daskalothanasis)
- Militsa Karathanou as herself (writer)
- Konstantinos Hronopoulos as Little Giorgio
- Kostas Komninos as the Painter (De Chirico)
- Hristos Giannakopoulos as the Teacher (Kostas Mavroidis)

== Production ==
The shooting of the film took place in Volos, Pelion, Athens, Nafplio and Rome, in 2008.
