= Gare Montparnasse (The Melancholy of Departure) =

1914 painting by Giorgio de Chirico

- Artist: Giorgio de Chirico
- Year: 1914
- Catalogue: 80538
- Medium: Oil on canvas
- Dimensions: 140 cm × 184.5 cm (55 1/8 in × 72 7/8 in)
- Location: Museum of Modern Art; New York
- Accession: 1077.1969

Gare Montparnasse (The Melancholy of Departure) (Italian: La stazione di Montparnasse) is an oil on canvas painting by the Italian metaphysical painter Giorgio de Chirico, from 1914. It is held at the Museum of Modern Art, in New York.

== History and description ==
Many of de Chirico's works were inspired by the introspective feelings evoked by travel. He was born in Greece to Italian parents. This work was painted during a period when he lived in Paris.

The painting depicts the Gare Montparnasse railway station in Paris, France. It is a classic example of de Chirico's style, depicting an angular perspective on an outdoor architectural setting in the long shadows and deep colours of early evening. On the horizon is a steam train with a plume of white smoke billowing away from it. The train image appears several times in de Chirico's work. In the foreground is a bunch of bananas, another recurring image in de Chirico's work (cf. The Transformed Dream).

In 1916, de Chirico painted another work simply titled The Melancholy of Departure.

== Sources ==
- Museum of Modern Art
