= The Melancholy of Departure =

1916 painting by Giorgio de Chirico

- Melanconia della partenza (Italian)
- Artist: Giorgio de Chirico
- Year: 1916
- Medium: Oil on canvas
- Dimensions: 68.2 cm × 52.4 cm (26.9 in × 20.6 in)
- Location: Tate Modern, London

The Melancholy of Departure (Italian: Melanconia della partenza) is an oil on canvas painting by the Italian metaphysical painter Giorgio de Chirico, from 1916. This painting was created after Chirico returned to Italy from Paris to join the Italian Army in World War I. It is held at the Tate Modern, in London.

== History and description ==
During this time Chirico was moving away from the bright open scenes of his previous work. He was now focusing on more abstract combinations of objects and indoor settings, and seeking to paint the hidden meanings behind the surface of things. The themes of travel and departure are present in much of Chirico's canon, as seen in his many paintings of trains and railways stations.

This painting depicts a random cluster of objects used to make paintings, and an easel which holds up a triangular map. The map shows a channel between two land masses with outlines of different routes. The surroundings are the inside of a room at night. The room has an open archway through which can be seen a tower.

This is the second painting by Chirico by this title after his 1914 work Gare Montparnasse (The Melancholy of Departure).

== Legacy ==
In 1987 the American jazz musicians Mark Isham and Art Lande released a song titled "The Melancholy of Departure" on their collaborative album We Begin.
