= Metaphysical Interior with Biscuits =

1916 painting by Giorgio de Chirico

- Interno metafisico con biscotti (Italian)
- Artist: Giorgio de Chirico
- Year: 1916
- Medium: Oil on canvas
- Dimensions: 81.3 cm × 65.1 cm (32 in × 25 5/8 in)
- Location: Menil Collection, Houston

Metaphysical Interior with Biscuits (Italian: Interno metafisico con biscotti) is a 1916 painting by Italian metaphysical painter Giorgio de Chirico. It is one of the earliest editions in a series of works that extended late into Chirico's career.

Like the others in this series, this painting depicts a room cluttered with objects in a surreal arrangement. In this case the main focus is a panel on which are mounted several biscuits (crackers) arranged to resemble an abstract face. Behind this panel is a picture in an irregularly shaped frame. The image in the frame is an architectural scene in the style of de Chirico's earlier work.
