= Ariadne (Giorgio de Chirico) =

1913 painting by Giorgio de Chirico

- Artist: Giorgio de Chirico
- Year: 1913
- Medium: Oil and graphite on canvas
- Dimensions: 135.3 cm × 180.3 cm (53.3 in × 71.0 in)
- Location: Metropolitan Museum of Art, New York

Ariadne is an oil and graphite on canvas 1913 painting by Italian painter Giorgio de Chirico, from 1913. It is held at the Metropolitan Museum of Art, in New York.

== Description and provenance ==
The painting depicts the mythical figure Ariadne as she lies sleeping in an empty public square; this is in reference to the myth that birthed the character, in which Ariadne is abandoned on Naxos by her lover Theseus. According to sources provided by the Metropolitan Museum of Art, this reflects Chirico's personal feelings of isolation after moving to Paris in 1911.

The painting was donated to the Metropolitan Museum of Art as part of the bequest of Florene Schoenborn in 1995.

== See also ==
- The Soothsayer's Recompense, another painting by Chirico that depicted Ariadne
