= Arnaldo dell'Ira =

Italian architect (1903–1943)

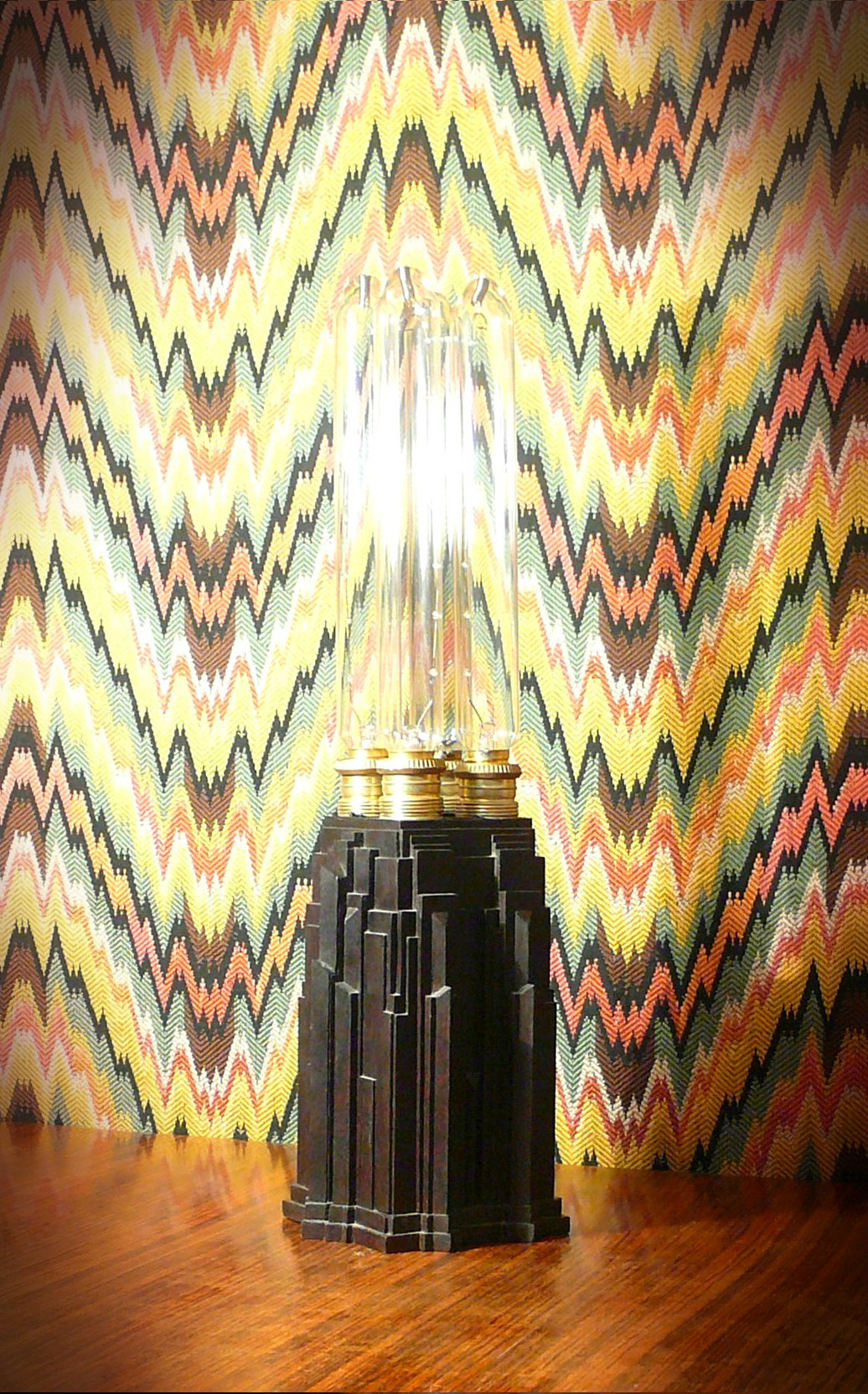
"Skyscraper Lamp" designed by Arnaldo dell'Ira, 1929

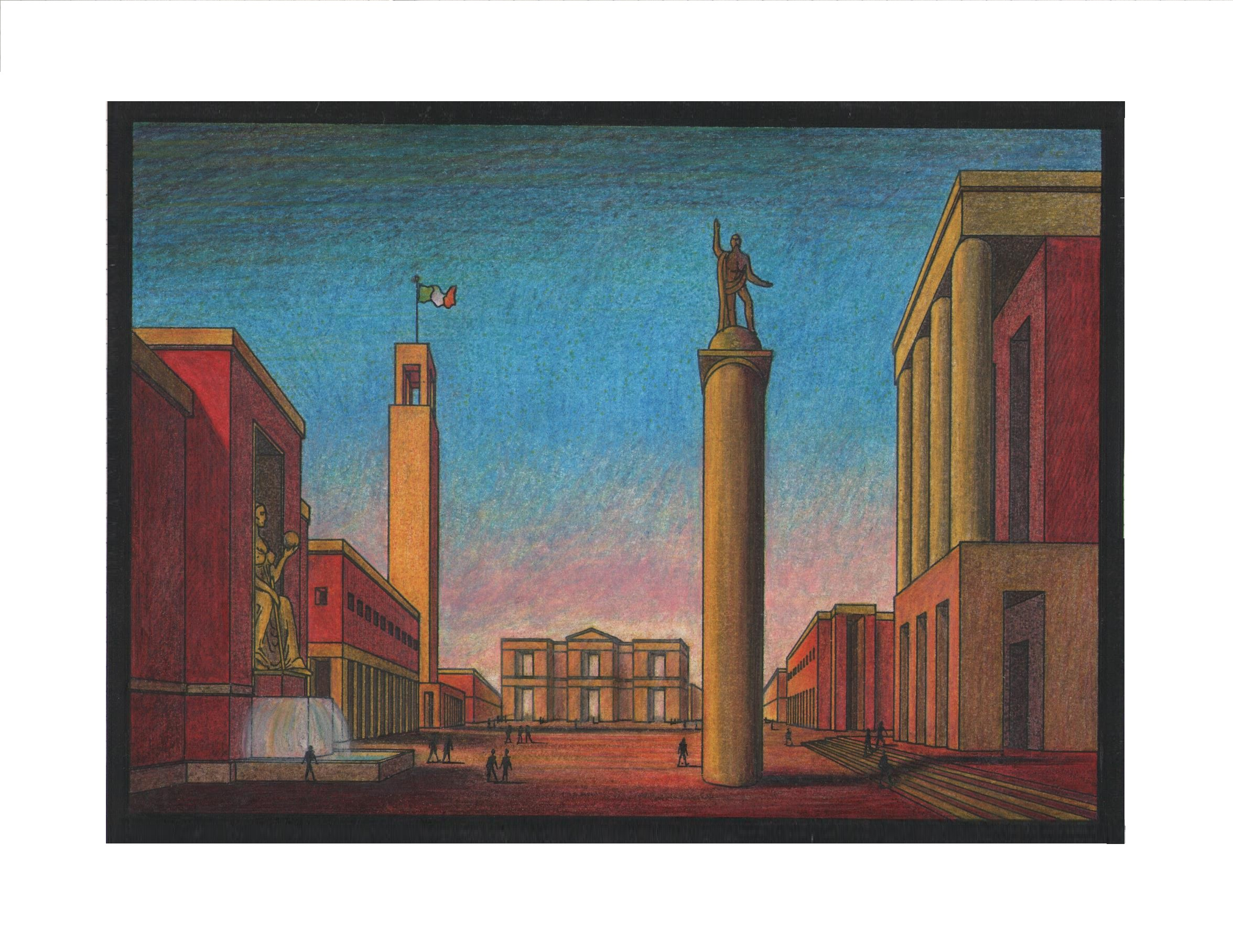
"Piazza d'Italia", 1934

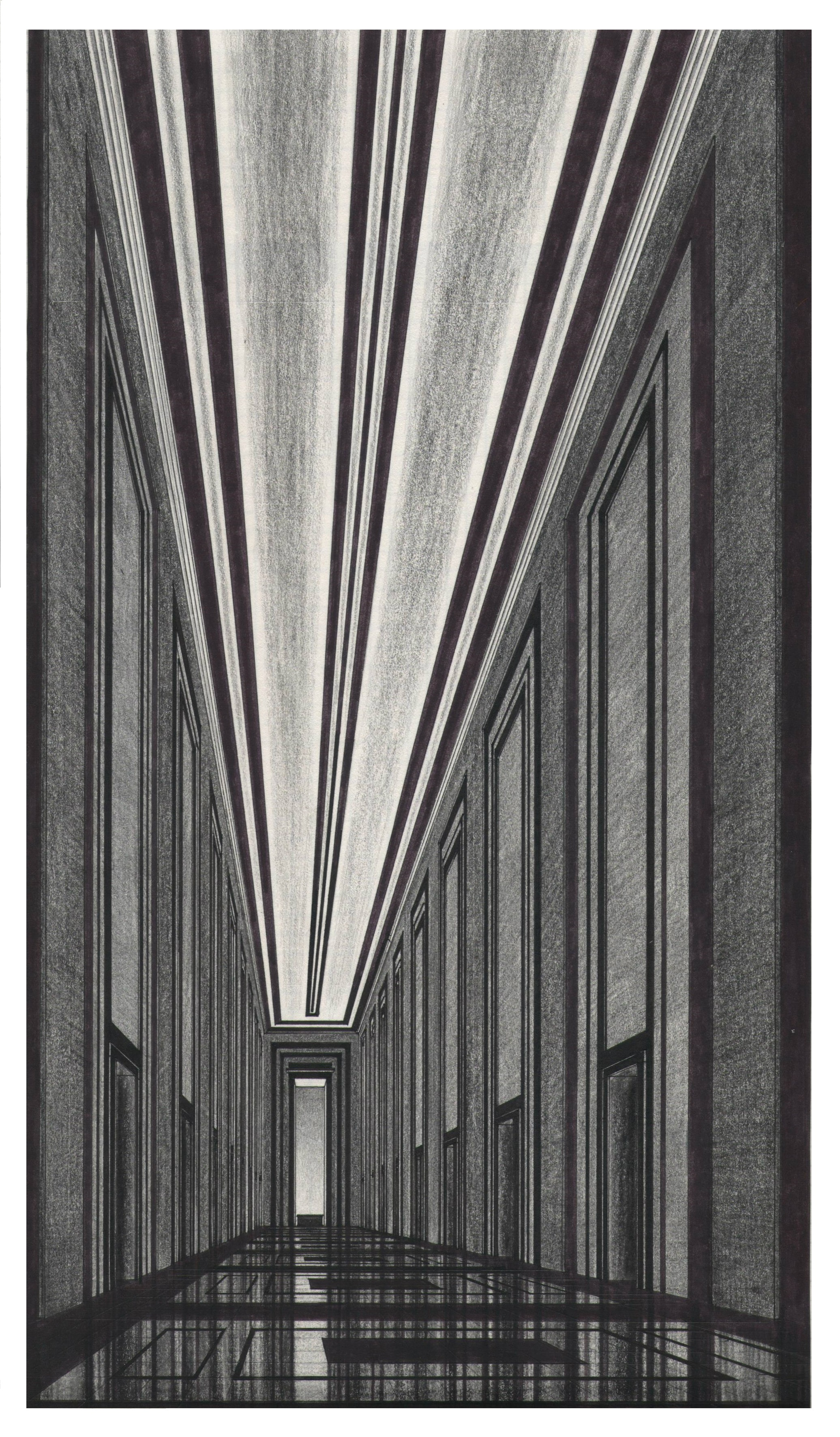
Hall for the Department of Communications, 1932

Arnaldo Dell'Ira (21 March 1903 – January 1943) was an Italian architect.

He was hired as a draftsman in the main architectural firms of his time, both in Rome and Florence, and with his work well represents the Italian architectural culture during the interwar period in all its components, reflecting the contrasting formal trends (first secessionists, futurists and Art Deco, later rationalists and classicists).

== Life ==
Dell'Ira was born in Livorno, in a family of liberal traditions that had long been committed to the politics of the young Italian unified State: his maternal grandfather – whose surname he adopted during his professional activity – had participated in the expedition of the Thousand in Sicily together with Giuseppe Garibaldi and his father, convinced interventionist in World War I, in that of Fiume (today Rijeka in Croatia) with Gabriele D'Annunzio. Having completed his classical studies at the Liceo Gymnasium in Livorno, he moved to Florence to attend the courses of architecture of the Academy of Fine Arts (the Royal Higher School of Architecture will be established in Florence only in 1926).

In the early 1920s, he strengthened relations of friendship and working with Giovanni Michelucci and the young architects who compose the Tuscan Group, later winner of the competition for the new railway station of Santa Maria Novella in Florence. The lively and elitist Florentine intellectual circles, defined by Dell'Ira in a letter (correspondence, 1927, Nr. 45) "a cage of crickets", however does not satisfy him, as he is convinced that only in Rome can be made modern architecture at the high level of the great Italian tradition.

In 1930 he moved, therefore, to the capital, and worked in the important studio of Angiolo Mazzoni, engineer of futurist formation and official of the dicastery of communications, author of numerous postal buildings and railway stations, now of traditional forms, now more markedly modern. With Mazzoni he had already collaborated on the construction site of the seaside Holiday Camp Rosa Maltoni Mussolini for the sons of postmen and railwaymen, located in Calambrone on the coast between Pisa and Livorno.

For his knowledge of the intellectual circles in Florence, Dell'Ira was instructed to follow the complex and politically sensitive project of the new Florentine railway station, for which the studio Mazzoni will elaborate eight different variants, of which the last (called 33c), with a clearer modern imprint, will be largely the result of the efforts of Dell'Ira. The result of the competition, which rewarded the project of the Tuscan Group, however, created a rift with Angiolo Mazzoni, and in 1933 Dell'Ira entered the studio of Marcello Piacentini, the most influential Italian architect in this time.

This began a period of professional activity, which saw him engaged in many construction sites of the capital (the Church of Sacro Cuore di Cristo Re, the administration building (Rettorato) of the Sapienza University, the Palace of Corporations), and his drawings and projects reflect this moment.

Between the powerful Marcello Piacentini and the young architect was established a personal and artistic understanding: "In the studio of Marcello the golden light of the Lungotevere illuminates the drawing tables and naturally guides the hand towards forms of austere beauty, forms of our time finally worthy of the tradition of Rome "(Correspondence, 1937, NR, 118).

With the full confidence of Piacentini, starting from 1936, Dell'Ira is the principal head of the studio for relations with the German architects, increasingly important with the change of the political climate. Dell'Ira was responsible for both the exhibition on contemporary architecture in German published in the magazine "Architecture" (1939), and the subsequent article of Piacentini on the new palace of the Italian Embassy in Berlin, a work of the German architect Friedrich Hetzelt.

This was the last professional engagement of Dell'Ira, who in 1942 left voluntarily with the 8th Army for the Russian front, where he would be lost in the battle on the Don River in January 1943. After the war the municipality of Livorno dedicated to his memory a short publication (Lando Bartoli, "Arnaldo Dell'Ira, un Italiano", Livorno 1948) that traces his human and professional story, representative of an era of Italian architecture.

== Works ==
Dell'Ira created an imposing corpus of drawings, about 250, executed using different techniques (charcoal sketches; drawings in China ink, shaded with watercolor or graphite; colored pastel, tempera or coloured inks) and of different formats (from the large perspective views, to the preparatory sketches, often very accurate and collected in notebooks distinguished by the color of the cover, up to the executive drawings).

== The Florentine period ==
His drawings of the 1920s are predominately interior design and architecture projects with evident influences of the Vienna Secession (decoration of the Cinema Lux) and later Art Deco (shop of Bandini fabrics; project of the bakelite lamp "Skyscraper", an early example of industrial design of which was executed a prototype in lacquered wood).

== The Roman period ==
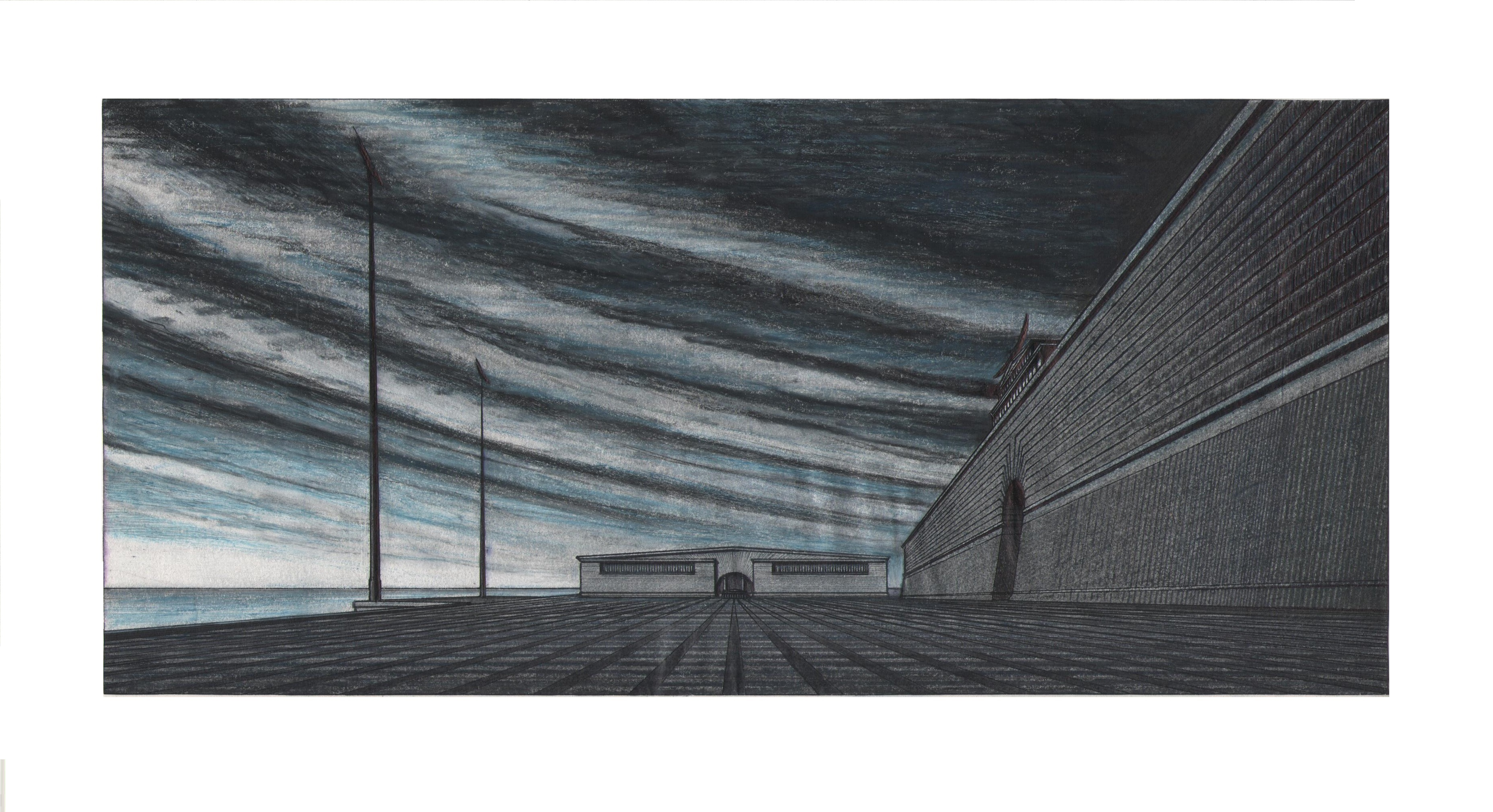
Square on the sea in Livorno, 1938

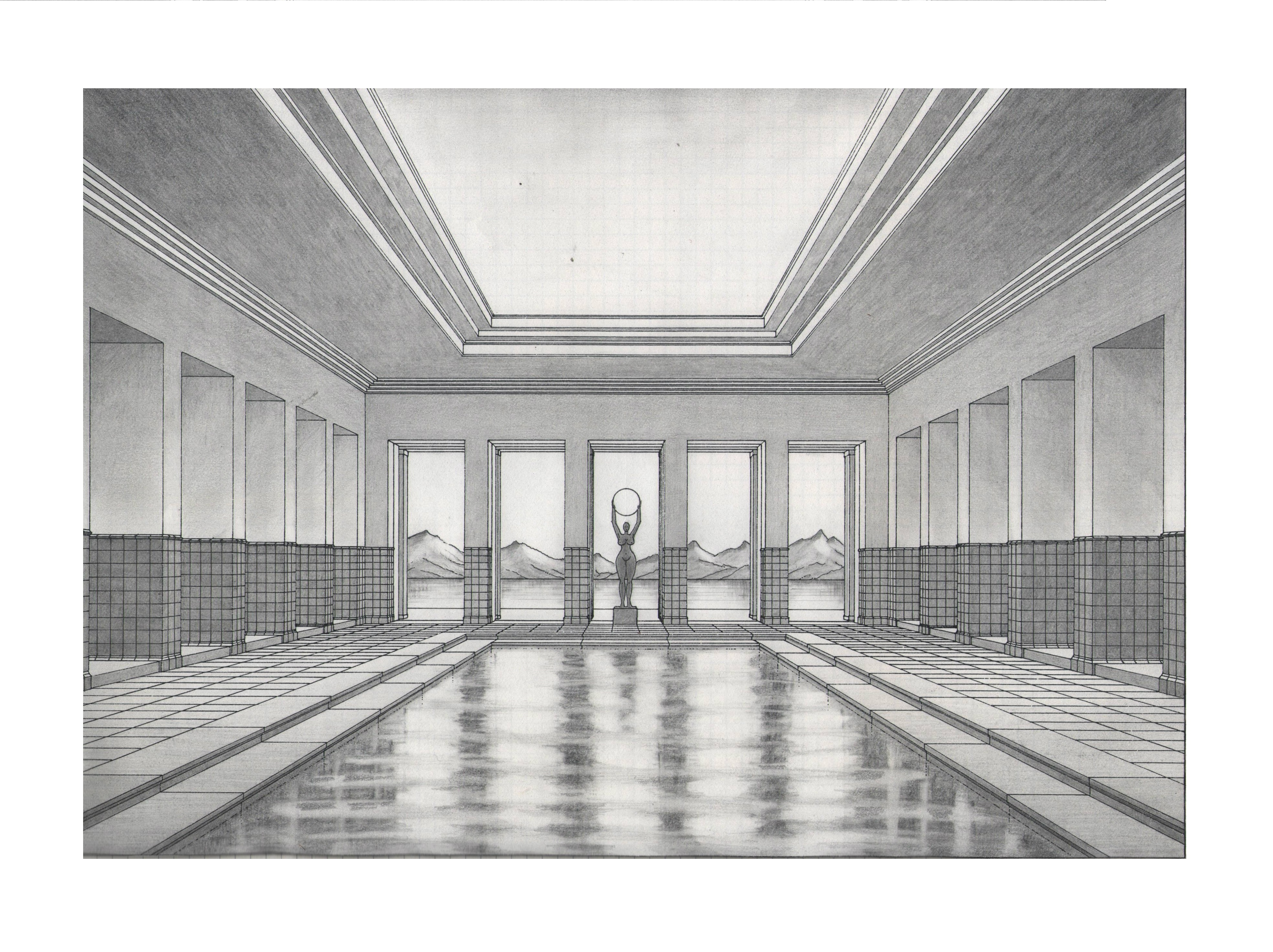
Pool on the Lake Garda. 1941

In the early years of the Roman period (1930–1936), in parallel with his activity in the studio of Mazzoni and then in the studio of Piacentini, Dell'Ira developed his personal style. He first abandoned the decorative repertory of Art Deco, increasingly felt as foreign to the Italian national character, and turned to a rationalism fraught with futuristic suggestions. He later embraced with enthusiasm the compromise between modernity and monumentality proposed by Marcello Piacentini.

This breakthrough is attested in the preserved drawings by a wide range of projects and architectural views, among the most representative of the collection: the series for the Department of Communications, aiming at the definition of a modern monumentality; the "Piazze d'Italia" (Italian Squares), where classical, vernacular and metaphysical suggestions are mixed; Several projects of small, but accurate utilitarian buildings (primary rural schools, recreational clubs, "Houses of Youth").

From this serene series of images diverge the views of a square on the sea to be realized in Livorno, perhaps within the framework of the plan developed by Marcello Piacentini. Like others dating back to the late 1930s and early '40s, these drawings have in fact a different character, the same one that can be found in contemporary letters of correspondence: the palette of colors goes out, the views are magnified in utopian visions, military buildings are prevailing (barracks, customs, monuments to the fallen united by the title "Guard at the Borders"). More and more evident is the influence of contemporary German architecture (especially Wilhelm Kreis and Albert Speer), together with that properly neoclassical by Pasquale Poccianti (Poccianti's "Cisternone", made in Livorno in 1829–1942, is a visionary work comparable to the "revolutionary" architecture of Étienne-Louis Boullée). This gloomy and introverted style, well represented by these last images, perhaps explains also the voluntary departure of Dell'Ira for the Russian front.

The drawings, dated and signed in large part with the acronym ARDIR (Arnaldo Dell'Ira, meaning in Italian"to dare"), were ordered to be donated according to the format and at the time of execution. Just as rich is the correspondence, which includes letters of Dell'Ira from 1924 to 1942, was a veritable mine of information on the background of the great competitions of the time and on the relations between architecture and fascism. All this material will be donated by the heirs of Dell'Ira to the State Archives of Livorno.

== See also ==
- San Salvatore, Terni
- Metaphysical painting

== Sources ==
- Lando Bartoli, Arnaldo Dell'Ira, un Italiano, Livorno, 1948.
- Cipriano Giachetti, La nuova stazione di Firenze, "La Nazione", 4 luglio 1932.
- Giovanni Klaus Koenig, Architettura in Toscana, 1931–1968, Firenze, 1968.
- AA.VV., Angiolo Mazzoni (1894–1979) Architetto tra le due guerre, Casalecchio di Reno, Bologna, 1984.
- AA.VV., Tre architetture degli anni 30 a Firenze, catalogo della mostra, Firenze, 1984.
- Mario Lupano, Marcello Piacentini, Editori Laterza, Roma-Bari 1991
- AA. VV., Marcello Piacentini e Roma, Bollettino della Biblioteca della Facoltà di Architettura dell'Università degli Studi di Roma "La Sapienza" n. 53, 1995
- Franco Borsi, L'ordine monumentale in Europa 1929–1939, Milano, 1986.
