= Metaphysical Interior with Large Factory =

Painting by Giorgio de Chirico

- Artist: Giorgio de Chirico
- Year: 1916
- Medium: Oil on canvas
- Dimensions: 96.3 cm × 73.8 cm (37.9 in × 29.1 in)
- Location: Staatsgalerie Stuttgart, Stuttgart

Metaphysical Interior with Large Factory is an oil-on-canvas painting by the Italian metaphysical painter Giorgio de Chirico, from 1916. It is part of a series that extended late into de Chirico's career.

Like the other works in this series it depicts a small room cluttered with surreal objects. This time the main focus is a painting within the painting, the framed picture of a factory complex. Matilde Battistini states that "The building in the Classical style represents a utopian wish to return to a city "made to the measure of man". The painting also includes drafting tools, which are symbols of the architect and engineers professions, according to Battistini.
