= The Soothsayer's Recompense =

1913 painting by Giorgio de Chirico

- Artist: Giorgio de Chirico
- Year: 1913
- Medium: Oil on canvas
- Dimensions: 135.6 cm × 180 cm (53 3/8 in × 70 7/8 in)
- Location: Philadelphia Museum of Art, Philadelphia
- Accession: 1950-134-38

The Soothsayer's Recompense is a 1913 painting by Italian painter Giorgio de Chirico. It is now in the Philadelphia Museum of Art as part of the permanent collection. It was accessioned in 1950 as one of the thousand items donated to the institution by Walter and Louise Arensberg. The piece was created in France, through a process of "squaring-up" in which Chirico drew a version of the piece divided into nine squares, and subsequently used this draft to quickly create the fleshed-out painting.

== Subject matter ==
The piece depicts an empty city square, a recurring motif in works by Chirico. It also features a locomotive in the background, another recurring motif also found in The Transformed Dream and Gare Montparnasse (The Melancholy of Departure).

The statue at the center of the painting is meant to represent Ariadne, who was the daughter of Minos, King of Crete. She assisted Theseus in his escape from the Labyrinth, but he later abandoned her on the island of Naxos. Like the locomotive and empty square, Ariadne appears in other paintings by Chirico.

== Display history ==
The Soothsayer's Recompense is currently owned by the Philadelphia Museum of Art, and was first shown there in 1954. It originally hung in the home of the Arensberg family, where it inspired Philip Guston to become a painter. Since being accessioned by its current owner, it has been shown elsewhere, including twice at the Estorick Collection of Modern Italian Art in 2003 and again in 2014, and at the Institute of Contemporary Art in 2007.
