= The Double Dream of Spring =

1915 painting by Giorgio de Chirico

- Artist: Giorgio de Chirico
- Year: 1915
- Catalogue: 78956
- Medium: Oil on canvas
- Dimensions: 56.2 cm × 54.3 cm (22 1/8 in × 21 3/8 in)
- Location: Museum of Modern Art; New York
- Accession: 138.1957

The Double Dream of Spring (also known as Doppio Sogno di Primavera, 1915) is a painting by the Italian metaphysical painter Giorgio de Chirico. It is held at the Museum of Modern Art, in New York.

== Description ==
The painting depicts apparently related but separate scenes. The scene on the left shows a statue of a man in a frock-coat from behind. The statue appears to be staring contemplatively into an open sky. The two scenes are separated in the middle by a wooden beam, perhaps part of an easel. Near the base of the beam is a blueprint drawing of an interior, in which large arches and a window open onto a landscape including the stick-like figures of two men meeting, and distant mountains. The scene on the right appears to be looking down on the same landscape from a slightly different angle. Above the landscape is the shape of the head of a tailor's dummy.

Similar dummies appear many times in de Chirico's work (cf. The Seer). This time the dummy's head looms over the landscape like a hot air balloon.

The title was used by John Ashbery for his 1970 book of poems.
