= San Salvatore, Terni =

Roman Catholic church in Terni, Italy

Coordinates: 42°33′36.3″N 12°38′52.3″E

San Salvatore is a Romanesque-style, Roman Catholic church in Terni, region of Umbria, in Italy.

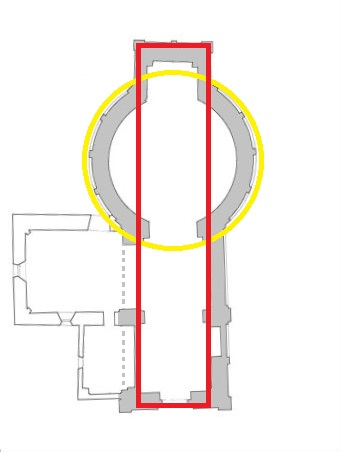
Schematic of the Church with round presbytery, the Romanesque elements are in gray.

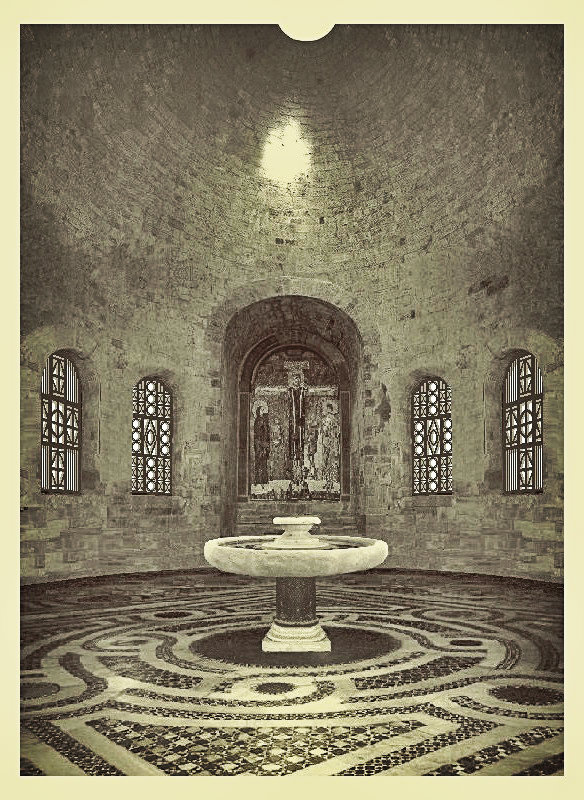
Interior of the rotonda. Project of restoration by Arnaldo Dell'Ira 1941.

== History ==
The present layout of the church at the site was set in the 12th century, but portions are possibly much older. Excavations have also uncovered the base of Roman structures below. The layout is unusual due to its circular presbytery. Chapels were added in the 16th and 17th centuries.

== See also ==
- High medieval domes
