= Venice, Bridge of Rialto (Giorgio de Chirico) =

1950 painting by Giorgio de Chirico

- Artist: Giorgio de Chirico
- Year: 1950
- Medium: Oil on canvas
- Subject: Puente de Rialto in Venice
- Dimensions: 33 cm × 55 cm (13 in × 22 in)
- Location: Museo Soumaya, Mexico City

Venice, Bridge of Rialto is an oil on canvas painting by Giorgio of Chirico, from 1950. It is held at the Museo Soumaya, in Mexico City. The style of this work moves away from his early period of the metaphysical painting, characterized by the inclusion of architecture, sculptures and big empty spaces.

== Description of the work ==
The strong impression that the Italian squares and sights caused on de Chirico is evident in this painting. The main motif here is the Grand Canal. It widens towards the front and some of the sumptuous Venetian edifications line its banks. The Bridge of Rialto is the centre of the composition. It stands out by its white colour, imitated only by one of the lateral constructions.
