= Alberto Savinio =

Italian painter (1891–1952)

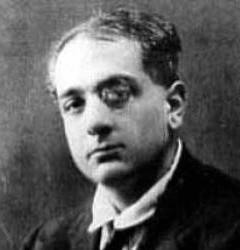
- Born: Andrea Francesco Alberto de Chirico; 25 August 1891; Athens, Kingdom of Greece
- Died: 5 May 1952 (aged 60); Rome, Italy
- Occupations: Writer, painter, musician, journalist, essayist, playwright, set designer, composer
- Spouse: Maria Morino (married 1925)

Alberto Savinio [alˈbɛrto saˈvinjo], born as Andrea Francesco Alberto de Chirico (25 August 1891 – 5 May 1952) was a Greek-Italian writer, painter, musician, journalist, essayist, playwright, set designer and composer. He was the younger brother of 'metaphysical' painter Giorgio de Chirico. His work often dealt with philosophical and psychological themes, and he was also heavily concerned with the philosophy of art.

Throughout his life, Savinio composed five operas, and authored at least forty-seven books, including multiple autobiographies and memoirs. He also extensively wrote and produced works for the theatre. His work received mixed reviews during his lifetime. This was often due to his generally pervasive use of modernist techniques. He was influenced by Apollinaire, Picasso, Jean Cocteau, Max Jacob, and Fernand Léger, and had a significant influence on the surrealist movement.

His paintings are held in various international collections, including the Albertina Museum in Vienna, which features the 1951 Monumento alla musica (Monument to Music).

== Life ==
=== Birth and family ===
Born in Athens, Greece, Andrea De Chirico was the third child of Evaristo de Chirico and Gemma Cervetto De Chirico (a Genoese noble). At the time of his birth, Andrea's parents were living as Italian expatriates in Greece while his father worked on the Greek railway system as an engineer for the Societé des Chemins de Fer de la Thessalie. His elder brother, three years his senior, was the renowned artist Giorgio de Chirico. Andrea also had an elder sister named Adele (or Adelaide), who died six months before his birth. Later in his life, Andrea would reflect upon his foreign birth as a special opportunity to determine his own destiny through the determination of his own national identity.

=== Early life and education ===
Andrea was primarily homeschooled by his mother, while living in Greece. He often depicts his father as educationally restrictive, authoritarian and oppressive. Partly due to his restrictive learning environment at home, Andrea learned to love Greece. At a young age he became enthralled by the Ancient Greek ruins and culture, which were conducive to creativity and fantasy during his childhood. As a result, Andrea would later often credit Greece for his love of critical thinking and irony.

In addition to his homeschooling, Andrea also enjoyed a strong musical education. At the age of twelve, he graduated from the Athens Conservatory with a concentration in piano and music composition. When he was fourteen, his father died. In response, Andrea composed a requiem in his father's memory. Andrea's family then returned to their ethnic homeland of Italy. Staying briefly in Italy, the family again relocated, this time to Munich, Germany. While living in Germany, Andrea began to be tutored in piano and composition by renowned musician Max Reger. While under Reger's tutelage, Andrea composed his first piece to receive critical acclaim, a three-act opera, Carmela; as well as an opera of lesser acclaim, Il tesoro del Rampsenita. Carmela was quickly noticed by composer Pietro Mascagni, and music publisher Ricordi. He was part of the third generation of Lombard line.

By 1911, when Andrea was twenty, his music had become popular enough to be performed in public in Munich. The same year, Andrea set out on his own, moving to Paris, France an epicenter of activity for the European avant-garde and modernist movements. In Paris, he befriended Guillaume Apollinaire, one of the foremost poets, critics, and artists at large in the avant-garde movement. While living in Paris, Andrea also became acquainted with a range of writers and artists such as Pablo Picasso, Jean Cocteau, Max Jacob, and Fernand Léger. Andrea developed an interest in the art of mime during this period, as well.

In 1914, largely in an effort to differentiate himself from his increasingly famous artist-brother, Giorgio de Chirico, Andrea adopted the penname Alberto Savinio. Savinio founded the musical movement Sincerismo (Sincerism) that same year. Sincerismo largely abandoned polyphony and harmony in favor of dissonance and rhythm as its primary musical characteristics. That year also saw the publication of Les Chants de la mi-mort (The Songs of Half-Death), a dramatic poem including original illustrations and a piano suite accompaniment, both also created by Savinio. Les Chants de la mi-mort was written primarily in French, but also included passages written in Italian. The poem consisted of a single act, containing four loosely linked scenes. Les Chants de la mi-mort dealt largely with the concept of sleep (interpretatively referred to as "The Half Death") and was filled with odd, mechanical toy-like characters. This poem's description of the faceless dummy later became a hallmark in the paintings of Giorgio de Chirico.

=== World War I ===
Shortly after the outbreak of World War I, Savinio and his brother returned to Italy in order to enlist in the Italian army. After enlisting, the pair was sent to the military hospital in Ferrara, Italy, where they met Carlo Carrà. This group of three, under the influence of Giovanni Papini, then proceeded to found the artistic movement Scuola Metafisica (Metaphysical Painting). Scuola Metafisica became known as one of the most significant artistic experiences of twentieth-century Italy. In 1917, Savinio was sent to Greece as an interpreter for Italian troops. While stationed there, Savinio gained the chance to rediscover his childhood play-world of Greece, and the influence can be seen in his first published novel, Hermaphrodito. Hermaphrodito was published in 1918, and like Les Chants de la mi-mort, was a multilingual piece, intertwining languages as well as prose and poetry. Hermaphrodito was also a meld of autobiography, fiction, thoughts and fantasies; it has even been called a war journal, as it often deals with specific experiences from World War I. Savinio claimed a very personal connection to the novel, once stating, "Tutto che io sono nasce da li. Tutto che ho fatto viene da li" (Everything that I am springs from there. Everything that I have done comes from there.). After World War I, Savinio relocated to Rome.

=== Middle life ===
Savinio was among the contributors of the Rome-based literary magazine La Ronda between 1919 and 1922. In 1920, he completed Tragedia dell'infanzia (Tragedy of Childhood), a primarily autobiographical collection of episodes illuminating the disconnect between the adult and juvenile experience and perception of the world. Each of the episodes in Tragedia del l'infanzia presents a situation in which the world of adults and "artistic" creativity is contrasted with the world of childhood imaginings. Tragedia del l'infanzia was finally published in 1937.

In 1924, the Metropolitan Opera of New York performed his ballet Perseus. 1925 saw the publication of his second novel, La Casa Ispirata (The Haunted House). Set in 1910 Paris, the novel tells the story of the protagonist-narrator, who is apparently renting a room from a typical bourgeois house, which Savinio describes as being "inhabited by Ghosts". The novel is, in many ways, a darkly comic and grotesque revue of modern life. The scenes of the novel, are at once hyper real and fantastically abstract, with great attention being given to the unconscious.

This year also brought the beginning of collaboration with his brother in Pirandello's Teatro d'Arte in Rome, Italy. The theater had always been a favorite medium for Savinio as it was in many ways a crossroads of the visual, musical and linguistic creativities. Savinio immersed himself in every aspect of the theater, from scripting, to set design. While working at the Teatro d'Arte he wrote Capitan Ulisse, a three-act drama considered fundamental to his body of work. The play was advertised in 1926, but not actually performed due to problems in the theater company. The play was eventually published in 1934, and staged at the Anton Giulio Bragaglia Theater in Rome in 1938. Also while working at the Teatro d'Arte, Savinio met Maria Morino, and proceeded to marry her the following year.

In 1926, Savinio returned to Paris, and began to paint seriously. In 1927, he gave his first one-man show as a painter, at the Bernheim Gallery in Paris. Savinio's contributions to the Avant-Garde movement during this period sharply contrast with the provincialism that was favored by the National Fascist Party in Italy at this time. Angelica o la Notte di Maggio (Angelica or the Night in May), which was a parodical and surreal revisitation of the Ancient Greek myth of Eros and Psyche was published this year, as well. The novel tells the story of Angelica, a poor actress working in a second rate theater in Greece at the end of the nineteenth-century and Baron Felix von Rothspeer, a loveless, older aristocrat. In many ways, Savinio makes the theater a central character in the plot; it is painted as a place where the senses and romance can be deeply explored and discovered.

In 1928, Savinio's daughter, Angelica, was born in Paris; his son, Ruggero, was then born in 1934. Both of his children were named for characters from Ludovico Ariosto's Orlando Furioso (1516). During this period of his life, he was primarily occupied with literary, musical and artistic criticism.

=== Later life and death ===
Infanzia di Nivasio Dolcemare (The Childhood of Nivasio Dolcemare) was published in 1941. This was and is considered one of Savinio's finest novels, containing a witty but intensely narrative-driven style, an autobiographical fantasy about his childhood in Athens (Nivasio is an anagram for Savinio). 1950 saw the publication of two more operas by Savinio, Orfeo vedova and Agenzia Fix. Savinio completed his fifth and final opera, conceived for the radio, Cristoforo Colombo, shortly before his death on 5 May 1952 in Rome, Italy.

== Self determination ==
The penname "Alberto Savinio" was an Italianization of Albert Savine, a minor French writer and translator of Oscar Wilde and Thomas De Quincey. Savinio chose this name partly because Savine was a relative unknown in the literary world. Savinio believed that the selection of a penname allowed him a moment of self-determination; something in which he could choose his own destiny. For Savinio, being an ethnic and cultural Italian was much like a cultural penname for him. In his somewhat autobiographical novel, Infanzia di Nivasio Dolcemare (The Infancy of Nivasio Dolcemare), Savinio would reflect upon the fact that:

as an Italian born outside of Italy, Nivasio Dolcemare considers himself privileged. This "indirect" birth is an ironic situation, as stylistic solution, a condition that has added certain nuances, certain subtleties, certain half and quarter-tone passages to the national faculties of the man Dolcemare which "direct" birth would not have permitted … . Italian more Italian than the Italian since the "Italian" in him is not a "place of birth", but a condition discovered, wanted, conquered.

== Brotherly connection ==
Early in their lives, Andrea and his brother Giorgio were nearly inseparable, even referring to themselves as Castor and Pollux, the warrior twins. As children, there was tremendous collaboration between the brothers that led to strong overlap of themes later in life. The most well noted of these overlapping themes was that of the mythical Greek Argonauts, as a metaphor for their development and journey as artists.

There is evidence to suggest, however, that their relationship frayed in later life. Although their deceased sister Adele appears in and is mentioned frequently in Savinio's memoirs and autobiographies, Giorgio fails to appear at all in any of them.

== Critical review ==
Judgments of Savinio's work varied wildly depending on the phase of his life and the reviewer. Many of Savinio's most critically praised works are also amongst his most disliked and misunderstood. This is largely due to Savinio's frequent and controversial use of modernist techniques for creative expression.

From a very young age, Savinio's piano playing impressed critics nearly unanimously. Guillaume Apollinaire said of it:

I was surprised and beguiled; Savinio mistreated his instrument so much that after each piece the keyboard had to be cleared of chips and splinters. I foresee that within two years he will have gutted every piano in Paris. Savinio will then go on to destroy every piano in the universe, which may be a true liberation.

Judgment of his body of work as a whole was seen in 1954, when the Venice Biennale created a room devoted solely to Savinio's artistic legacy.

According to the art historian Jean Clair, the works of Savinio and his brother Giorgio de Chirico were the basis of both the surrealist movement and magic realism.
