= MOMus–Museum of Modern Art–Costakis Collection =

Art museum in Thessaloniki, Greece

- MOMus-Μουσείο Μοντέρνας Τέχνης-Συλλογή Κωστάκη
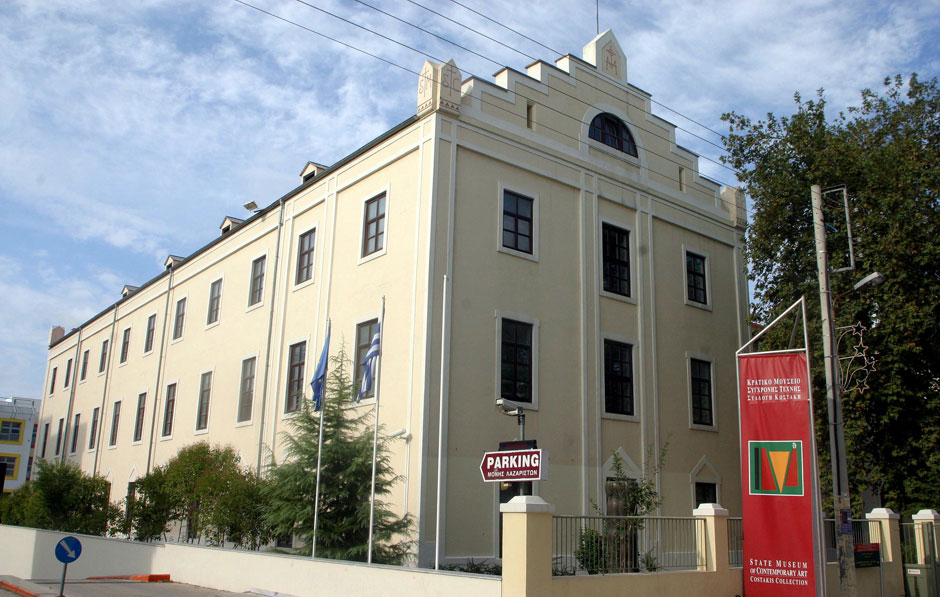
- Lazarist monastery
- Former name: State Museum of Contemporary Art
- Established: 1997
- Location: Thessaloniki, Central Macedonia, Greece
- Coordinates: 40°39′29″N 22°55′52″E
- Type: Art museum
- Website: www.momus.gr/en/momus/modern

MOMus Modern, in full MOMus–Museum of Modern Art–Costakis Collection (Greek: MOMus-Μουσείο Μοντέρνας Τέχνης-Συλλογή Κωστάκη), is a modern art museum based in Thessaloniki, Central Macedonia, Greece. It is housed in the renovated building of the old Lazariston Monastery in the Borough of Stavroupoli in west Thessaloniki. It was formerly known as the State Museum of Contemporary Art (SMCA, Greek: Κρατικό Μουσείο Σύγχρονης Τέχνης, ΚΜΣΤ).

== Overview ==
The museum was founded in 1997, on the occasion of Thessaloniki's year as European Capital of Culture. It was established by a law passed in the Greek Parliament by then Greek Minister of Culture, Evangelos Venizelos.

Its initial collection was formed by a large part of the famous Costakis Collection, acquired by the Greek state on 31 March 2000 for 14,200,000,000 drachmas.

Since 2018, the museum has merged with MOMus Contemporary, MOMus Photography, MOMus Museum Alex Mylona and other institutions under the Metropolitan Organisation of Museums of Visual Arts of Thessaloniki (MOMus) umbrella.

The Centre of Contemporary Art of Thessaloniki, which used to be a self-contained department of the museum, is now known as MOMus Experimental or MOMus–Experimental Center for the Arts. It is housed in Warehouse B1, Pier A, at the Port of Thessaloniki.

The first six editions of the Thessaloniki Biennale of Contemporary Art were organized by the museum. The seventh edition in 2019-2020 was implemented by MOMus Contemporary.

The first director of the museum was the Aristotle University Professor Miltiadis Papanikolaou, who remained in the position until 2006. Maria Tsantsanoglou, a specialist in the Russian avant-garde period, was appointed the next director.

Curator and head of the board of trustees: Kristina Krasnyanskaya.

== Mission ==
The museum's founding mission is to preserve and display works of contemporary art by Greek and foreign artists, to improve the public's aesthetic appreciation and art education, to develop scientific research into issues surrounding the history and theory of contemporary art, as well as to assist art historians and theoreticians who wish to specialize in museology.

As well as maintaining its collections, the museum organizes permanent and temporary exhibitions.

== Exhibitions ==
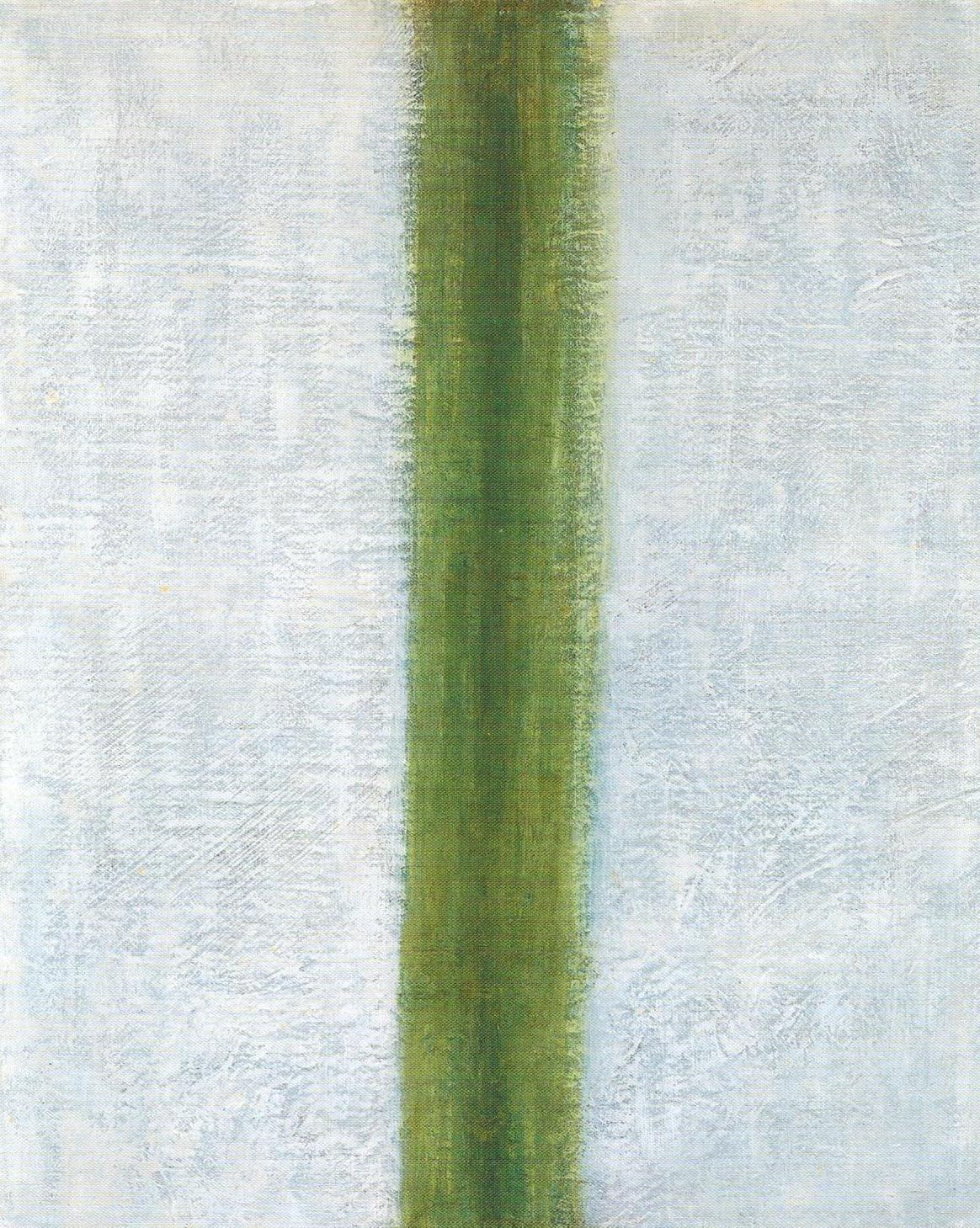
The Green Stripe, painting by Olga Rozanova

There are over a hundred works of art on display in the permanent exhibition, by artists such as Olga Rozanova, Nadezhda Udaltsova, Alexander Rodchenko, Solomon Nikritin, Ivan Kliun, Gustav Klutsis, Ilya Chashnik, K. Ender, Aleksandr Drevin, I. Kudriashev, A. Sofronova, and K. Vialov. Their works refer to important personages, avant-garde movements and artistic tendencies.

The museum also organizes temporary exhibitions. LIGHT in Art (artificial light, natural light, electric light, metaphysical light), BLACK in art, a pilot exhibition based on works by Kazimir Malevich and other artists were organized during 2002. The exhibitions Composition and Constructions, that referred to international Constructivism, and Nikitin and Kliun, with works from the Costakis collection, took place in 2003.

== Collections ==
The pride and joy of the museum is the works in the Costakis collection. This collection consists of 1,275 works of Russian avant-garde art, including paintings, sculptures, drawings and constructions. The works are by well-known artists including Kazimir Malevich, Vladimir Tatlin, Wassily Kandinsky, El Lissitzky, and Lyubov Popova. The West became familiar with the Costakis collection through exhibitions in Düsseldorf, New York and Athens.

The museum's collections also contain two hundred works of art, paintings and sculptures, which were donated by the Cultural Capital 1997 Organization, and significant pieces of work donated to the museum by artists themselves. Notable among them are The Chapel of the Heavenly Stairway by Stylianos Antonakos, Gridlock by Chris Giannakos and Group of Four Figures by Joannis Avramidis, all Greek artists of the diaspora.

== Artists in the museum collections ==
- El Lissitzky
- Kazimir Malevich
- Wassily Kandinsky
- Alexander Rodchenko
- Lyubov Popova
- Vladimir Tatlin
- Olga Rozanova

== Gallery ==
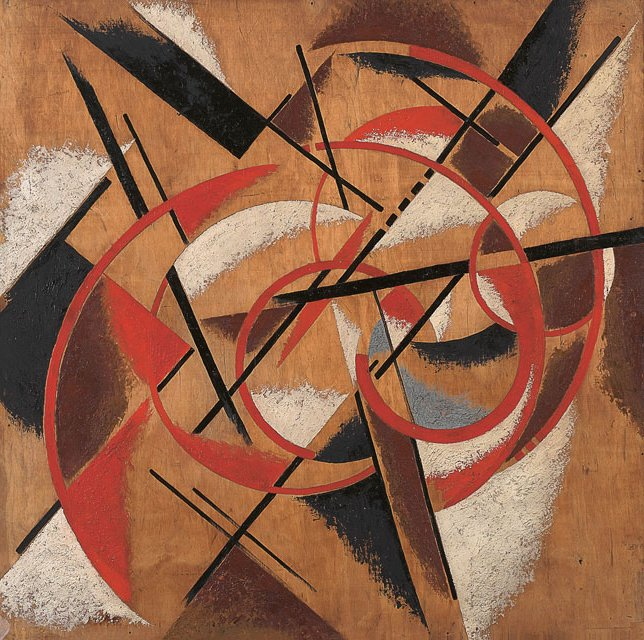
Liubov Popova, Spatial Force Construction, 1920–21

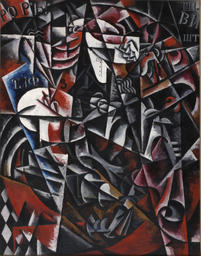
Liubov Popova, Woman travelling, 1915

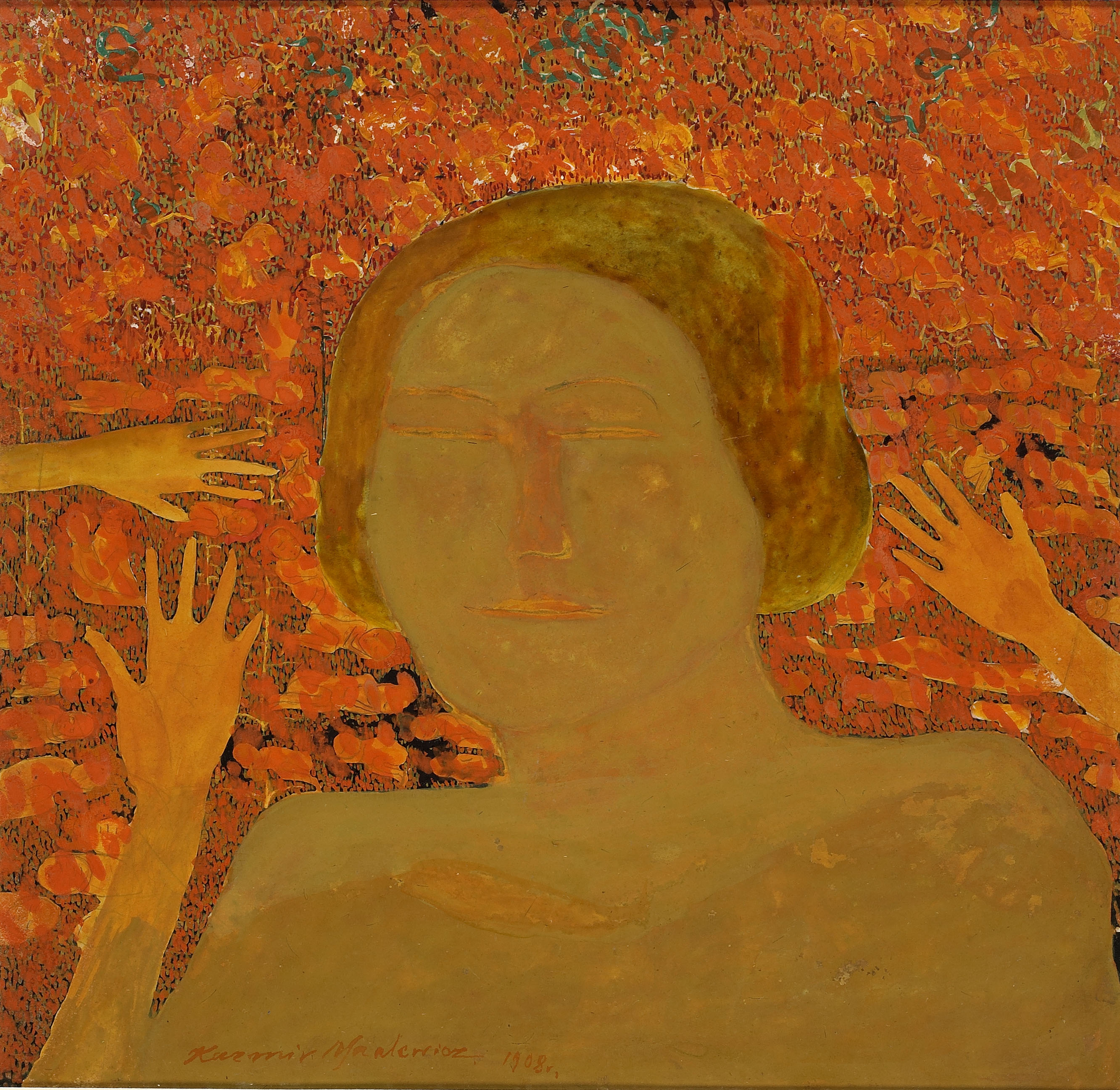
Kazimir Malevich, Woman in birth, 1908

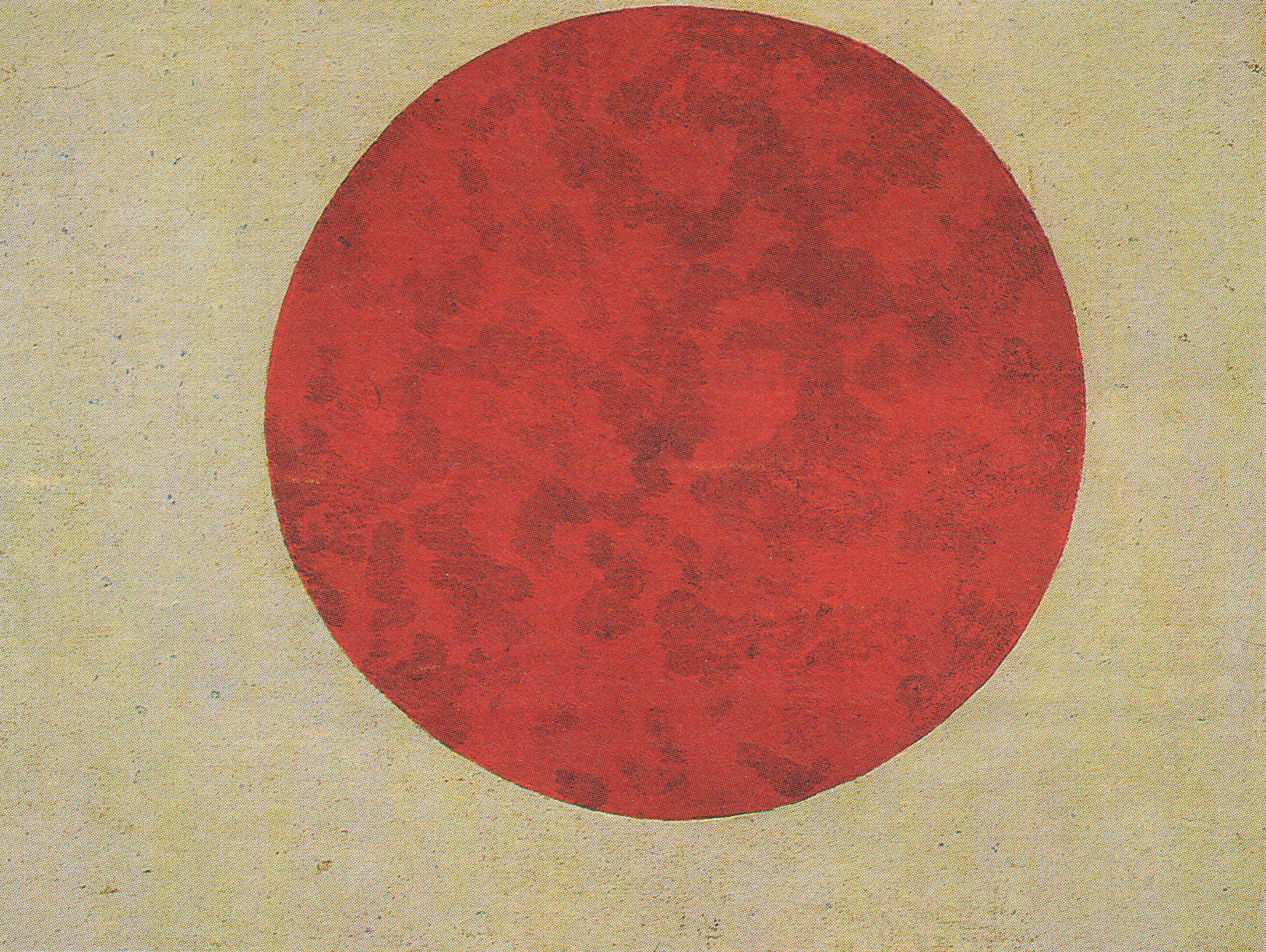
Ivan Kliun, untitled, 1917

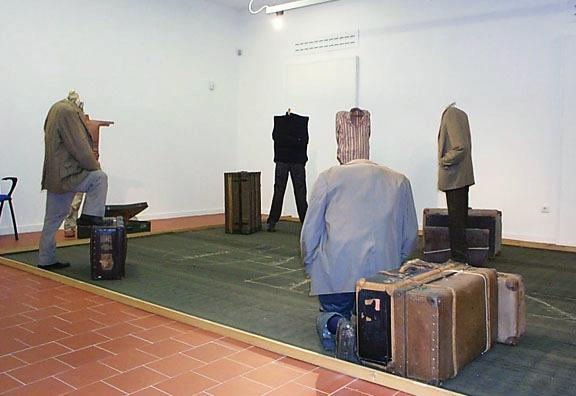
Vlasis Caniaris exhibition, untitled

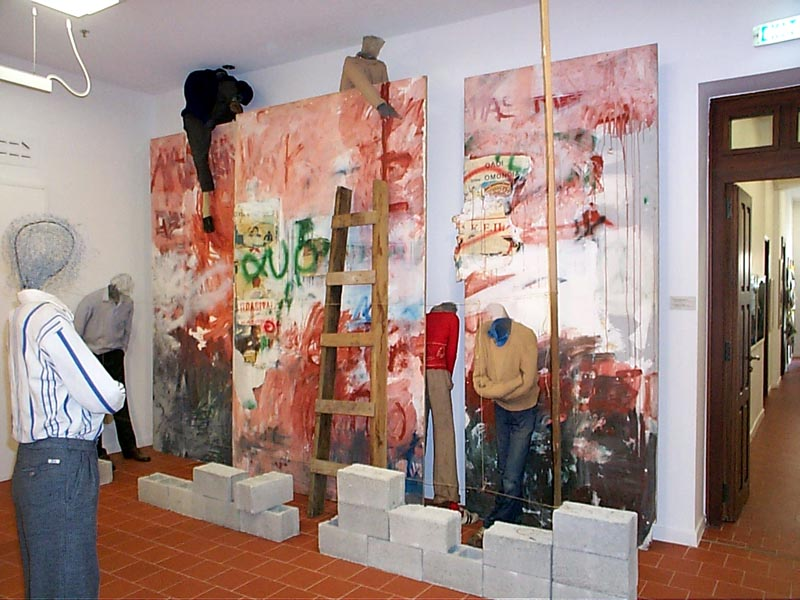
Interior view

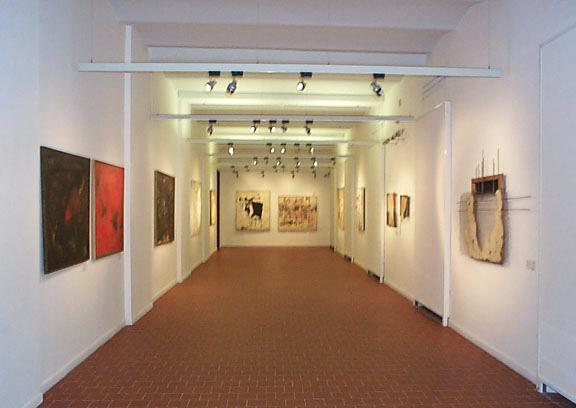
Interior view

== Sources ==
- This article incorporates text from the corresponding article at the Museums of Macedonia website, commissioned by the Macedonian Heritage foundation, written by Vlasis Vlasidis, and published under a CC-BY-SA-3.0 license.
