= Papanikolaou =

Papanikolaou or Papanicolaou (Greek: Παπανικολάου) is a Greek patronymic surname, meaning "child of Father Nikolaos", used in Greece and Cyprus.

It may refer to:

== People ==
- Georgios Papanikolaou (1883–1962), Greek doctor, inventor of the pap smear test
- Christos Papanikolaou (born 1941), Greek pole vaulter
- George C. Papanicolaou (born 1943), Greek-American mathematician
- Miltiadis Papanikolaou (born 1947), Professor of History of Arts, Aristotle University of Thessaloniki
- John Paul Papanicolaou (1949–2010), Greek businessman
- Dimitris Papanikolaou (born 1977), Greek basketball player
- Nikos Papanikolaou (basketball) (born 1985), Greek basketball player
- Kostas Papanikolaou, Greek basketball player in the National Basketball Association

== Other ==
- Papanicolaou stain, a histological technique
- Papanicolaou test, a gynecological test
