= Giorgio de Chirico =

Italian artist (1888–1978)

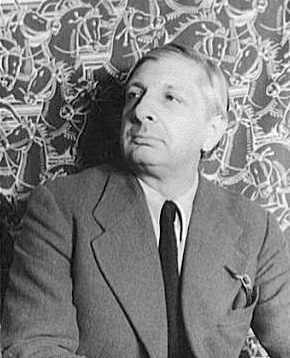
- De Chirico photographed by Carl Van Vechten, 1936
- Born: Giuseppe Maria Alberto Giorgio de Chirico; 10 July 1888; Volos, Greece
- Died: 20 November 1978 (aged 90); Rome, Italy
- Resting place: Church of San Francesco a Ripa, Rome; 41.885127°N 12.473186°E
- Education: Athens School of Fine Arts; Academy of Fine Arts
- Known for: Painting; sculpture; drawing; costume; stage design
- Movement: Metaphysical art; surrealism
- Spouses: Raissa Gourevitch (m. 1930–1931) Isabella Pakszwer Far (m. 1946)

Signature
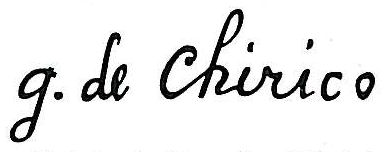

The Song of Love, 1914, oil on canvas, 73 × 59.1 cm, Museum of Modern Art, New York

Giuseppe Maria Alberto Giorgio de Chirico (/ˈkɪrɪkoʊ/ KIRR-ik-oh; Italian: [ˈdʒordʒo de ˈkiːriko]; 10 July 1888 – 20 November 1978) was an Italian artist and writer born in Volos, Greece. In the years before World War I, he founded the scuola metafisica art movement, which profoundly influenced the surrealists. His best-known works often feature Roman arcades, long shadows, mannequins, trains, and illogical perspective. His imagery reflects his affinity for the philosophy of Arthur Schopenhauer and of Friedrich Nietzsche, and for the mythology of his birthplace.

After 1919, de Chirico became a critic of modern art, studied traditional painting techniques, and later worked in a neoclassical or neo-Baroque style, while frequently revisiting the metaphysical themes of his earlier work.

== Early life and works ==
Giuseppe Maria Alberto Giorgio de Chirico was born in Volos, Greece, as the eldest son of Gemma Cervetto and Evaristo de Chirico. His mother was a baroness from Genoa, with Greek origins from Smyrna, and his father, a baron from Sicily, also had Greek ancestry. The Kyriko or Chirico family was of Greek origin, having moved from Rhodes to Palermo in 1523 together with 4,000 other Greek Catholic families. De Chirico's family was in Greece at the time of his birth because his father, an engineer, was in charge of the construction of railroad projects, including the Pelion railway. His younger brother, Andrea Francesco Alberto, became a famous writer, painter and composer under the pseudonym Alberto Savinio.

Beginning in 1900, de Chirico studied drawing and painting at Athens Polytechnic—mainly under the guidance of the Greek painters Georgios Roilos and Georgios Jakobides. After Evaristo de Chirico's death in 1905, the family relocated in 1906 to Germany, after first visiting Florence. De Chirico entered the Academy of Fine Arts in Munich, where he studied under Gabriel von Hackl and Carl von Marr and read the writings of the philosophers Friedrich Nietzsche, Arthur Schopenhauer and Otto Weininger. There, he also studied the works of Arnold Böcklin and Max Klinger. The style of his earliest paintings, such as The Dying Centaur (1909), shows the influence of Böcklin.

== Metaphysical art ==
Le mauvais génie d'un roi (The Evil Genius of a King), 1914–15, oil on canvas, 61 × 50.2 cm, Museum of Modern Art

The Seer, 1914–15, oil on canvas, 89.6 × 70.1 cm, Museum of Modern Art

Great Metaphysical Interior, 1917, oil on canvas, 95.9 × 70.5 cm, Museum of Modern Art

Self-portrait (Autoritratto), 1920, oil on wood, 50.2 × 39.5 cm, Pinakothek der Moderne

De Chirico returned to Italy in the summer of 1909 and spent six months in Milan. By 1910, he was beginning to paint in a simpler style with flat, anonymous surfaces. At the beginning of 1910, he moved to Florence, where he painted the first of his 'Metaphysical Town Square' series, The Enigma of an Autumn Afternoon, after the revelation he felt in Piazza Santa Croce. He also painted The Enigma of the Oracle while in Florence. In July 1911, he spent a few days in Turin on his way to Paris. De Chirico was profoundly moved by what he called the "metaphysical aspect" of Turin, especially the architecture of its archways and piazzas. The paintings de Chirico produced between 1909 and 1919, his metaphysical period, are characterized by haunted, brooding moods evoked by their images. At the start of this period, his subjects were motionless cityscapes inspired by the bright daylight of Mediterranean cities, but gradually he turned his attention to studies of cluttered storerooms, sometimes inhabited by mannequin-like hybrid figures. De Chirico's conception of Metaphysical art was strongly influenced by his reading of Nietzsche, whose style of writing fascinated de Chirico with its suggestions of unseen auguries beneath the appearance of things.

De Chirico found inspiration in the unexpected sensations that familiar places or things sometimes produced in him: In a manuscript of 1909, he wrote of the "host of strange, unknown and solitary things that can be translated into painting ... What is required above all is a pronounced sensitivity." Metaphysical art combined everyday reality with mythology, and evoked inexplicable moods of nostalgia, tense expectation, and estrangement. The picture space often featured illogical, contradictory, and drastically receding perspectives. Among de Chirico's most frequent motifs were arcades, of which he wrote: "The Roman arcade is fate ... its voice speaks in riddles which are filled with a peculiarly Roman poetry."

De Chirico moved to Paris in July 1911, where he joined his brother, Andrea. Through his brother, he met Pierre Laprade, a member of the jury at the Salon d'Automne, where he exhibited three of his works: Enigma of the Oracle, Enigma of an Afternoon and Self-Portrait. During 1913, he exhibited paintings at the Salon des Indépendants and Salon d'Automne; his work was noticed by Pablo Picasso and Guillaume Apollinaire, and he sold his first painting, The Red Tower. His time in Paris also resulted in the production of de Chirico's Ariadne. In 1914, through Apollinaire, he met the art dealer Paul Guillaume, with whom he signed a contract for his artistic output. At the outbreak of World War I, de Chirico returned to Italy. Upon his arrival in May 1915, he enlisted in the army, but he was considered unfit for work and assigned to the hospital at Ferrara. The shop windows of that town inspired a series of paintings that feature biscuits, maps, and geometric constructions in indoor settings. In Ferrara, he met with Carlo Carrà and together they founded the pittura metafisica movement.

== Return to order ==
De Chirico continued to paint, and he transferred to Rome in 1918. Starting from 1918, his work was exhibited extensively in Europe. In November 1919, de Chirico published an article in Valori plastici entitled "The Return of Craftsmanship", in which he advocated a return to traditional methods and iconography. This article heralded an abrupt change in his artistic orientation, as he adopted a classicizing manner inspired by such old masters as Raphael and Signorelli, and became part of the post-war return to order in the arts. He became an outspoken opponent of modern art.

In the early 1920s, the Surrealist writer André Breton discovered one of de Chirico's metaphysical paintings on display in Guillaume's Paris gallery, and was enthralled. Numerous young artists who were similarly affected by de Chirico's imagery became the core of the Paris Surrealist group centred around Breton. In 1924, de Chirico visited Paris and was accepted into the group, although the surrealists were severely critical of his post-metaphysical work.

De Chirico met and married his first wife, the Russian ballerina Raissa Gurievich (1894–1979) in 1925, and together they moved to Paris. His relationship with the Surrealists grew increasingly contentious, as they publicly disparaged his new work; by 1926, he had come to regard them as "cretinous and hostile". They soon parted ways in acrimony. In 1928, he held his first exhibition in New York City and shortly afterwards, in London. He wrote essays on art and other subjects, and in 1929 published a novel entitled Hebdomeros, the Metaphysician. Also in 1929, he made stage designs for Sergei Diaghilev.

== Later works ==
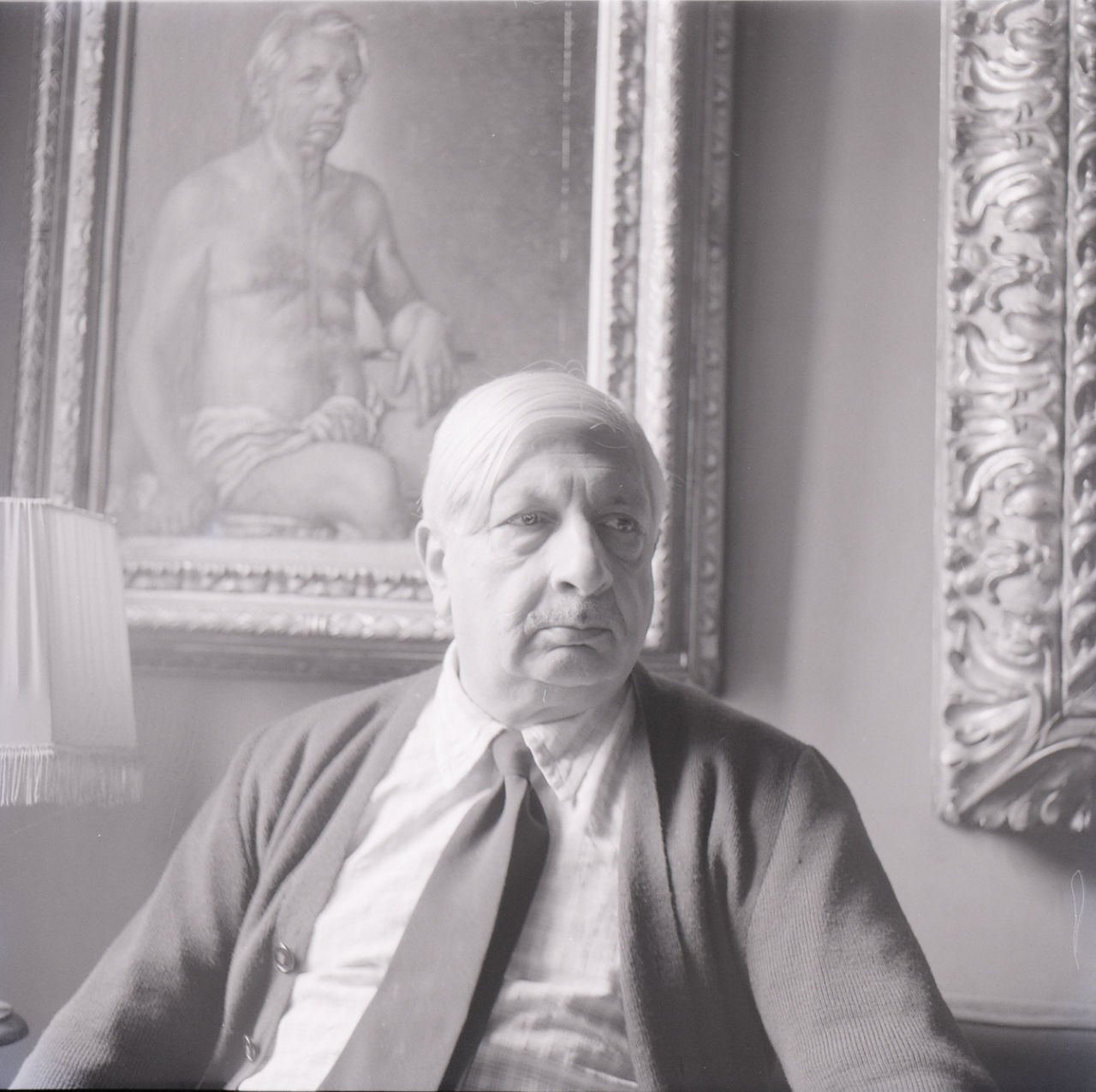
De Chirico in 1970, photographed by Paolo Monti. Fondo Paolo Monti, BEIC

In 1930, de Chirico met his second wife, Isabella Pakszwer Far (1909–1990), a Russian, with whom he would remain for the rest of his life. Together they moved to Italy in 1932 and to the US in 1936, finally settling in Rome in 1944. In 1948, he bought a house near the Spanish Steps; now the Giorgio de Chirico House Museum, a museum dedicated to his work. In 1939, he adopted a neo-Baroque style influenced by Rubens.

This artistic phase, which lasted until the late 60s, is sometimes referred to as the 'Baroque season'. During this time, de Chirico drew inspiration from artists such as Tintoretto, Dürer, Raphael, Delacroix and Renoir. The artist, far from willing to achieve realism in his paintings, strives to create images charged with myths and visions, for an art that is still literally "metaphysical", beyond reality. During these years, de Chirico also studied and rediscovered the painting techniques adopted by old masters, such as Titian: "So I started doing copies of the old masters. In Rome ... in Florence ... and then I also got interested in their techniques, I consulted numerous treatises on painting, both ancient and modern."

De Chirico's later paintings never received the same critical praise as did those from his metaphysical period. He resented this, as he thought his later work was better and more mature. He nevertheless produced backdated "self-forgeries" both to profit from his earlier success and as an act of revenge, retribution for the critical preference for his early work. He also denounced many paintings attributed to him in public and private collections as forgeries. In 1945, he published his memoirs.

De Chirico remained extremely prolific even as he approached his 90th year. During the 1960s, Massimiliano Fuksas worked in his atelier. In 1974, de Chirico was elected to the French Académie des Beaux-Arts. He died in Rome on 20 November 1978. In 1992, his remains were moved to the Roman church of San Francesco a Ripa.

== Style ==
De Chirico's best-known works are the paintings of his metaphysical period. In them, he developed a repertoire of motifs—empty arcades, towers, elongated shadows, mannequins, and trains, among others—that he arranged to create "images of forlornness and emptiness" that paradoxically also convey a feeling of "power and freedom". According to Sanford Schwartz, de Chirico—whose father was a railroad engineer—painted images that suggest "the way you take in buildings and vistas from the perspective of a train window. His towers, walls, and plazas seem to flash by, and you are made to feel the power that comes from seeing things that way: you feel you know them more intimately than the people do who live with them day by day."

In 1982, Robert Hughes wrote that de Chirico

could condense voluminous feeling through metaphor and association ... In The Joy of Return, 1915, de Chirico's train has once more entered the city ... a bright ball of vapor hovers directly above its smokestack. Perhaps it comes from the train and is near us. Or possibly it is a cloud on the horizon, lit by the sun that never penetrates the buildings, in the last electric blue silence of dusk. It contracts the near and the far, enchanting one's sense of space. Early de Chiricos are full of such effects. Et quid amabo nisi quod aenigma est? ("What shall I love if not the enigma?")—this question, inscribed by the young artist on his self-portrait in 1911, is their subtext.

In this, de Chirico resembles his more representational American contemporary, Edward Hopper: their pictures' low sunlight, their deep and often irrational shadows, their empty walkways and portentous silences creating an enigmatic visual poetry.

== Legacy ==
De Chirico won praise for his work almost immediately from the writer Guillaume Apollinaire, who helped to introduce his work to the later Surrealists. De Chirico strongly influenced the Surrealist movement: Yves Tanguy wrote how one day in 1922 he saw one of de Chirico's paintings in an art dealer's window, and was so impressed by it he resolved on the spot to become an artist, although he had never even held a brush. Other Surrealists who acknowledged de Chirico's influence include Max Ernst, Salvador Dalí, and René Magritte, who described his first sighting of de Chirico's The Song of Love as "one of the most moving moments of my life: my eyes saw thought for the first time."

Michelangelo Antonioni, an Italian film director, said he was influenced by de Chirico. Some comparison can be made to the long takes in Antonioni's films from the 1960s, in which the camera continues to linger on desolate cityscapes populated by a few distant figures, or none at all, in the absence of the film's protagonists. Other artists as diverse as Giorgio Morandi, Carlo Carrà, Paul Delvaux, Carel Willink, Harue Koga, Philip Guston, Andy Warhol, and Mark Kostabi were influenced by de Chirico. De Chirico's style has influenced several filmmakers, particularly in the 1950s through 1970s. The visual style of the French animated film Le Roi et l'oiseau, by Paul Grimault and Jacques Prévert, was influenced by de Chirico's work, primarily via Tanguy, a friend of Prévert. The visual style of Valerio Zurlini's film The Desert of the Tartars (1976) was influenced by de Chirico's work.

In 1958, Riverside Records used a reproduction of de Chirico's 1915 painting The Seer (originally painted as a tribute to French poet Arthur Rimbaud) as the cover art for pianist Thelonious Monk's live album Misterioso. The choice was made to capitalize on Monk's popularity with intellectual and bohemian fans from venues such as the Five Spot Café, where the album had been recorded, but Monk biographer Robin Kelley later observed deeper connections between the painting and the pianist's music; Rimbaud had "called on the artist to be a seer in order to plumb the depths of the unconscious in the quest for clairvoyance ... The one-eyed figure represented the visionary. The architectural forms and the placement of the chalkboard evoked the unity of art and science—a perfect symbol for an artist whose music has been called 'mathematical.'"

Writers who have appreciated de Chirico include John Ashbery, who has called Hebdomeros "probably ... the finest [major work of Surrealist fiction]". Several of Sylvia Plath's poems are influenced by de Chirico. In his book Blizzard of One, Mark Strand included a poetic diptych called "Two de Chiricos": "The Philosopher's Conquest" and "The Disquieting Muses". Gabriele Tinti composed three poems, inspired by de Chirico's paintings: The Nostalgia of the Poet (1914), The Uncertainty of the Poet (1913), and Ariadne (1913), works in the Peggy Guggenheim Collection, the Tate, and the Metropolitan Museum of Art, respectively. The poems were read by actor Burt Young at the Met in 2016.

The box art for Fumito Ueda's PlayStation 2 game Ico sold in Japan and Europe was strongly influenced by de Chirico. The cover art of New Order's single "Thieves Like Us" is based on de Chirico's painting The Evil Genius of a King. The music video for the David Bowie song "Loving the Alien" was partly influenced by de Chirico. Bowie was an admirer of his genderless tailors' dummies. A 2018 study by researchers from the Magna Græcia University, published in Frontiers in Neurology, suggested that de Chirico suffered from Alice in Wonderland syndrome (AIWS), a neurological disorder affecting a person's perception, leading the individual to perceive the sizes of some parts of their body and other objects, in an unreal way, like Alice in Lewis Carroll's novel.

== Honours ==
- 1958: Member of the Royal Academy of Science, Letters and Fine Arts of Belgium.
- Académie de France

== Selected works ==
The Red Tower (1913), Peggy Guggenheim Collection

- Flight of the Centauri, Enigma of an Autumn Afternoon and Enigma of the Oracle (1909)
- Ritratto di Andrea de Chirico (Alias Alberto Savinio) (1909–1910)
- The Enigma of the Hour (1911)
- The Nostalgia of the Infinite (1911), or 1912–1913
- Melanconia, The Enigma of the Arrival and La Matinée Angoissante (1912)
- The Soothsayer's Recompense, The Red Tower, Ariadne, The Awakening of Ariadne, The Uncertainty of the Poet, La Statua Silenziosa, The Anxious Journey, Melancholy of a Beautiful Day, Le Rêve Transformé, and Self-Portrait (1913)
- The Anguish of Departure (begun in 1913), Portrait of Guillaume Apollinaire, The Nostalgia of the Poet, L'Énigme de la fatalité, Gare Montparnasse (The Melancholy of Departure), The Song of Love, The Enigma of a Day, The Philosopher's Conquest, The Child's Brain, The Philosopher and the Poet, Still Life: Turin in Spring, Piazza d'Italia (Autumn Melancholy), and Melancholy and Mystery of a Street (1914)
- The Evil Genius of a King (begun in 1914), The Seer (or The Prophet), Piazza d'Italia, The Double Dream of Spring, The Purity of a Dream, Two Sisters (The Jewish Angel) and The Duo (1915)
- Andromache, The Melancholy of Departure, The Disquieting Muses, Metaphysical Interior with Biscuits (1916)
- Metaphysical Interior with Large Factory and The Faithful Servitor (both began in 1916), The Great Metaphysician, Ettore e Andromaca, Metaphysical Interior, Geometric Composition with Landscape and Factory and Great Metaphysical Interior (1917)

Il grande metafisico (The Grand Metaphysician), 1917, oil on canvas, 104.8 x 69.5 cm

- Il grande metafisico (The Grand Metaphysician) (1917)
- Metaphysical Muses and Hermetic Melancholy (1918)
- Still Life with Salami and The Sacred Fish (1919)
- Self-portrait (1920)

The Disquieting Muses (1947), replica of the 1916 painting, University of Iowa Museum of Art

- Italian Piazza, Maschere and Departure of the Argonauts (1921)
- The Great Tower (1921)
- The Prodigal Son (1922)
- Florentine Still Life (c. 1923)
- The House with the Green Shutters (1924)
- The Great Machine (1925) Honolulu Museum of Art
- Au Bord de la Mer, Le Grand Automate, The Terrible Games, Mannequins on the Seashore and The Painter (1925)
- La Commedia e la Tragedia (Commedia Romana), The Painter's Family and Cupboards in a Valley (1926)
- L'Esprit de Domination, The Eventuality of Destiny (Monumental Figures), Mobili nella valle and The Archaeologists (1927)
- Temple et Forêt dans la Chambre (1928)
- Gladiatori (began in 1927), The Archaeologists IV (from the series Metamorphosis), The return of the Prodigal son I (from the series Metamorphosis) and Bagnante (Ritratto di Raissa) (1929)
- I fuochi sacri (for the Calligrammes) 1929
- Illustrations from the book Calligrammes by Guillaume Apollinaire (1930)
- I Gladiatori (Combattimento) (1931)
- Milan Cathedral, 1932
- Cavalos a Beira-Mar (1932–1933)
- Cavalli in Riva al Mare (1934)
- La Vasca di Bagni Misteriosi (1936)
- The Vexations of The Thinker (1937)
- Self-portrait (1935–1937)
- Archeologi (1940)
- Illustrations from the book L'Apocalisse (1941)
- Portrait of Clarice Lispector (1945)
- Villa Medici – Temple and Statue (1945)
- Minerva (1947)
- Metaphysical Interior with Workshop (1948)
- Venecia, Puente de Rialto
- Fiat (1950)
- Piazza d'Italia (1952)
- The Fall – Via Crucis (1947–54)
- Venezia, Isola di San Giorgio (1955)
- Salambò su un cavallo impennato (1956)
- Metaphysical Interior with Biscuits (1958)
- Piazza d'Italia (1962)
- Cornipedes, (1963)
- La mia mano sinistra, (1963), Chianciano Museum of Art
- Manichino (1964)
- Ettore e Andromaca (1966)
- The Return of Ulysses, Interno Metafisico con Nudo Anatomico and Mysterious Baths – Flight Toward the Sea (1968)
- Il rimorso di Oreste, La Biga Invincibile and Solitudine della Gente di Circo (1969)
- Orfeo Trovatore Stanco, Intero Metafisico and Muse with Broken Column (1970)
- Metaphysical Interior with Setting Sun (1971)
- Sole sul cavalletto (1973)
- Mobili e rocce in una stanza, La Mattina ai Bagni misteriosi, Piazza d'Italia con Statua Equestre, La mattina ai bagni misteriosi and Ettore e Andromaca (1973)
- Pianto d'amore – Ettore e Andromaca and The Sailors' Barracks (1974)

== Writings ==
- Hebdomeros (1929)
- The Memoirs of Giorgio De Chirico, trans. Margaret Crosland (Da Capo Press 1994)
- Geometry of Shadows (poems), trans. Stefania Heim (Public Space Books 2019)

== Films about de Chirico ==
- Aenigma Est (1990) – Director: Dimitri Mavrikios; Screenplay: Thomas Moschopoulos, Dimitri Mavrikios
- Giorgio de Chirico: Argonaut of the Soul (2010) – documentary film: Directors and screenplay: Kostas Anestis and George Lagdaris
