= The Song of Love =

1914 painting by Giorgio de Chirico

- Artist: Giorgio de Chirico
- Year: 1914
- Catalogue: 80419
- Medium: Oil on canvas
- Dimensions: 73 cm × 59.1 cm (28 3/4 in × 23 3/8 in)
- Location: Museum of Modern Art, New York
- Accession: 950.1979

The Song of Love (also known as Le chant d'amour or Love Song) is a 1914 painting by Italian metaphysical painter Giorgio de Chirico. It is one of the most famous works by Chirico and an early example of his pre-surrealist style, though it was painted ten years before the movement was "founded" by André Breton in 1924.

It depicts an outdoor architectural setting similar to other works by Chirico at this time. This time however, the main focus is a small wall on which is mounted a Greek sculpted head and a surgeon's glove. Below it is a green ball. On the horizon is the outline of a locomotive, an image that recurs several times during this period of Chirico's career and that has been interpreted as a symbol of de Chirico’s father, an engineer who was involved in the planning of railroad lines in Greece.

== Metaphysical art movement ==
The metaphysical art movement was created by Chirico and Carlo Carrà, who had previously been a futurist. These paintings would depict Italian city squares that are unnaturally devoid of people. These city squares would often include a grouping of objects that provide a strange juxtaposition. With these driving elements in his paintings, Chirico created a dreamlike reality that was beyond the physical world. Aspects like the strange grouping of objects in The Song of Love are what André Breton and the surrealists looked up to when organizing their movement. Though the actual art movement lasted only the six months Chirico and Carrà worked together, metaphysical art is the movement associated with all of Chirico's work after 1911.

== The painting ==
Chirico presents a bust of a classical sculpture, a rubber ball, and a rubber glove on a canvas in between some buildings with a train passing by in a scene that spurs a sense of confusion. The bust could be a representation of Chirico's love of classical art and a disappearing age. Chirico uses the rubber glove as a mold of a hand that implies the void of human presence. The buildings set up a scene that is reminiscent of the cityscapes of Chirico's past.
