= Giorgos Papanikolaou =

Greek politician

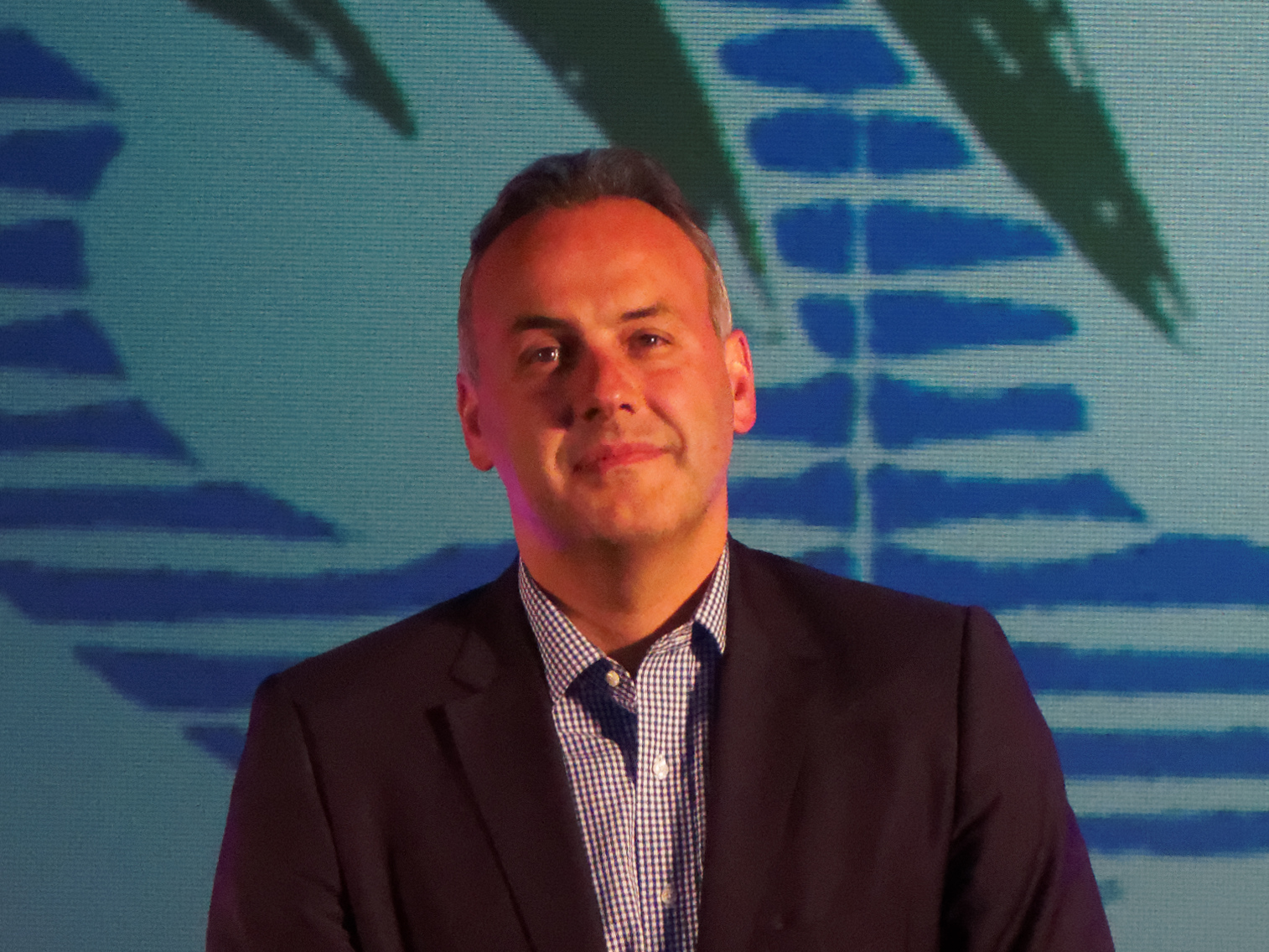
Giorgos Papanikolaou in 2017

Georgios Pavlou Papanikolaou (born 15 August 1977) is a member of the European Parliament, in the group of the European People's Party (Christian Democrats). He was elected for the period 2009–2014, in the European Elections that took place on 16 July 2009 all over the European Union.

Georgios Papanikolaou was born 15 August 1977 in Glyfada, Greece. He is a lawyer in Athens, Greece and was the president of the youth branch of the political party "New Democracy" in Greece from 2004 to 2009.
