= Hélène Harvitt =

American professor of French

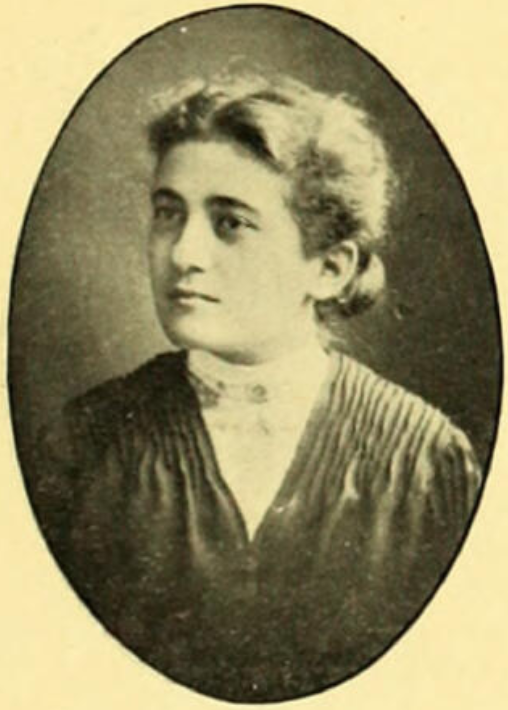
- Harvitt, from the 1907 yearbook of Barnard College
- Born: Helen Josephine Harvitt; November 12, 1884; Portland, Oregon, U.S.
- Died: March 1972 (age 87); New York, New York, U.S.
- Occupations: Translator, editor, college professor

Hélène Josephine Harvitt (November 12, 1884 – March 1972) was an American college professor, translator, and editor. She taught French at Brooklyn College, and was the editor-in-chief of The French Review.

== Early life and education ==
Harvitt was born in Portland, Oregon, and raised in Brooklyn, the daughter of Joseph Harvitt and Sophia Rabinowitz Harvitt. Her parents were both immigrants from the Russian Empire; her mother was born in Odesa and her father, a dentist, was born in Kyiv. She graduated from Barnard College in 1907. She earned a Ph.D. at Columbia University in 1913, with further graduate work at the Sorbonne.

== Career ==
Harvitt taught French and Spanish at Teachers College, Columbia University. She taught French at Brooklyn College from 1928 until she retired in 1955. She was the sole American delegate at the 1931 International Congress of Teachers, held in Paris. She was longtime editor of The French Review, published by the American Association of Teachers of French. In 1937, she was honored by the French government with a knighthood in the Legion of Honour, for her efforts on behalf of French language and literature.

== Publications ==
=== Original works ===
- Eustorg De Beaulieu; A Disciple of Marot 1495(?)–1552 (1918)
- "Hugues Salel, Poet and Translator" (1919)
- "A New French Book on the U.S.A." (1930, book review in The Crisis)

=== Translations and edited works ===
- Smetana, The Bartered Bride (1908, libretto by Karel Sabina, translated by Harvitt)
- Contes Divers: The Walter-Ballard French Series (1917, textbook)
- Molière, L'École des femmes (1918, translated and edited by Harvitt)
- Georges Duhamel, Stories and Sketches (1919, edited by Harvitt)
- Alain-Fournier, Le Grand Meaulnes (1922, edited by Harvitt)
- Henri Ghéon, La Farce du Pend dépendu and Prosper Mérimée, Le Carrosse du Saint-Sacrement (1927, editor)
- Huisman and Huisman, Contes et légendes du moyen age français (1928, edited with Julien J. Champenois)
- Jacques Deval, Tovaritch (1934, co-edited with Frédéric Ernst)
- Representative plays from the French theatre of today: Vildrac, Sarment, Bernstein, Lenormand, Claudel (1940)

== Personal life ==
Harvitt spent many of her summers in France. She died in 1972, at the age of 87, at a nursing home in New York City.
