= Franco Borsi =

Italian architectural historian

Franco Borsi (1925–2008) was an Italian architect and architectural historian. He was professor of history of architecture at the University of Florence, and wrote on Giovanni Michelucci, Leon Battista Alberti, Gian Lorenzo Bernini and Donato Bramante.

== Life ==
Franco Borsi studied architecture at the University of Florence. After an architectural internship in Norway, he moved to Rome. As an architect he specialized in interior architecture, particularly nightclubs in the Via Veneto area. In the 1960s he started teaching in the Faculty of Architecture at the University of Florence, becoming a professor of the history of architecture.

== Works ==
- (with G. K. Koenig) Architettura dell'espressionismo. Genoa: Vitali e Ghianda; Paris: Vincent, Fréal & Cie, 1967.
- La chiesa di S. Andrea al Quirinale, 1967
- (with Paulo Portoghesi) Victor Horta, 1969
- (with Robert-L. Delevoy and H. Wieser-Benedetti) Bruxelles 1900. Roma: Officina, 1972.
- (ed.) Leon Battista Alberti: the complete works. Translated by Rudolf G. Carpanini. London: Faber & Faber, 1973
- Firenze del Cinquecento. Rome: Editalia, 1974
- (ed. with Geno Pampaloni) Le Piazze. Novara: Istituto geografico De Agostini, 1975.
- L'architettura del principe. Florence: Giunti-Martello, 1980.
- Bernini. Translated from the Italian Bernini architetto by Robert Erich Wolf. New York: Rizzoli, 1984.
- (ed.) Fortuna degli Etruschi. Milan: Electa, 1985
- (with Ezio Godoli) Vienna 1900: architecture and design. Translated from the Italian Vienne 1900. New York: Rizzoli, 1986.
- The monumental era: European architecture and design, 1929-1939. Translated from L'ordre monumental by Pamela Marwood. New York: Rizzoli, 1987.
- Bramante. Milan : Electa, 1989
- (with Ezio Godoli) Paris 1900. Translated from the Italian by J. C. Palmes. New York: Rizzoli, 1991.
- (with Stefano Borsi) Paolo Uccello. Translated from the Italian by Elfreda Powell. New York, N.Y.: H.N. Abrams, 1994.
- Architecture and Utopia. Translated by Deke Dusinberre. Hazan Editeur, 1997.
