= The Transformed Dream =

1913 painting by Giorgio de Chirico

- Artist: Giorgio de Chirico
- Year: 1913
- Medium: Oil on canvas
- Dimensions: 63 cm × 125 cm (25 in × 49 in)
- Location: Saint Louis Art Museum, St. Louis

The Transformed Dream is an oil on canvas painting by the Italian metaphysical painter Giorgio de Chirico, from 1913. It is held at the Saint Louis Art Museum, in St. Louis.

This work contains the classic Chirico's images of an empty urban scene at late evening with a ghostly train on the horizon. In this case in the foreground is an arrangement of a sort of still life with bananas, pineapples and, at the left, a sculpture of the head of the Roman god Jupiter.
