= Miltiadis Papanikolaou =

- Born: 1947 (age 78–79); Grevena, Greece
- Education: Aristotle University of Thessaloniki, LMU Munich
- Known for: Costakis Collection at the State Museum of Contemporary Art in Thessaloniki, Research on the artistic/historical murals of the Greek Parliament
- Scientific career
- Fields: History of Art, Greek and European Art of 19th and 20th Century.
- Workplaces: Aristotle University of Thessaloniki

Miltiadis Papanikolaou (Greek: Μιλτιάδης Παπανικολάου), (born in the 1940s in Grevena, northern Greece), also known as Papanicolaou, is a full Professor of History of Arts at the Philosophy department of the Aristotle University of Thessaloniki.

Papanikolaou was, from its inception in 1997 and until 2006, the Director of the State Museum of Contemporary Arts (SMCA) in Thessaloniki, Greece. During his position at the SMCA, Papanikolaou was the supervisor of the renowned Costakis collection, part of which is exposed at the Museum. He studied in universities in both Greece and Germany and published numerous books and reviews on contemporary art issues. He represented Greece in many international congresses and exhibitions in all over the world.

Papanikolaou was a candidate for the position of Vice-Chancellor during the internal elections at the Aristotle University of Thessaloniki in 2006.
