= Metaphysical painting =

Italian art style

The Disquieting Muses by Giorgio de Chirico, 1947

Metaphysical painting (Italian: pittura metafisica) or metaphysical art was a style of painting developed by the Italian artists Giorgio de Chirico and Carlo Carrà. The movement began in 1910 with de Chirico, whose dreamlike works with sharp contrasts of light and shadow often had a vaguely threatening, mysterious quality, "painting that which cannot be seen". De Chirico, his younger brother Alberto Savinio, and Carrà formally established the school and its principles in 1917.

== Development ==
The Song of Love by Giorgio de Chirico, 1914

Giorgio de Chirico, unlike many artists of his generation, found little to admire in the works of Cézanne and other French modernists, but was inspired by the paintings of the Swiss Symbolist Arnold Böcklin and the work of German artists such as Max Klinger. His painting The Enigma of an Autumn Afternoon (c. 1910) is considered his first Metaphysical work; it was inspired by what de Chirico called a "revelation" that he experienced in Piazza Santa Croce in Florence. In subsequent works he developed disquieting images of deserted squares, often bordered by steeply receding arcades shown in a raking light. Tiny figures in the distance cast long shadows, or in place of figures there are featureless dressmakers' mannequins. The effect produces a sense of dislocation in time and space.

In 1913, Guillaume Apollinaire made the first use of the term "metaphysical" to describe de Chirico's paintings.

Carlo Carrà, 1918, L'Ovale delle Apparizioni (The Oval of Apparition), oil on canvas, 92 × 60 cm, Galleria Nazionale d'Arte Moderna, Rome

In February 1917, the Futurist painter Carlo Carrà met de Chirico in Ferrara, where they were both stationed during World War I. Carrà developed a variant of the Metaphysical style in which the dynamism of his earlier work was replaced by immobility, and the two artists worked together for several months in 1917 at a military hospital in Ferrara. According to art historian Jennifer Mundy, "Carrà adopted de Chirico's imagery of mannequins set in claustrophobic spaces, but his works lacked de Chirico's sense of irony and enigma, and he always retained a correct perspective". After an exhibition of Carrà's work in Milan in December 1917, critics began to write of Carrà as the inventor of Metaphysical painting, to de Chirico's chagrin. Carrà did little to dispel this idea in Pittura Metafisica, a book he published in 1919, and the relationship between the two artists ended. By 1919, both artists had largely abandoned the style in favor of Neoclassicism.

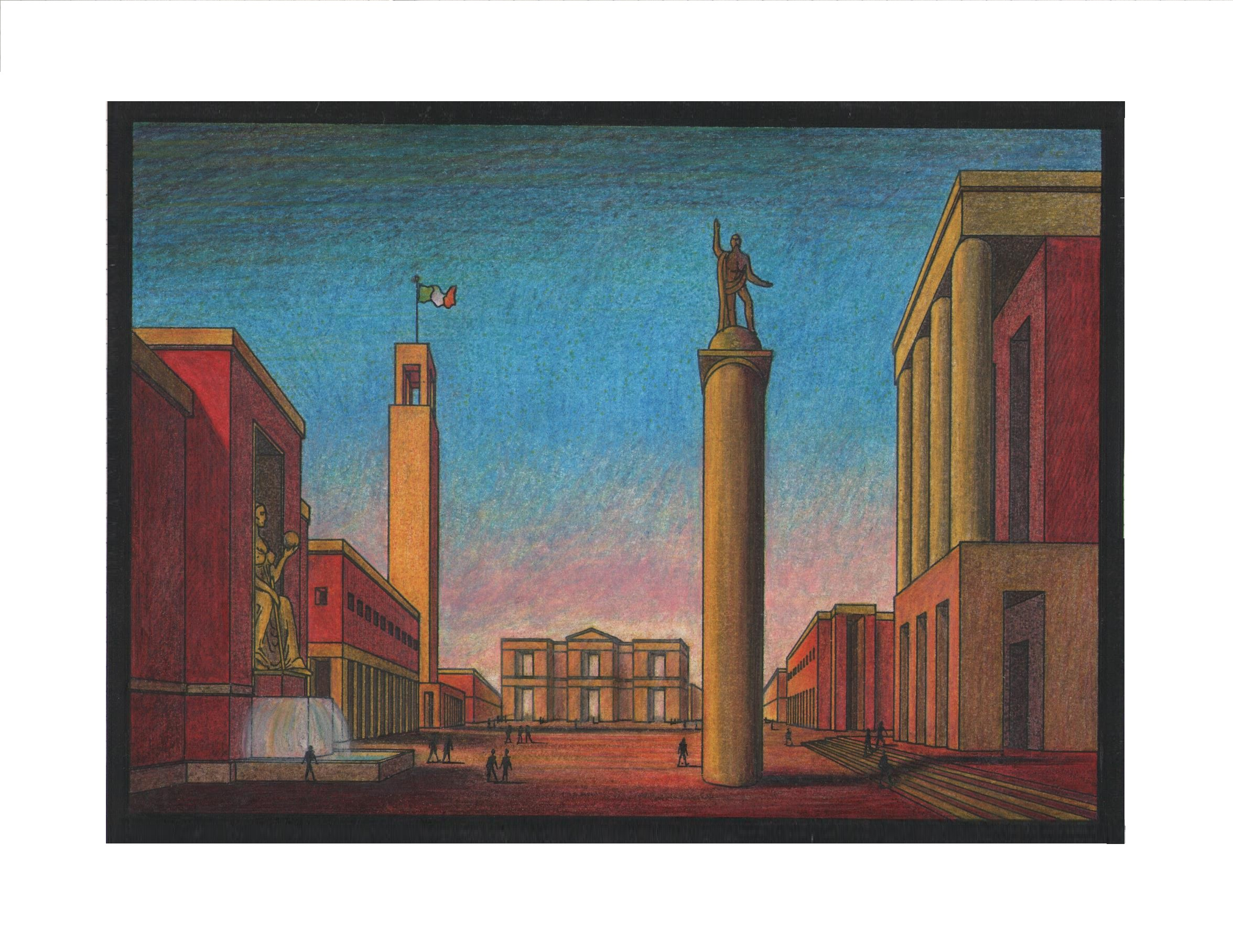
Arnaldo dell'Ira, Piazza d'Italia, 1934

Other painters who adopted the style included Giorgio Morandi around 1917–1920, Filippo de Pisis, and Mario Sironi. In the 1920s and later, the legacy of Metaphysical painting influenced the work of Felice Casorati, Max Ernst, and others. Exhibitions of Metaphysical art in Germany in 1921 and 1924 inspired the use of mannequin imagery in works by George Grosz and Oskar Schlemmer. Many paintings by René Magritte, Salvador Dalí, and other Surrealists make use of formal and thematic elements derived from Metaphysical painting.

Between the two World Wars in Italy there were numerous architectural vulgarisations of the metaphysical poetics of the "Piazza d'Italia", whose timeless atmosphere seemed to be congenial to the propaganda needs of the time. Squares of metaphysical flavor were built in the historical centers, as in Brescia or Varese, or in newly founded cities, such as those of the Agro Pontino (Sabaudia, Aprilia), to culminate in the spectacular unfinished EUR in Rome.
