= 1916 in art =

Events from the year 1916 in art.

== Events ==
- February 5 – Cabaret Voltaire is opened by German poet Hugo Ball and his future wife Emmy Hennings in the back room of Ephraim Jan's Holländische Meierei in Zürich; although surviving only until the summer it is pivotal in the creation of Dada. Those who gather here include Marcel Janco, Richard Huelsenbeck, Tristan Tzara, Sophie Taeuber-Arp and Jean Arp.
- February 9 : 6.00 p.m. – Tristan Tzara "founds" Dada (according to Hans Arp).
- March 1 – Liljevalchs konsthall inaugurated in Stockholm.
- May 20 – Boy with Baby Carriage is Norman Rockwell's first cover for The Saturday Evening Post.
- May 1 – The Royal Academy Exhibition of 1916 opens at Burlington House in London
- May – Muirhead Bone recruited as a war artist by the British War Propaganda Bureau. At the end of the year, his album of drawings The Western Front begins publication.
- June 16 – Cleveland Museum of Art opens in the United States.
- July 14 – Hugo Ball recites the Dada manifesto in Zürich.
- Summer – Paul Strand experiments with 'straight' abstract photography at Twin Lakes (Connecticut).
- August 31 – Kestnergesellschaft founded in Hanover, Germany.
- September 19 – Edvard Munch's paintings for the Aula (festival hall) of Det Kongelige Frederiks Universitet, Christiania, are inaugurated.
- September 26 – C. R. W. Nevinson's first major single-artist exhibition opens in London.
- November – John Nash arrives with the Artists Rifles in France.
- Vanessa Bell's first single-artist exhibition is staged at Omega Workshops in London.
- Provincial Fine Arts Museum completed in Córdoba, Argentina.
- Gilbert Cannan publishes his novel Mendel: a story of youth, based on the lives of those in his artistic circle of friends with a young Mark Gertler as the central figure, together with Dora Carrington, C. R. W. Nevinson and John Currie.
- Ezra Pound publishes Gaudier-Brzeska: A Memoir.

== Works ==
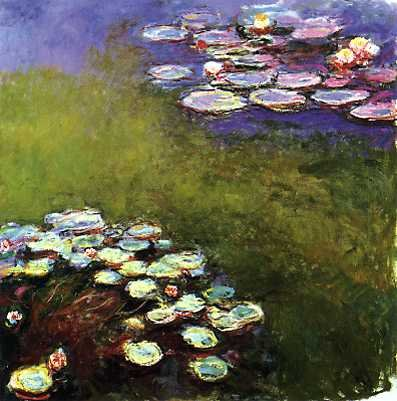
Claude Monet, Nympheas, Musée Marmottan Monet, 1916

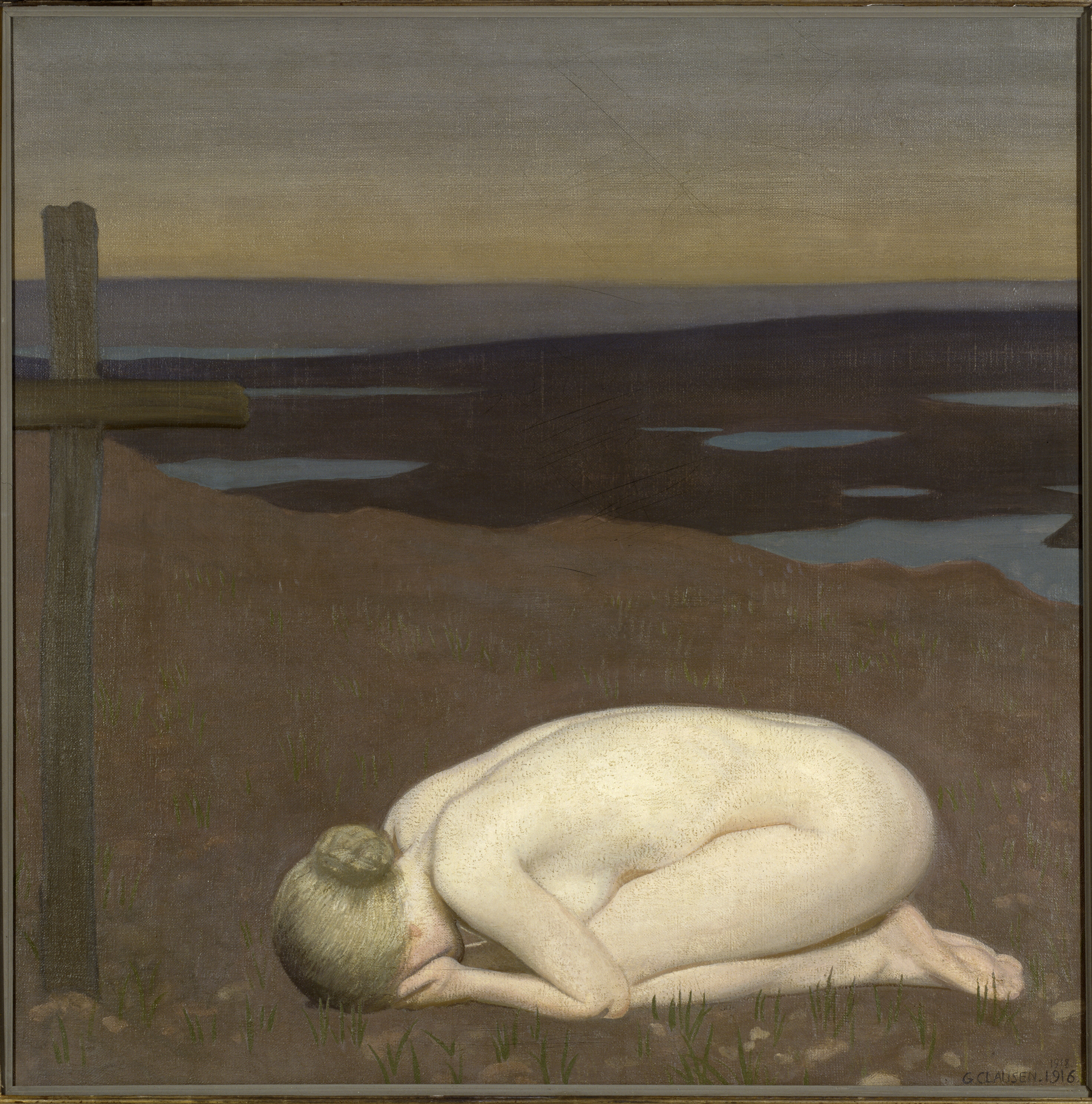
Youth Mourning by George Clausen. Allegorical commemoration of fallen British soldiers during war.

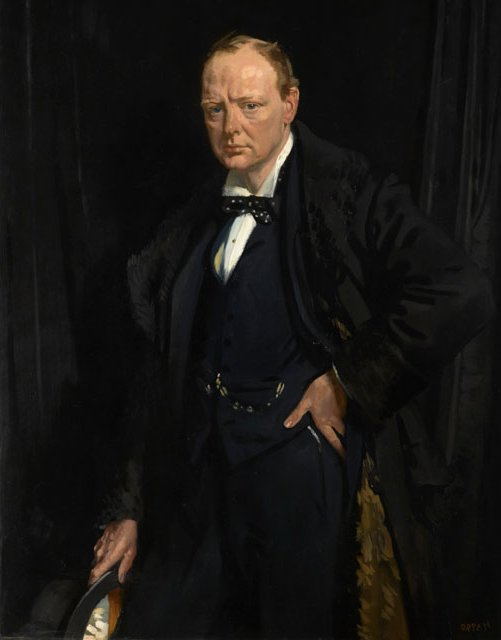
Portrait of Winston Churchill by William Orpen

- Paul Wayland Bartlett – Apotheosis of Democracy (pediment sculpture on United States Capitol)
- Vanessa Bell – Nude with Poppies
- Umberto Boccioni – Portrait of Ferruccio Busoni
- Constantin Brâncuși – Princess X (sculpture)
- Frank Brangwyn – Mosaic for apse of St Aidan's Church, Leeds, England
- George Clausen – Youth Mourning
- Giorgio de Chirico
  - The Disquieting Muses
  - The Melancholy of Departure
  - Metaphysical Interior with Biscuits
- Marcel Duchamp – Apolinère Enameled (approximate date)
- Jacob Epstein – The Tin Hat (bronze head)
- Abel Faivre – On les aura! (recruiting poster)
- Paul Gustav Fischer – Sunbathing in the Dunes
- Mark Gertler
  - Gilbert Cannan at his Mill
  - Merry-Go-Round
- J. W. Godward
  - Ancient Pastimes
  - By The Blue Ionian Sea
  - Lesbia With Her Sparrow
- George Grosz – Suicide
- Richard Jack – The Return to the Front: Victoria Railway Station
- Ernst Ludwig Kirchner – Königstein Station
- Gustav Klimt - Portrait of Elisabeth Lederer (completed)
- Laura Knight – Spring (original version)
- Boris Kustodiev
  - Fontanka
  - Shrovetide (Масленица)

Jean Metzinger, 1916, Femme au miroir (Lady at her Dressing Table), oil on canvas, 92.4 x 65.1 cm, private collection

- Alfred Laliberté – Les petits Baigneurs (bronze, Montreal)
- Fernand Léger – Soldier with a Pipe
- Wilhelm Lehmbruck – The Fallen (sculpture)
- Kazimir Malevich – Suprematist Composition
- Edward Middleton Manigault
  - Still Life with Lemons
  - Vorticist Landscape (War Impressions) (approximate date)
- Henri Matisse – The Piano Lesson
- Jean Metzinger
  - Femme au miroir (Femme à sa toilette, Lady at her Dressing Table)
  - Fruit and a Jug on a Table
- Amedeo Modigliani
  - portrait of Beatrice Hastings
  - Léon Indenbaum
  - portrait of Max Jacob
  - Jacques and Berthe Lipchitz
  - two portraits of Chaïm Soutine
  - Reclining Nude
  - Reclining Nude on Blue Cushion
  - Seated Nude (1916)
- Claude Monet – paintings in Water Lilies series
  - Nympheas (Musée Marmottan Monet)
  - Water Lilies (Museum of Fine Arts, Boston)
- C. R. W. Nevinson
  - Archies
  - The Doctor
  - Dog Tired
  - French Troops Resting
  - Ypres After the First Bombardment
- William Orpen – Portrait of Winston Churchill
- Maxfield Parrish and Louis Comfort Tiffany – The Dream Garden (glass mosaic) commissioned for and installed in the lobby of the Curtis Center in Philadelphia, Pennsylvania
- Glyn Philpot
  - Man in a Flying Jacket
  - The Skyscraper
- Morton Livingston Schamberg – Untitled (Mechanical Abstraction)
- Matthew Smith – Fitzroy Street Nude No. 1
- Paul Strand (photographs)
  - Abstraction, Porch Shadows, Twin Lakes, Connecticut
  - White Fence

== Births ==
- January 23 – David Douglas Duncan, American war photographer (died 2018)
- April 11 – Irv Novick, American comic book artist (died 2004)
- April 20 – Gerald Dillon, Irish painter (died 1971)
- April 26
  - Eyvind Earle, American illustrator and Disney artist (died 2000)
  - Werner Bischof, Swiss photographer and photojournalist (died 1954)
- June 21 – Tchan Fou-li, Hong Kong photographer (died 2018)
- June 24 – Saloua Raouda Choucair, Lebanese painter and sculptor (died 2017)
- July 7 – Werner G. Scharff, German-born American arts patron and fashion designer (died 2006)
- July 25 – Fred Lasswell, American cartoonist (died 2001)
- August 13 – Sybren Valkema, Dutch glass artist, founder of the European Studio Glass Movement. (died 1996)
- September 29 – Carl Giles, English cartoonist (died 1995)
- November 3 – Harry Lampert, American cartoonist, advertising artist and author (died 2004)
- November 10 – Louis le Brocquy, Irish painter (died 2012)
- November 25 – Villu Toots, Estonian calligrapher, book designer, educator, paleograph and author (died 1993)
- December 7 – John G. Morris, American picture editor (died 2017)
- December 26 – Helga Sonck-Majewski, Finnish artist (died 2015)

== Deaths ==
- January 17 – Marie Bracquemond, French Impressionist painter (born 1840)
- February 13 – Vilhelm Hammershøi, Danish painter (born 1864)
- March 4 – Franz Marc, German Expressionist painter (born 1880) (killed in action during Battle of Verdun)
- June 25 – Thomas Eakins, American painter, sculptor and teacher (born 1844)
- June 29 – Georges Lacombe, French artist (born 1868)
- July 6 – Odilon Redon, French Symbolist painter and graphic artist (born 1840)
- July 29 – Eleanor Vere Boyle, English watercolorist (born 1825)
- August 17 – Umberto Boccioni, Italian Futurist painter and sculptor (born 1882) (died following a fall during cavalry training)
- August 23 – Jean-Paul Aubé, French sculptor (born 1837)
- August 28 – Henri Harpignies, French landscape painter of the Barbizon school (born 1819)
- October 25 – William Merritt Chase, American Impressionist painter (born 1849)
- December 13 – Antonin Mercié, French sculptor and painter (born 1845)
- date unknown
  - Wu Shixian, Chinese landscape painter during the Qing dynasty (born unknown)
  - Branko Radulović, Serbian painter (born 1885).
