= Qingyun =

Qing Yun, Qing-Yun, Qing-yun, Qingyun, may refer to:

== Places ==
- Qingyun County (simplified Chinese: 庆云县; traditional Chinese: 慶雲縣; pinyin: Qìngyún Xiàn), Dezhou, Shandong province, China
- Qingyun town (Chinese: 青云镇; pinyin: Qīngyún-zhèn), Linshu County, Shandong province, China
- Qīngyún Town (Chinese: 青云镇; pinyin: Qīngyún-zhèn), Wannian County, Jiangxi province, China
- Qingyun Town (Chinese: 青云镇; pinyin: Qīngyún-zhèn), Songpan County, Sichuan province, China
- Qingyun town (Chinese: 青云镇; pinyin: Qīngyún-zhèn), Pingchang County, Sichuan province, China
- Qingyun town (Chinese: 青云镇; pinyin: Qīngyún-zhèn), Yuyang District, Yulin, Shaanxi province, China
- Qingyun Village (Chinese: 青云村; pinyin: Qīngyún-cūn), Nanxi, Chongqing, China
- Qingyun Subdistrict (Chinese: 青云街道; pinyin: Qīngyún-jiēdào), Xintai county, Shandong province, China
- Qingyun subdistrict (Chinese: 青云街道; pinyin: Qīngyún-jiēdào), Panlong, Kunming, Yunnan province, China
- Qingyun subdistrict (Chinese: 青云街道; pinyin: Qīngyún-jiēdào), Linchuan, Fuzhou, Jiangxi province, China
- Qingyun subdistrict (Chinese: 庆云街道; pinyin: Qìngyún-jiēdào), Lusong, Zhuzhou, Hunan province, China
- Qingyun Community (Chinese: 青云社区; pinyin: Qīngyún-shèqū), Kuiying Subdistrict, Zhongshan, Dalian, Liaoning, China
- Mount Qingyun, Weifang, Shandong, China
- Qingyun Temple (disambiguation), any of several temples
- Qing Yun Resort (Chinese: 青云岩风景区; pinyin: Qīngyún yán fēngjǐng qū; lit. 'Qingyun Scenic Zone'), in Dahao, Shantou, Guangdong, China
- Qingyun Bridge, Xiguan Creek, Xiguan, Guangzhou, China

== People with the given name ==
- Qing-Yun Chen (Chinese: 陈庆云, romanized: Chén Qìngyún; 1929–2023), Chinese chemist
- Deng Qingyun (Chinese: 鄧青雲, romanized: Dèng Qīngyún, born 1947), Hongkonger-American chemist
- Huang Qingyun (Chinese: 黃慶雲; Wade–Giles: Huang Ch'ing-yün; Yue Chinese: Wong Hing-wan; 1920–2018), Hong Kong author
- Li Qingyun (simplified Chinese: 李清云; traditional Chinese: 李清雲; pinyin: Lǐ Qīngyún; died 1933), Chinese herbalist and martial artist who claimed to be born in 1736
- Liu Qingyun (Chinese: 刘清韵, romanized: Liú Qīngyùn; courtesy name: Guxiang; 1841–1900), Chinese playwright and poet
- Qingyun Ma (Chinese: 马清运; born 1965), Chinese architect
- Sun Qingyun (simplified Chinese: 孙清云; traditional Chinese: 孫清雲; pinyin: Sūn Qīngyún; born 1954), Chinese politician
- Wang Qingyun (disambiguation), any of several people with the surname "Wang" (王)
- Wu Qingyun (died 1916), Chinese painter
- Xiao Qingyun (Chinese: 蕭慶雲; Wade–Giles: Ching-Yuen Hsiao; 1900–1984), Chinese-American engineer and diplomat

=== Fictional characters ===
- Su Qing Yun, a fictional character from the TV show The Glittering Days
- Princess Qingyun, a fictional character from the TV show Can't Buy Me Love (2010 TV series)

== Groups, organizations ==
=== Fictional ===
- Qing Yun clan, a fictional martial clan from the TV show Swords of Legends
- Qing Yun Faction, a fictional group from the martial arts fantasy novel Zhu Xian (novel)
- Qing Yun Hall, a fictional group from the TV show Fighter of the Destiny

== Other uses ==
- Huawei Qingyun L540, a Chinese laptop computer
- qingyun (simplified Chinese: 庆云; traditional Chinese: 慶雲; pinyin: qìngyún), auspicious 5-colored clouds in traditional Chinese painting, a type of xiangyun (Auspicious clouds)
- Qing Yun, a fictional warship from the TV show Drawing Sword

== See also ==
- Qing (disambiguation)
- Yun (disambiguation)
