= Qingyun Temple =

Qingyun Temple, may refer to:

- Qingyun Temple (Guangdong) (simplified Chinese: 庆云寺; traditional Chinese: 慶雲寺; pinyin: Qìngyún Sì), in Zhaoqing, Guangdong, China
- Qing Yun Monastery (Chinese: 青云禅寺; pinyin: Qīngyún chán sì; lit. 'Qingyun Zen Temple'), in Dahao, Shantou, Guangdong, China
- Qingyun Temple (Shanghai) (simplified Chinese: 庆云寺; traditional Chinese: 慶雲寺; pinyin: Qìngyún Sì), in Pudong District of Shanghai, China
- Qingyun Temple (Jiangsu) (simplified Chinese: 庆云寺; traditional Chinese: 慶雲寺; pinyin: Qìngyún Sì), in Taixing, Jiangsu, China
- Jiufen Qingyun Temple (Chinese: 青雲殿; pinyin: Qīngyún Diàn), in Jiufen, Taiwan
- Qingyun Temple, Weishi County, in Kaifeng, Henan, China

== See also ==
- Qingyun
