= Werner Scharff (disambiguation) =

Werner Scharff (1912–1945) was a Jewish-German resistance activist.

Werner Scharff, or Scharf, may also refer to:

- Werner G. Scharff (1916–2006), American arts patron and fashion designer
- Werner Scharf (1905–1945), German actor
