= Yoon =

Yoon may refer to:

- Yoon (Korean name), the ninth most common Korean family name.
- Yoon, stage name of Shim Ja-yoon, member of K-Pop group STAYC.
- Yōon, a feature of the Japanese language.
- Prabda Yoon (born 1973), a Thai novelist.
- Yoon Suk Yeol, the 20th president of South Korea.

== See also ==
- Yun (disambiguation)
