= Wang Qingyun =

Qingyun Wang or Wang Qing-yun or Qing-Yun Wang or Wang Qing Yun or Qing Yun Wang or variation, is a Chinese name.

People with this name include:

== Persons ==
- Wang Qingyun (skater) (王青雲, born 1983), Chinese figure skater, bronze medalist at the 1998 and 2002 Chinese Figure Skating Championships
- Wang Qingyun (王擎云), paraskier who competed for China at the 2022 Winter Paralympics
- Wang Qingyun (Northern Wei) (王慶雲, 6th century), Chinese rebel leader who rebelled against Emperor Xiaozhuang of Northern Wei and fought general Erzhu Tianguang,
- Wang Qingyun (Qing Dynasty) (王慶雲; 1798-1862), Chinese bureaucrat, ancestor of Wang Shizhen (physician); who was Viceroy of Sichuan and Viceroy of Liangguang
- Wang Qingyun (王青云), Chinese bureaucrat, 21st century political commissar at the Zhengzhou Joint Logistics Support Center

== Characters ==
- Wang Qingyun (王青雲) a fictional character from the TV show The Unforgettable Memory

== See also ==
- Wang (disambiguation)
- Qing (disambiguation)
- Yun (disambiguation)
- Qingyun
