= Yunzhou =

Yunzhou or Yun Zhou may refer to:

- Yunzhou Township, a town in Chicheng County, Hebei, China
- Yunzhou (modern Shanxi), a prefecture between the 7th and 11th centuries in modern Shanxi, China
- Yunzhou (modern Shandong), a prefecture between the 6th and 12th centuries in modern Shandong, China

== See also ==
- Zhou Yun (actress) (born 1978), Chinese actress surnamed Zhou
- Zhou Yun (footballer) (born 1990), Chinese footballer surnamed Zhou
- Yun (disambiguation)
- Zhou (disambiguation)
