= Zhong'anlun Monument =

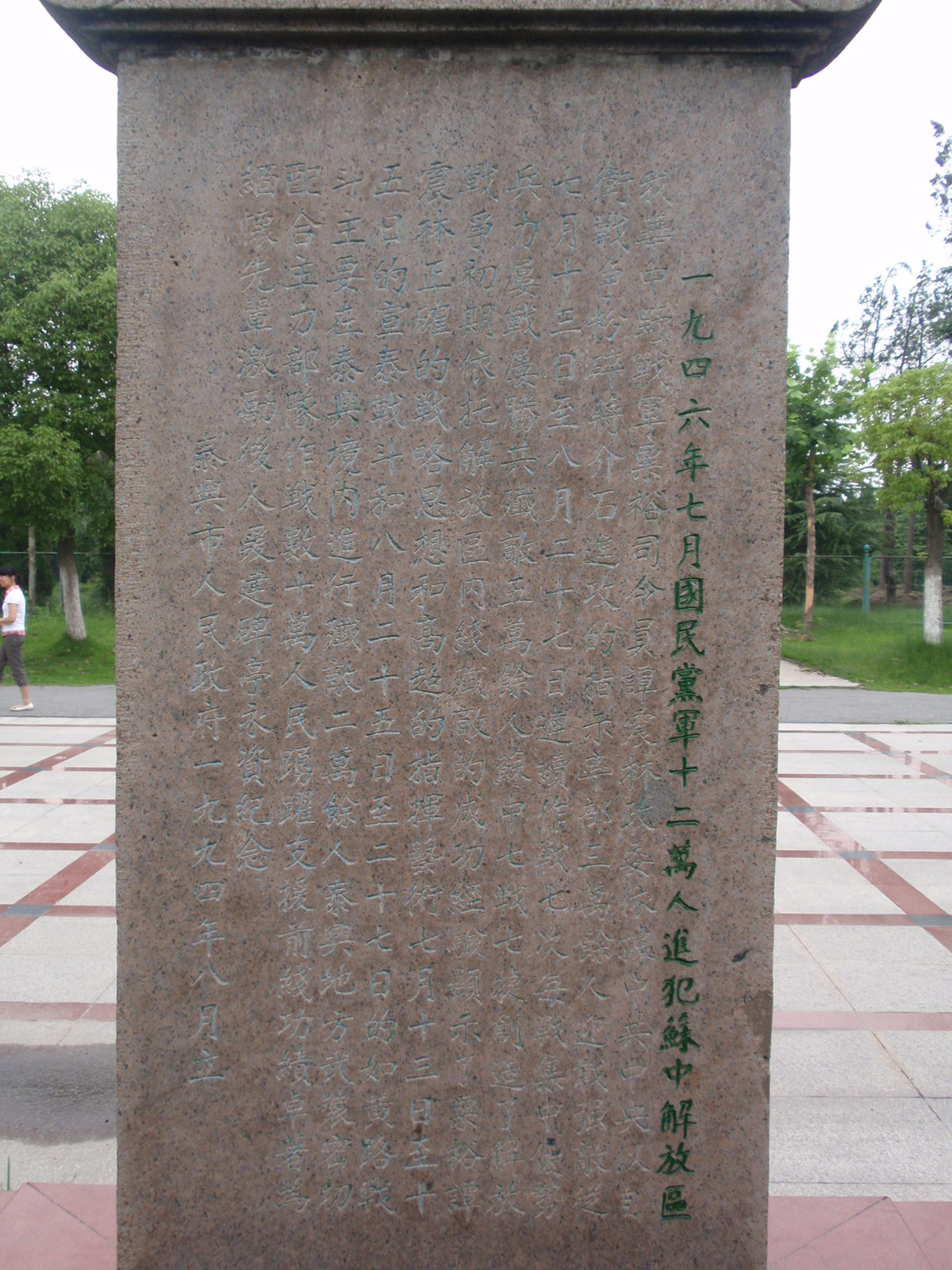

Zhong'anlun Monument (Chinese: 中安轮遇难烈士纪念馆) is a memorial monument dedicated to the victims of the Yangtze ferry disaster that occurred in October 1945, during the Chinese Civil War. Opened in October 1987, it is located in the Taixing Park on the north side of Taixing City in Taizhou, Jiangsu province.

== History ==
On 15 October 1945, about one thousand people boarded the ferry Zhong'anlun (中安轮) for a crossing of the Yangtze River from Wujin County to Taixing City, on orders that came from the Communist Party. The ferry sank about 2 km south of Taixing, resulting in the deaths of 800 people.

Four decades later, the Jiangsu provincial government built a monument to commemorate the victims of the disaster. On 15 October 1987, the day of the 42nd anniversary of the ferry sinking, the Zhong'anlun Memorial was officially opened to the public.

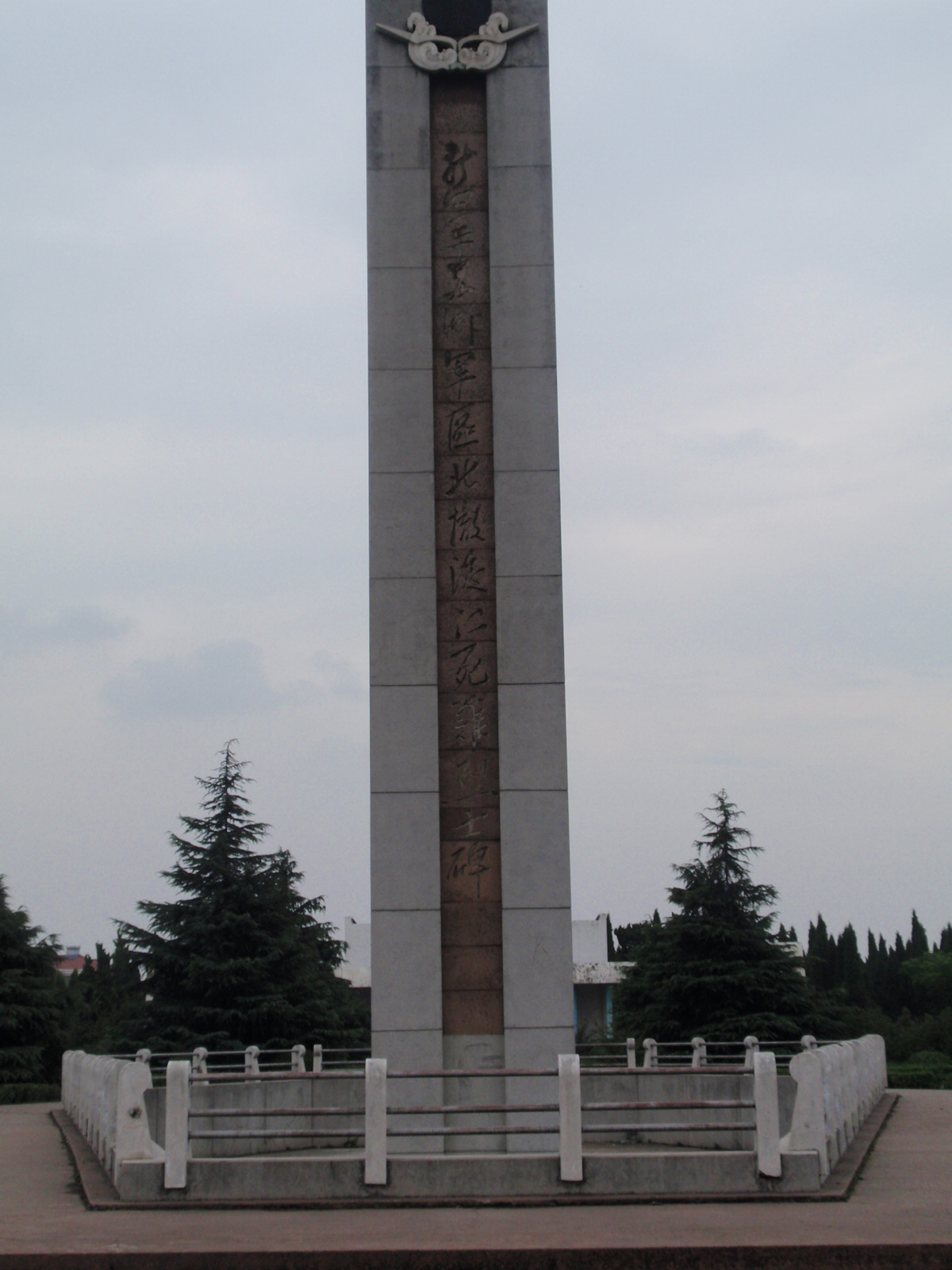

== Monuments ==
The environment of the memorial hall is beautiful and solemn with many hemlocks and other plants. The first scene in the memorial is a horizontal monument 6.4 m wide; the front of the monument carries a vigorous and forceful inscription of eight Chinese characters: 烈士英灵,永镇江海("The heroic spirit of the martyrs will abide forever, as long as the river [flows into] the sea"), by General Ye Fei. On the back of the monument is an inscriptions in honor of those martyrs.

Another monument at the site is a magnificent stone stele, 18.8 m high, with the inscription "Monument to the martyrs of the New Fourth Army's Jiangsu-Zhejiang Military Region who perished while crossing the river during their retreat to the north" (新四军苏浙军区北撤渡江死难烈士碑)", also written by Ye Fei. The base of monument resembles a sinking boat, to make a metaphor of the cause of martyrs' death. The side of the monument looks like a leaping spray, symbolizing the revolutionary spirit of the martyrs that can be eternal as long as the Yangtze River, from generation to generation.

== Exhibition room ==
The exhibition room is the most important part of the memorial, and it is divided into three parts. They are "Suzhe Military Region, great achievements", "the great fame of martyrs, and the hopeful future of generation" and "inherit tradition, carry forward". There are many historical photos and biographies of martyrs are displayed here, including 63 photos, five charts and four entities. Their heroic deeds are admired by many tourists every year, especially in the Tomb Sweeping Day. Those materials are divided into two parts according to Military Regions, Jiangsu province and Zhejiang province.

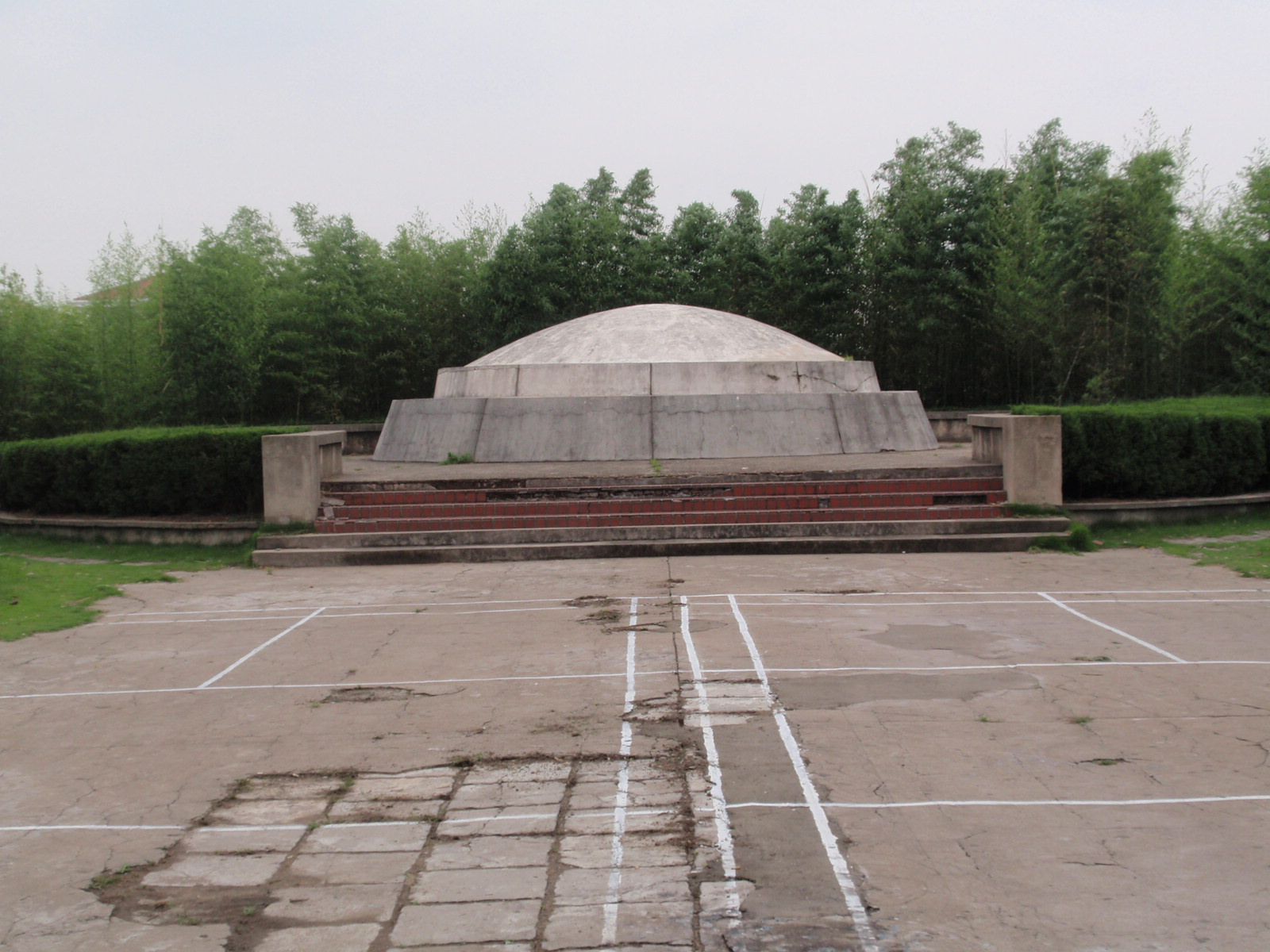

== Graveyard ==
The graveyard is located out of the showroom, and there are 800 martyrs buried in the cemetery. It looks like a round bed, and it covers an area of 98 square meters with 2.5 meters' diameter. The graveyard is surrounded by many hemlocks, which makes the phenomenon very solemn.
