= Taixing =

Taixing 泰兴市 Taihing
- County-level & Sub-prefectural city
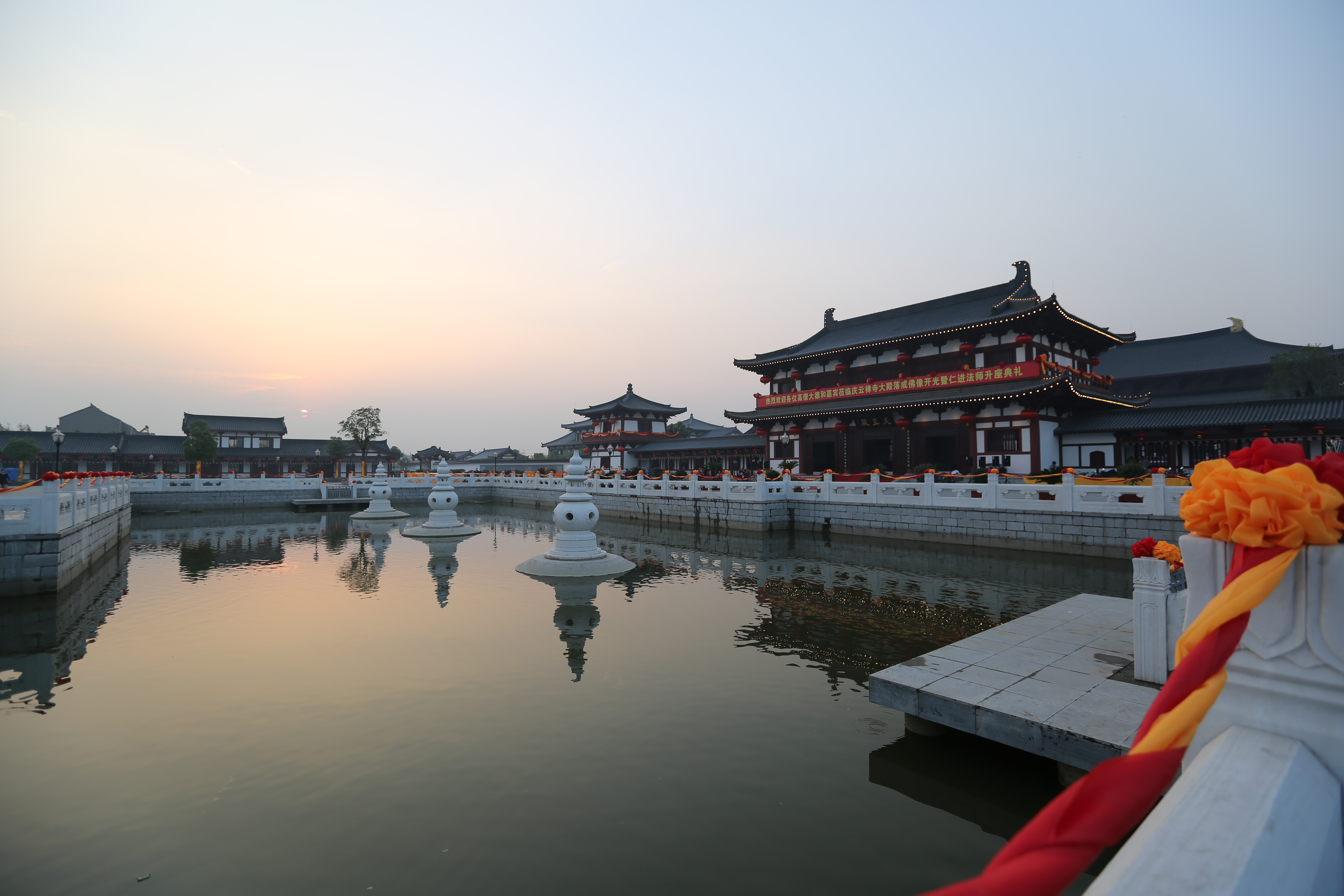
- Qingyun Temple

- Location in Jiangsu
- Coordinates: 32°09′32″N 120°01′44″E
- Country: People's Republic of China
- Province: Jiangsu
- Prefecture-level city: Taizhou

Area (2008)
  - Total: 1,172 km^{2} (453 sq mi)

Population (2020)
  - Total: 994,445
  - Density: 848.5/km^{2} (2,198/sq mi)
- Time zone: UTC+8 (China Standard)
- Postal code: 225400

Taixing (simplified Chinese: 泰兴; traditional Chinese: 泰興; pinyin: Tàixīng) is a county-level city under the administration of Taizhou, Jiangsu province, China. It is located in the Yangtze River Delta, bordering the prefecture-level cities of Nantong to the east, Changzhou to the southwest, and Zhenjiang to the west.

== History ==
The southern Hailin county was taken away to create Taixing in 938, administered by Taizhou. It was under the jurisdiction of Yangzhou during the era of Yuan and Ming, but was transferred to Tongzhou later. It was returned to Yangzhou in 1953, and became a county-level city in 1992. It was transferred to Taizhou in 1996.

== Administrative divisions ==
At present, Taixing City has one subdistrict, 14 towns, and one township.

1 subdistrict

- Jichuan (济川街道)

14 towns

- Huangqiao (黄桥镇)
- Fenjie (分界镇)
- Guxi (古溪镇)
- Yuanzhu (元竹镇)
- Shanhu (珊瑚镇)
- Guangling (广陵镇)
- Quxia (曲霞镇)
- Zhangqiao (张桥镇)
- Heshi (河失镇)
- Xinjie (新街镇)
- Yaowang (姚王镇)
- Xuanbao (宣堡镇)
- Hongqiao (虹桥镇)
- Binjiang (滨江镇)

1 township

- Gensi (根思乡)

== Climate ==
Climate data for Taixing, elevation 6 m (20 ft), (1991–2020 normals, extremes 1981–present)
Month	Jan	Feb	Mar	Apr	May	Jun	Jul	Aug	Sep	Oct	Nov	Dec	Year
Record high °C (°F)	21.1 (70.0)	26.2 (79.2)	33.1 (91.6)	34.8 (94.6)	35.8 (96.4)	38.2 (100.8)	38.8 (101.8)	39.7 (103.5)	37.9 (100.2)	32.2 (90.0)	28.6 (83.5)	22.4 (72.3)	39.7 (103.5)
Mean daily maximum °C (°F)	7.4 (45.3)	9.5 (49.1)	15.3 (59.5)	21.6 (70.9)	26.5 (79.7)	28.9 (84.0)	32.4 (90.3)	32.5 (90.5)	27.7 (81.9)	22.6 (72.7)	16.8 (62.2)	9.7 (49.5)	20.9 (69.6)
Daily mean °C (°F)	3.6 (38.5)	5.2 (41.4)	10.2 (50.4)	16.0 (60.8)	21.3 (70.3)	24.6 (76.3)	28.4 (83.1)	28.3 (82.9)	23.6 (74.5)	18.2 (64.8)	12.5 (54.5)	5.6 (42.1)	16.5 (61.6)
Mean daily minimum °C (°F)	0.7 (33.3)	1.8 (35.2)	6.1 (43.0)	11.3 (52.3)	17.0 (62.6)	21.2 (70.2)	25.3 (77.5)	25.2 (77.4)	20.4 (68.7)	14.7 (58.5)	9.1 (48.4)	2.3 (36.1)	12.9 (55.3)
Record low °C (°F)	−9.8 (14.4)	−9.5 (14.9)	−5.6 (21.9)	0.3 (32.5)	6.8 (44.2)	12.3 (54.1)	17.3 (63.1)	17.2 (63.0)	9.9 (49.8)	1.6 (34.9)	−4.1 (24.6)	−10.7 (12.7)	−10.7 (12.7)
Average precipitation mm (inches)	53.6 (2.11)	50.5 (1.99)	73.3 (2.89)	69.4 (2.73)	86.8 (3.42)	176.2 (6.94)	179.1 (7.05)	162.0 (6.38)	85.8 (3.38)	54.2 (2.13)	53.3 (2.10)	36.5 (1.44)	1,080.7 (42.56)
Average precipitation days (≥ 0.1 mm)	9.1	9.0	10.3	9.9	10.2	11.6	13.0	11.9	8.2	7.0	8.0	7.3	115.5
Average snowy days	3.2	2.7	0.9	0.1	0	0	0	0	0	0	0.2	1.1	8.2
Average relative humidity (%)	73	73	72	71	71	77	80	80	78	73	74	71	74
Mean monthly sunshine hours	125.1	126.0	152.5	180.5	190.3	146.3	190.5	198.5	168.7	171.3	142.6	136.7	1,929
Percentage possible sunshine	39	40	41	46	44	35	44	49	46	49	46	44	44
Source: China Meteorological Administration all-time January high

== Notable people ==
- Ding Wenjiang (Geologist)
- Gao Hong (soccer player)
- Lu Wenfu (Writer)
- Wang Xiyu (tennis player)
- Yang Gensi (Soldier and war hero)
- Luna Yin (Singer)
- Huang Ming (Entrepreneur)

== See also ==
- Zhong'anlun Monument, to the victims of a ferry disaster
