= Suprematist Composition =

1916 painting by Kazimir Malevich

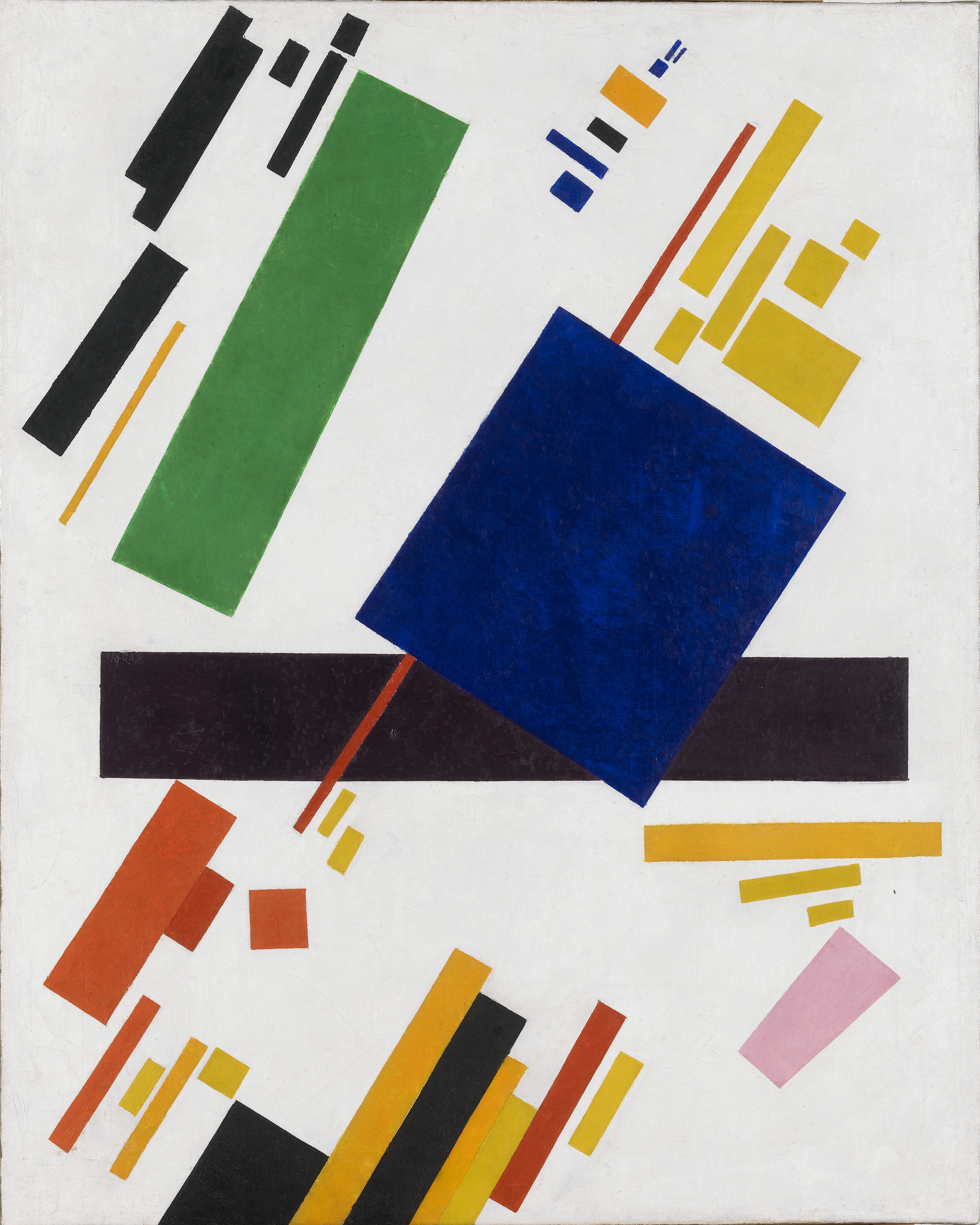
- Artist: Kazimir Malevich
- Year: 1916
- Medium: Oil on canvas
- Dimensions: 88.5 cm × 71 cm (34.8 in × 28 in)
- Location: Private collection

Suprematist Composition (Note: Russian: Супрематическая композиция.) (Blue Rectangle over the Red Beam) (Note: Russian: Синий прямоугольник поверх красного луча.) is a 1916 painting by Kazimir Malevich, a Russian painter of geometric abstraction.

The painting was created in 1916 and stayed with the artist until June 1927. Malevich exhibited his work in the Grosse Berliner Kunstausstellung in Berlin, but soon left for the Soviet Union. The painting came into the possession of German architect Hugo Häring, who sold it to the Stedelijk Museum Amsterdam, where it remained for the next 50 years. It was shown at various expositions, mostly in Europe.

After an extended legal battle over the painting's ownership, which endured for 17 years, the painting was returned to heirs of the artist. A few months later, in November 2008, the artist's heirs sold it at a Sotheby's auction for $60 million to the Nahmad family. In 2018, it was sold at a Christie's auction for $85.8 million with fees to art dealer Brett Gorvy. It was the highest price paid for a work in the history of Russian art.

== See also ==
- List of most expensive paintings
- 1916 in art
- Suprematism
- Supremus
