= Lu Wenfu =

Chinese writer

- Born: March 23, 1927; Taixing, Jiangsu, China
- Died: July 9, 2005 (aged 78); Suzhou, Jiangsu, China
- Occupations: novelist, essayist, critic
- Writing career
- Period: 1927--2005
- Notable works: Gourmet (美食家), A Dream Scene（梦中的天地 ）, Deep Within a Lane（小巷深处）

Lu Wenfu (Chinese: 陆文夫, March 23, 1927 – July 9, 2005) was a contemporary Chinese writer. He previously worked as a journalist and a magazine editor and served as president of the Jiangsu Writers' Association (zh:江蘇作家協會, 江苏作家协会) and vice president of the China Writers Association (zh:中國作家協會, 中国作家协会).

== Life ==
Lu Wenfu was born in 1927 in Taixing, Jiangsu province.

When Lu Wenfu was 6 years old, he went to an old-style school, where his teacher was impressed by his interest in reading and gave him the formal name Wenfu. During the Second Sino-Japanese War, Lu finished primary and secondary school in Taixing. In 1945 he went to live with relatives in Suzhou for recuperation and studied in Suzhou High School. After graduation, he was admitted into two universities in Shanghai. But his family couldn't afford the school tuition and other expenses. So, he transferred to the Subei Liberated Area, where he was assigned to Huazhong University to study Marxism.

After graduating from the Huazhong University in Yancheng, Lu took part in the Chinese Communist Revolution in northern Jiangsu. In 1949 he returned to Suzhou and became a reporter of New Suzhou Report (now renamed as Suzhou Daily). In 1955 he started the first period of his over 50 years' writing career. Two years later Lu became a member of Literary Federation of Jiangsu. In 1957 he joined Gao Xiaosheng (高晓声, 20th century author) and some others to found the magazine The Explorers (Tanqiuzhe, 探求者). It came under great attack by the Communist leadership, for what Lu was denounced as a Rightist during the Great Leap Forward. He was soon sentenced to a machine tool plant as an apprentice in Suzhou. During the three years as a mechanic, Lu was awarded the honor of "Excellent Apprentice", "Advanced Worker" and "Crackerjack at Technical Innovations". As a result, he was deemed reformed and was allowed to write again. Nevertheless, with the Cultural Revolution breaking out in 1966, Lu was denounced once again and was sent to the fields for reeducation through labor until 1976, which experience he later wrote of as a manual labour:"I was 'struggled against', forced to confess my crimes and paraded through the streets with a placard around my neck. I was already numb to the pain, and worried about when this disaster for my country would end." After the Cultural Revolution ended with Mao Zedong's death in 1976, Lu returned to Suzhou in November 1978, at the age of 50.

In December 1978, Lu became the managing editor of Suzhou magazine. It's during the Deng Xiaoping reform era that he started his second career as a writer. The works reflected on his memories of modern history:"Poverty, backwardness, hardship, chaos: these are not necessarily obstacles to literature. Material wealth is not the same as spiritual wealth."

Shortly after the novel Gourmet was published in 1988, Lu opened a restaurant, The Old Suzhou Gourmet House, serving Suzhou cuisine.

On July 9, 2005, Lu Wenfu died of emphysema, at the age of 78.

== Artistic value ==
In the field of contemporary public literary creations, Lu Wenfu represented the old generations of writers in their respective works, along with Fan Xiaoqing (the middle-aged generation) and Zhu Wenying (the younger generation). Lu Wenfu wrote about Suzhou from different perspectives, including political, cultural, economic, and personal, "representing some inner expressions left by literature that are best worth savoring in the historical process for Suzhou city."

Lu's success in portraying the traditions and customs of Suzhou won him a reputation of "urban root-seeker", an honour he shared with other writers such as Deng Youmei (zh:邓友梅), who wrote about the disappearing traditional culture of old Beijing.
