= Qing-Yun Chen =

Chinese chemist (1929–2023)

- 陈庆云
- Born: January 25, 1929; Yuanjiang, Hunan Province, Republic of China
- Died: March 2, 2023 (aged 94); Shanghai, China
- Education: Academy of Sciences of the Soviet Union
- Spouse: Zhi-Fen Yu (m. 1961)
- Awards: National Innovation Award; National Natural Science Award; Ho Leung Ho Lee (HLHL) Prize for Science and Technology Progress
- Scientific career
- Fields: Organofluorine chemistry
- Workplaces: Shanghai Institute of Organic Chemistry
- Doctoral advisor: Ivan Knunyants; N.P. Gambaryan
- Other academic advisors: Qi-Yi Xing

Qing-Yun Chen (Chinese: 陈庆云; pinyin: Chén Qìngyún; 25 January 1929 – 2 March 2023) was a Chinese organic chemist and member of the Chinese Academy of Sciences, specializing in the field of organic fluorine chemistry.

== Biography ==
Chen was born on January 25, 1929, in Yuanjiang, Hunan Province, into a family that was not particularly wealthy. His parents attached great importance to education and did their best to ensure that he received a formal education; in 1948, Chen was admitted to Peking University, from which he graduated four years later with a degree in chemistry.

After finishing his bachelor's degree in 1952, he joined the Instrumentation Hall of the Chinese Academy of Sciences (now known as Changchun Institute of Optics, Fine Mechanics and Physics of the Chinese Academy of Sciences) as a research assistant. In 1956, after passing the USSR entrance exam, he entered the Institute of Elemental Organic Compounds of the Academy of Sciences of the Soviet Union to obtain his master's degree. He received his Ph.D. in organofluorine chemistry in 1960 under the supervision of Ivan Knunyants and N. P. Gambaryan.

In 1960, after finishing his degree, he returned to China to study the development of fluorinated rubber, and in 1963, he was transferred to the Shanghai Institute of Organic Chemistry of the Chinese Academy of Sciences, where he continued the development of fluorinated rubber. Chen and colleagues found the chromate fog inhibitor F-53 and studied and synthesized a variety of chemicals. He then used this as a basis for a systematic study of single-electron transfer of fluoroalkyl halides. In 1993, he was elected as an academician of the Chinese Academy of Sciences. After 2000, Chen expanded his research interests to the synthesis and application of fluoroalkylated porphyrins. He developed two practical methods for the preparation of various fluoroalkylated porphyrins, the sulfinatodehalogenation reaction and the palladium-catalyzed cross-coupling reaction.

On March 2, 2023, he died at the age of 94 in Shanghai.

== Personal life ==
In 1961, Chen married Zhi-Fen Yu and they had a son and a daughter.
