= Royal Academy Exhibition of 1916 =

1916 art exhibition in London

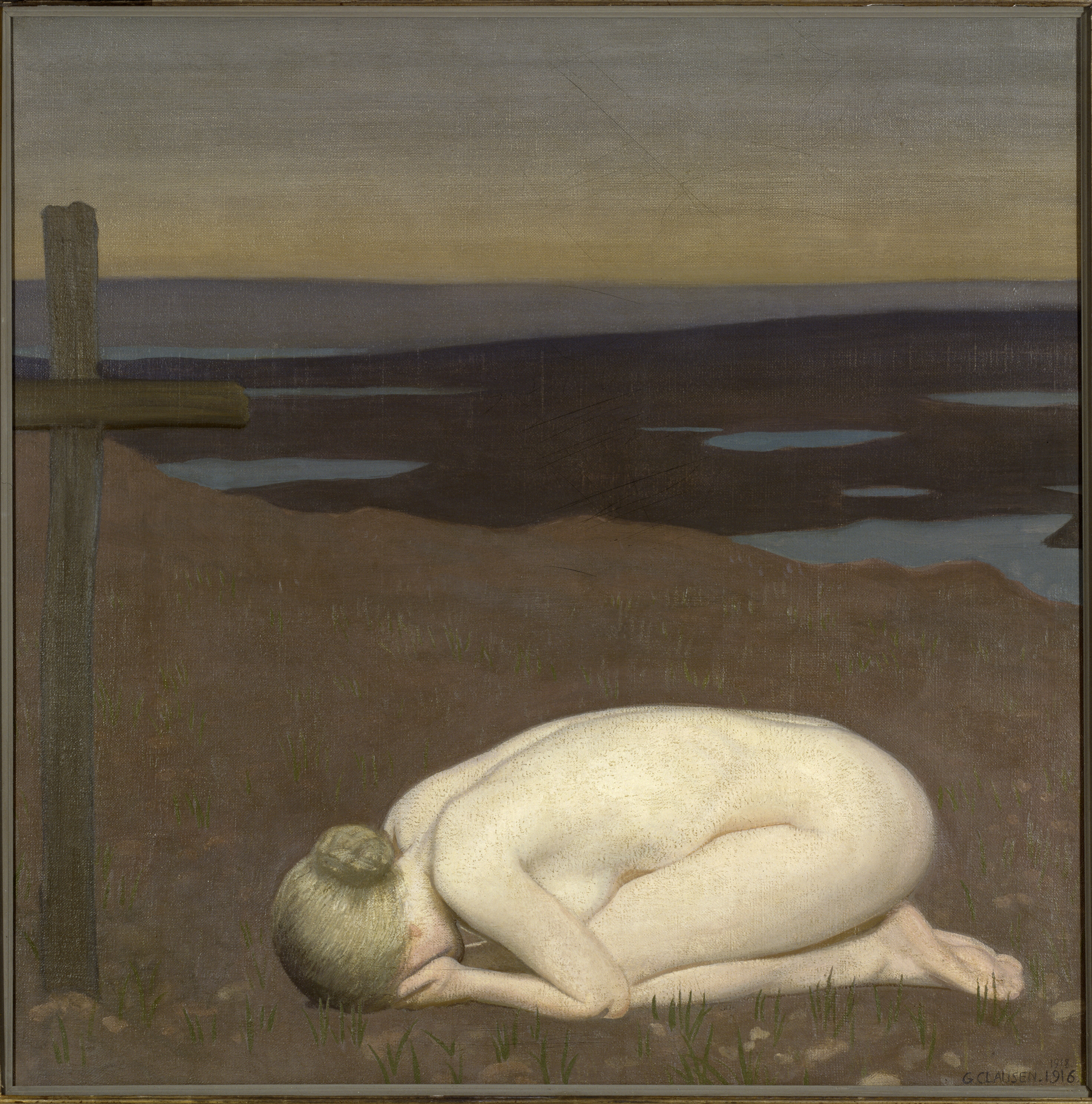
Youth Mourning by George Clausen

The Royal Academy Exhibition of 1916 was an art exhibition held in London by the British Royal Academy of Arts. It was the hundred and forty eighth annual Summer Exhibition and took place at Burlington House in Piccadilly from 1 May to 7 August 1916. It was held when the First World War was at its height and this was reflected in a number of works displayed.

One of the most notable paintings to be displayed was George Clausen's Youth Mourning. Clausen's daughter's fiancée had been killed in action on the Western Front the previous year. The painting represents the sense of loss of so many of the younger generation in their prime. While Clausen was traditionally known for his realist paintings, the work was more allegorical. It is now in the Imperial War Museum.

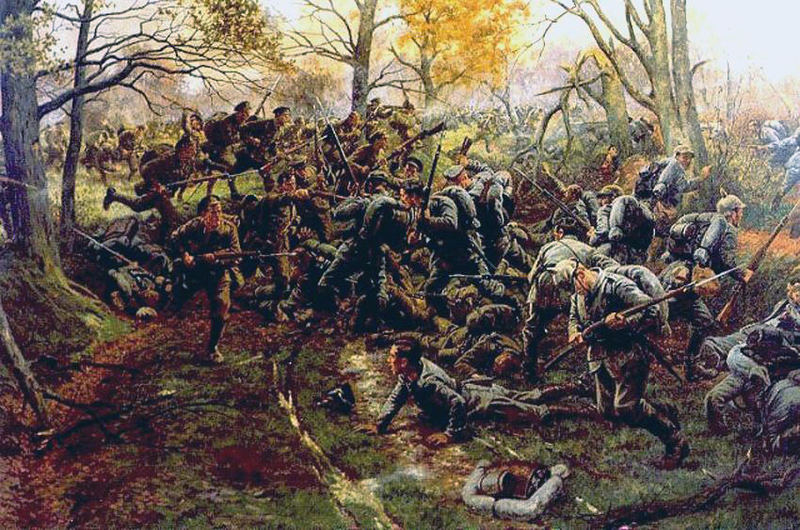
The Defeat of the Prussian Guard at Ypres by William Barnes Wollen

Other works on display concerning the war included William Barnes Wollen's depiction of the Battle of Ypres in 1914, William Lionel Wyllie's AD 1915. There were also many escapist works in the exhibition which did not reference the ongoing conflict. It was followed by the Royal Academy Exhibition of 1917 which continued the mix of war themes alongside other works that didn't explicitly reference it.

== Bibliography ==
- The Exhibition of the Royal Academy of Arts. Royal Academy, 1916.
