= French Troops Resting =

Painting by C.R.W. Nevinson

- Artist: C.R.W. Nevinson
- Year: 1916
- Type: Oil on canvas, war art
- Dimensions: 71.1 cm × 91.4 cm (28.0 in × 36.0 in)
- Location: Imperial War Museum, London

French Troops Resting is a 1916 oil painting by the British artist C.R.W. Nevinson. It shows exhausted French soldiers carrying full kilt and resting by a roadside during the First World War. Nevinson had been a leading member of the Futurist movement before the outbreak for war and carried this Modernist influence into much of his war art. He had also produced a drypoint etching under the same title, with a similar but different composition which he displayed at the Leicester Galleries in a one-man exhibition of his war work in Autumn 1916. The painting has been part of the collection of the Imperial War Museum in London since 1961.

== Bibliography ==
- Doherty, Charles Edward. Nash, Nevinson, and Roberts at War. University of Wisconsin, 1989.
- Ingleby, Richard. C.R.W. Nevinson: The Twentieth Century. Merrell Holberton, 1999.
- Tolson, Roger. Art from the First World War. Imperial War Museum, 2008.
- Walsh, Michael J.K. (ed.) Dilemma Of English Modernism: Visual and Verbal Politics in the Life and Work of C. R. W. Nevinson. Bloomsbury Academic, 2007.
