= Qingyun Temple (Jiangsu) =

Buddhist temple in Taixing, Jiangsu, China

- 庆云寺
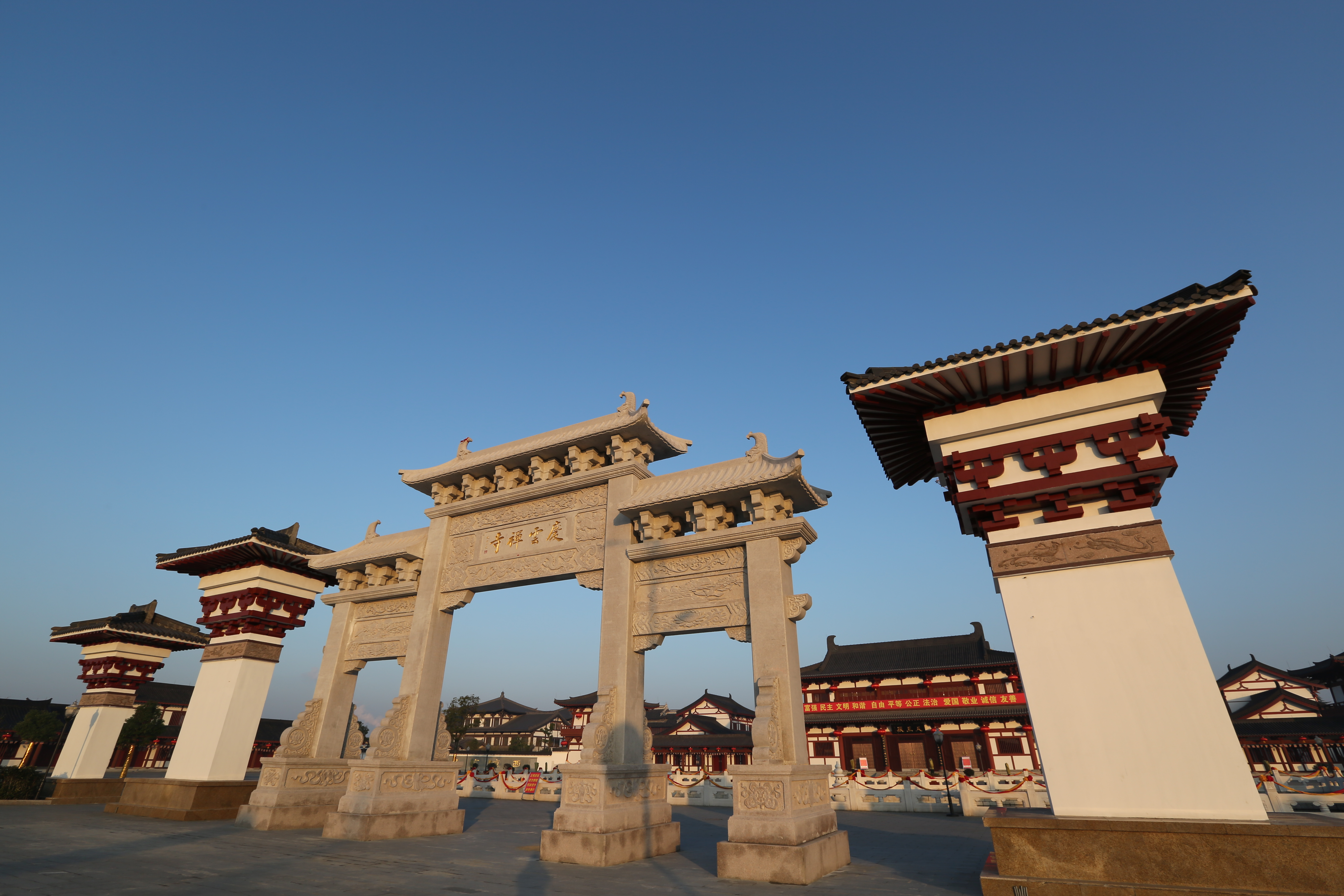
- The Paifang at Qingyun Temple.

- Location within Jiangsu Location within China

Religion
- Affiliation: Buddhism
- Deity: Chan Buddhism
- Leadership: Shi Renjin (释仁进)

Location
- Location: Taixing, Jiangsu
- Country: China
- Coordinates: 32°10′08″N 120°00′06″E

Architecture
- Style: Chinese architecture
- Founder: Cai Mengxiang (蔡梦祥)
- Established: 999
- Completed: 1986 (reconstruction)

Website
- www.qycscn.com

Qingyun Temple (simplified Chinese: 庆云寺; traditional Chinese: 慶雲寺; pinyin: Qìngyún Sì) is a Buddhist temple located in Taixing, Jiangsu, China.

== History ==
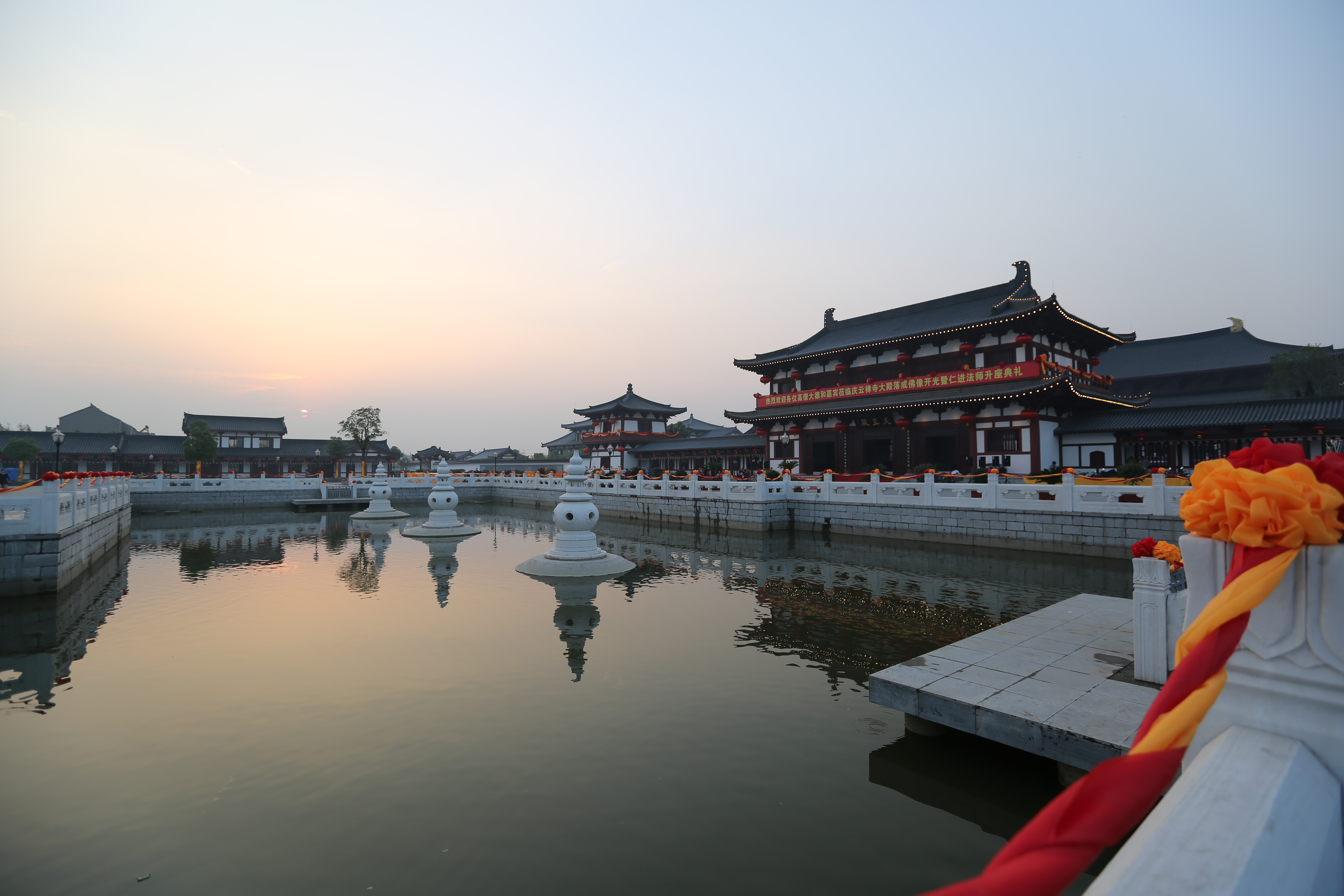
The Four Heavenly Kings Hall and Free Life Pond at Qingyun Temple.

=== Song dynasty ===
According to the Taixing County Annals, Qingyun Temple was originally built in 999, during the reign of Emperor Zhenzong of the Song dynasty (960–1279).

=== Ming dynasty ===
In the Jiajing period (1522–1566) of the Ming dynasty (1368–1644), Qingyun Temple was occupied by a gang of Taoist priests. Under the mediation of magistrate Duan Shangxiu (段尚绣), they gave back the temple to Buddhist monks in the Wanli period (1573–1620). In 1598, magistrate Chen Jichou (陈继畴) supervised the reconstruction of Qingyun Temple. Shanmen, Mahavira Hall, Meditation Hall, Dining Hall, Bell tower, Drum tower were gradually restored.

=== Qing dynasty ===
In the Shunzhi era (1644–1661) of the Qing dynasty (1644–1911), the Qing government inscribed and honored the name "Qingyun Chan Temple" (青云禅寺).

Qingyun Temple had reached unprecedented heyday in the Guangxu period (1875–1908). During that time, it has more than 110 halls and buildings, and included several hundred monks.

=== Republic of China ===
After the Second Sino-Japanese War broke out in 1940, Cai Xinyuan (蔡鑫元), a military officer of the Japanese puppet troops, seized the temple and used it as his headquarters.

In 1946, during the Chinese Civil War, Liu Guangyu (刘光宇), a military officer of the Kuomintang army, led his armies fight with the East China Field Army commander Su Yu in the temple.

=== People's Republic of China ===
In 1966, Mao Zedong launched the Cultural Revolution, Qingyun Temple was used as a reception center.

After the 3rd plenary session of the 11th Central Committee of the Chinese Communist Party, according to the national policy of free religious belief, the temple reactivated its religious activities. In 1986, the reconstruction project of the temple was launched. Qingyun Temple was officially reopened to the public in 1990.

== Architecture ==
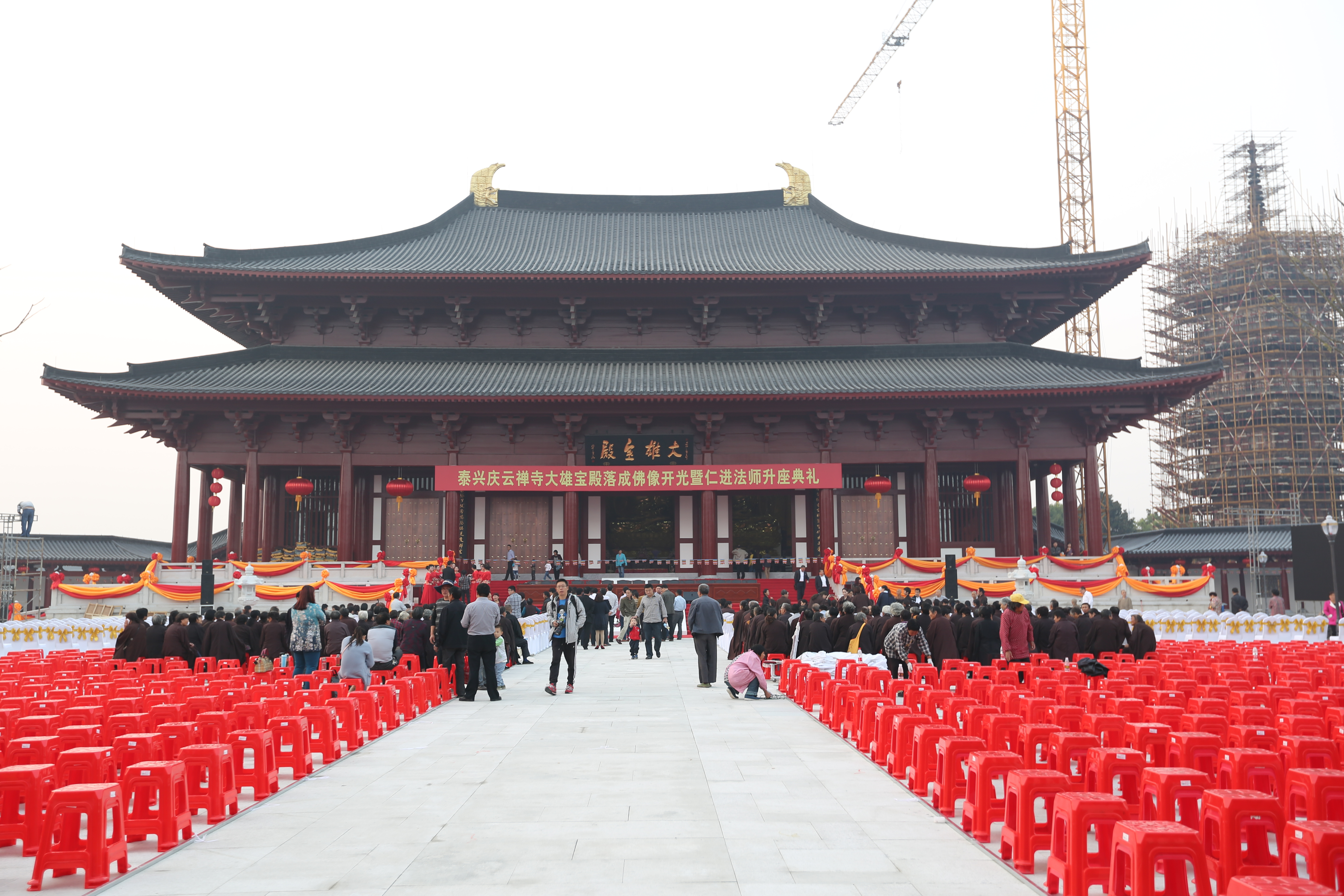
The Mahavira Hall at Qingyun Temple.

=== Shanmen ===
In the center of the eaves of the Shanmen is a plaque, on which there are the words "Qingyun Chan Temple" written by former Venerable Master of the Buddhist Association of China Zhao Puchu.

=== Hall of Four Heavenly Kings ===
Maitreya is enshrined in the Hall of Four Heavenly Kings and at the back of his statue is a statue of Skanda. Statues of Four Heavenly Kings are enshrined in the left and right side of the hall.

=== Mahavira Hall ===
The Mahavira Hall was recently established in 2015. It is the imitation Song-dynasty-style with double eaves hip roof (重檐庑殿顶). Statues of Sakyamuni, Amitabha and Bhaisajyaguru are enshrined in the hall. At the back of Sakyamuni's statue are statues of Guanyin, Longnü and Shancai. The statues of Eighteen Arhats sitting on the seats before both sides of the gable walls.

=== Buddhist Texts Library ===
The Buddhist Texts Library houses a set of Chinese Buddhist canon, which were printed in the 1730s.

=== Pagoda of Dharmachakra ===
The Pagoda of Dharmachakra was built in 1662, in the 2nd year of Kangxi period (1662–1722) in the Qing dynasty (1644–1911). It was refurbished in 1994. The pagoda has seven stories and is octagonal in plan. The body was engraved with 32 statues of Buddha.
