= Portrait of Winston Churchill (Orpen) =

Painting by William Orpen

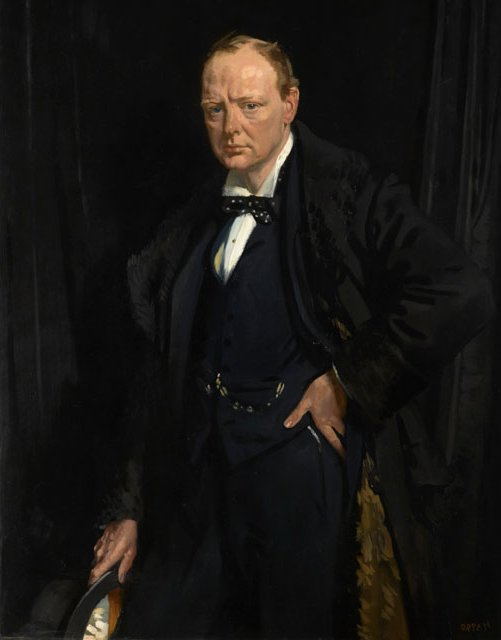
- Artist: William Orpen
- Year: 1916
- Type: Oil on canvas, portrait painting
- Dimensions: 148 cm × 102.5 cm (58 in × 40.4 in)
- Location: National Portrait Gallery, London

Portrait of Winston Churchill is a 1916 portrait painting by the Irish artist William Orpen depicting the British politician Winston Churchill. Churchill had recently served First Lord of the Admiralty and had been a major architect of the Gallipoli Campaign, which ended in failure with heavy losses. The picture was commissioned by the press baron Lord Rothermere.

At the time he sat for the portrait Churchill was under the shadow of the Dardanelles Commission which investigated the disastrous campaign. Churchill himself appreciated the effect of Orpen's work. "It is not the picture of a man, it is the picture of a man's soul". Churchill himself took up painting at this time and the two men became friends. The painting was displayed at the Royal Academy Exhibition of 1917 held at Burlington House in London. Today it is part of the Churchill Chattels Trust but is on long-term loan to the National Portrait Gallery.

== See also ==
- List of paintings by William Orpen

== Bibliography ==
- Black, Jonathan. Winston Churchill in British Art, 1900 to the Present Day: The Titan With Many Faces. Bloomsbury Publishing, 2017.
- Longford, Elizabeth. Winston Churchill: A Pictorial Life Story, Authorized by the Winston Churchill Foundation. Rand McNally, 1974.
- Upstone, Robert & Jenkins, David Fraser. William Orpen: Politics, Sex & Death. Philip Wilson, 2005.
