= The Piano Lesson (Matisse) =

Painting by Henri Matisse

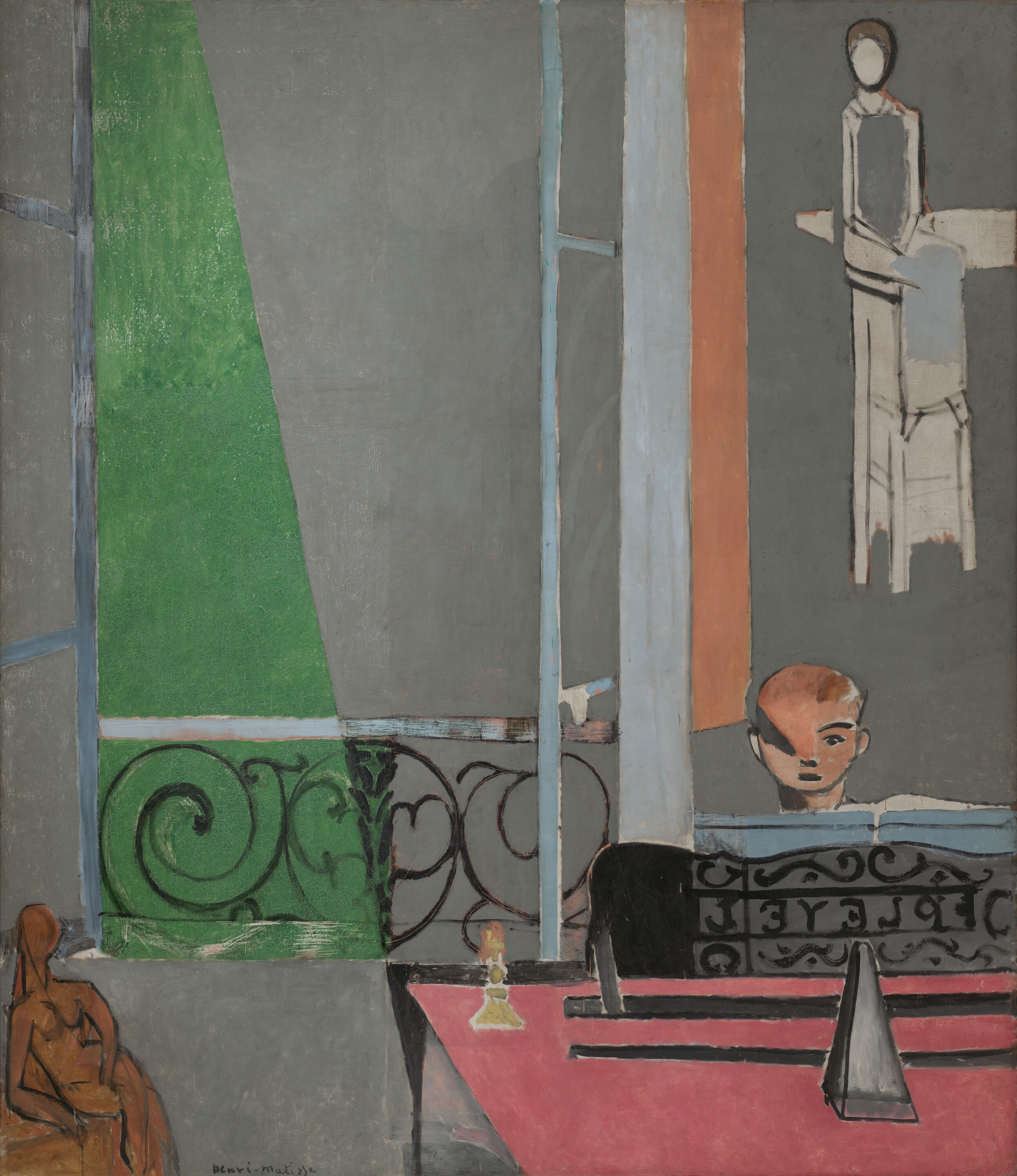
- Artist: Henri Matisse
- Year: 1916
- Medium: Oil on canvas
- Dimensions: 245.11 cm × 212.725 cm (96.50 in × 83.750 in)
- Location: The Museum of Modern Art; New York

The Piano Lesson depicts the living room of Henri Matisse's home in Issy-les-Moulineaux, with his younger son, Pierre, at the piano, the artist's sculpture Decorative Figure (1908), at bottom left, and, at upper right, his painting Woman on a High Stool. Matisse began with a naturalistic drawing, but he eliminated detail as he worked, scraping down areas and rebuilding them broad fields of color. The painting evokes a specific moment in time—light suddenly turned on in a darkening interior—by the triangle of shadow on the boy's face and the rhyming green triangle of light falling on the garden. The artist's incising on the window frame and stippling on the left side produce a pitted quality that suggests the eroding effects of light or time, a theme reiterated by the presence of the metronome and burning candle on the piano.

This painting, The Moroccans (1915), and Bathers by a River (1909–10, May–November 1913, and early spring 1916–October (?) 1917) were all painted at the time of the Battle of Verdun.

== See also ==
- List of works by Henri Matisse
