= Jiufen Qingyun Temple =

Taoist temple in Jiufen, Ruifang, New Taipei, Taiwan

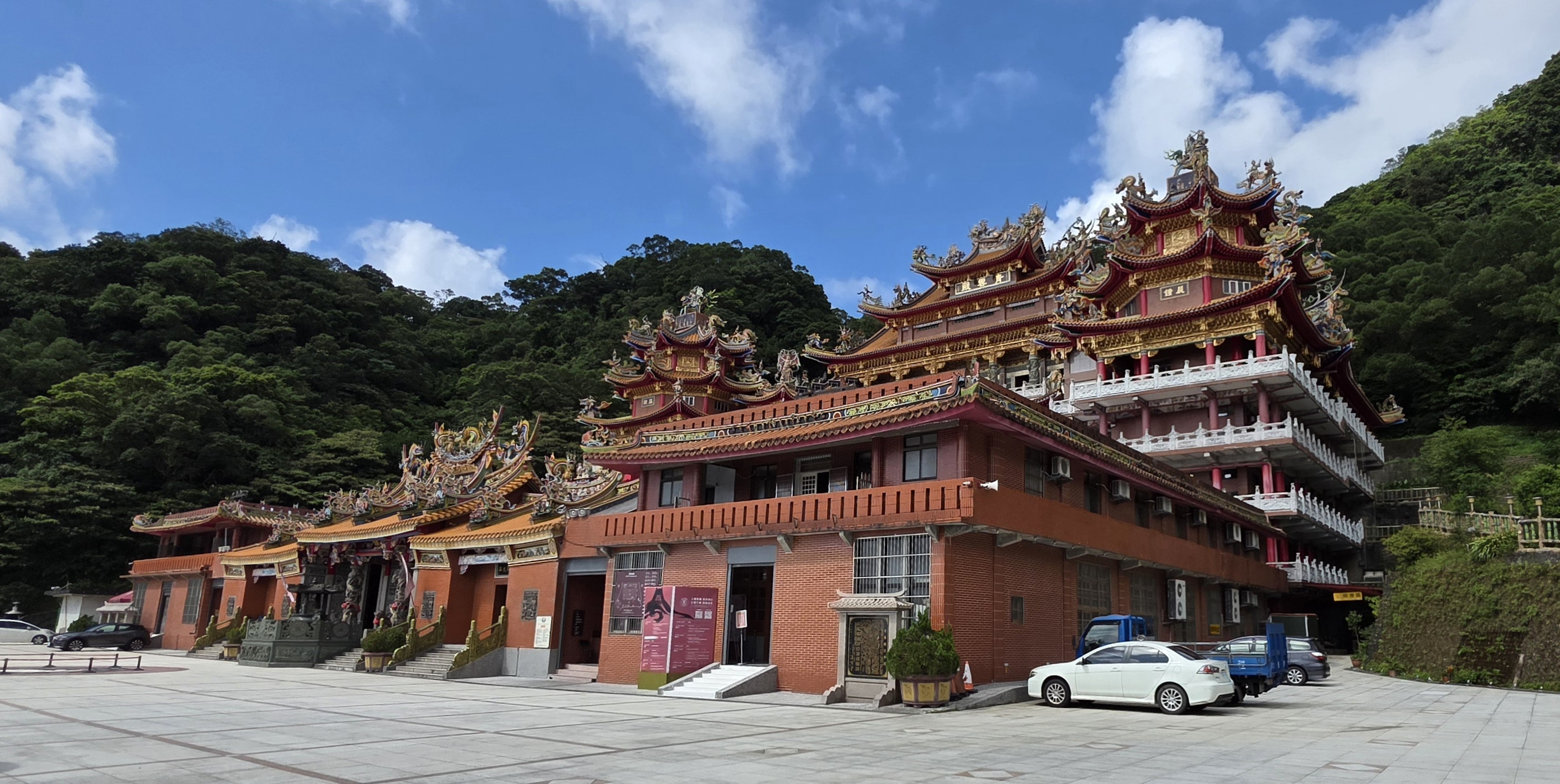
- The temple's exterior, 2023

Location
- Country: Taiwan
- Interactive map of Jiufen Qingyun Temple

Jiufen Qingyun Temple is a Taoist temple in Jiufen, Taiwan.

== See also ==
- List of temples in Taiwan
