= Youth Mourning =

Painting by George Clausen

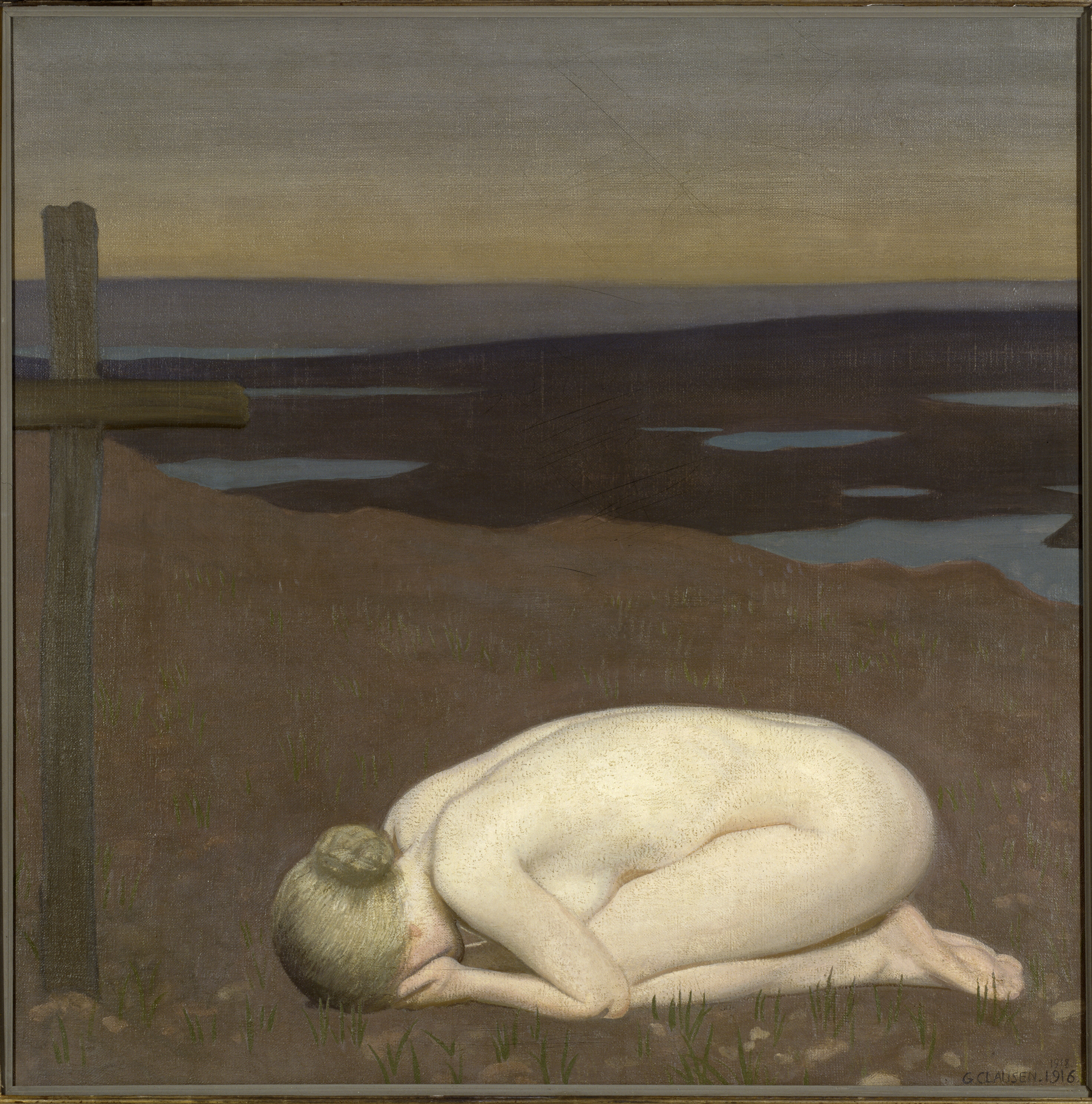
- Artist: George Clausen
- Year: 1916
- Type: Oil on canvas, war art
- Dimensions: 91.4 cm × 91.4 cm (36.0 in × 36.0 in)
- Location: Imperial War Museum; London

Youth Mourning is a 1916 allegorical oil painting by the British artist George Clausen.

== History and description ==
Painted at the height of the First World War it features a nude young woman, who is a personification of youth, kneeling before a wooden cross in a desolate landscape resembling No man's land during the trench warfare of the conflict. In the background are flooded shell craters.

Clausen's daughter Katherine's fiancée was killed in action on 12 March 1915 on the Western Front. The artist produced this work to commemorate the fallen and the grief of those at home. The painting was displayed at the Royal Academy's Summer Exhibition of 1916 at Burlington House in Piccadilly, receiving generally complimentary reviews for its pathos. Today it is part of the collection of the Imperial War Museum in London.

== Bibliography ==
- Smith, Elsie Lawton. Evelyn Pickering De Morgan and the Allegorical Body. Fairleigh Dickinson University Press, 2002.
