= Dahao =

Area of Shantou, Guangdong, China

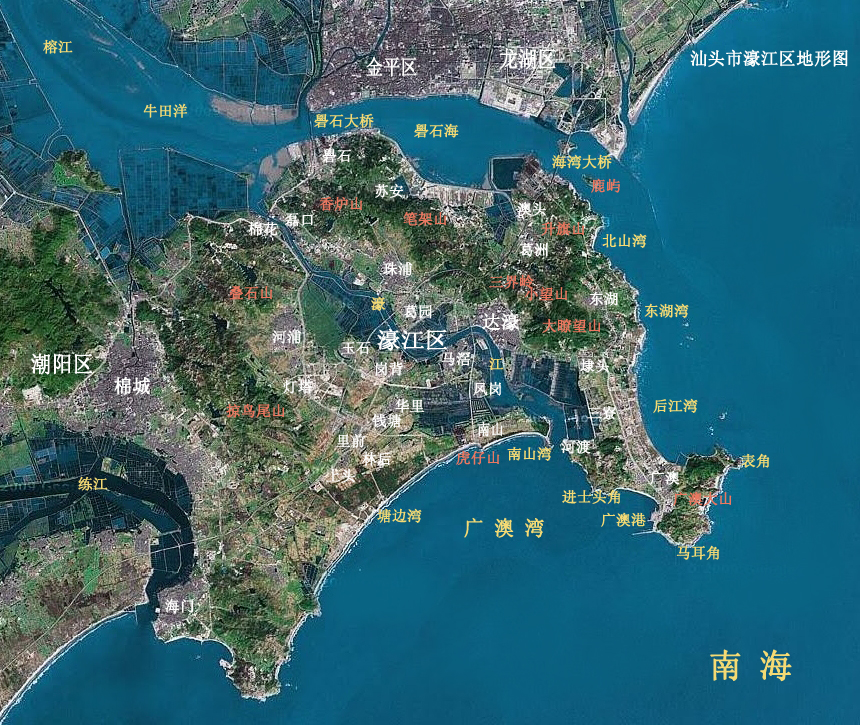
Dahao

Dahao (達濠 Dáháo) is a suburban area of Shantou, China, located along the Haojiang River in the eastern coastal portion of Guangdong Province. The area extends from Guang’ao Street (广澳路) westward to Shenshan Expressway, and contains the governmental offices of the Haojiang District. The population of Dahao is approximately 73,000, of which approximately 30,000 are Overseas Chinese from Hong Kong, Macau and Taiwan.

== History ==
Dahao District is named after Dahao Mountain. It originally belonged to Chaoyang county. In 1958, Dahao District was designated as a suburb of Shantou, called “Dahao Commune”(达濠公社). In 1961, it belonged to Chaoyang county, but in 1974, it again was considered a suburb of Shantou. In 1980, Dahao was renamed Dahao Town. In 1984, Shantou formally established Dahao District. In 2003, Haojiang District was established and Dahao District merged with it.

== Climate ==
Dahao is located just south of the Tropic of Cancer. It has a humid subtropical climate (Köppen classification Cfa) which is dominated by seasonal monsoon patterns. In the winter, northern winds from high-latitude areas are cold and dry; in the summer, winds are from the south and are warm and moist, bringing heavy rains. The average annual temperature is 22 degrees Celsius.

== Language ==
The languages most commonly spoken is Chaoshan dialect.

== Tourist attractions ==
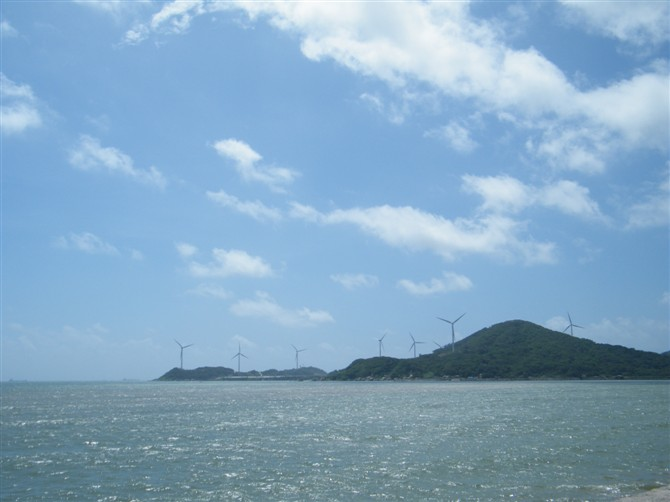
Beishan Bay

Resorts and attractions in Dahao include: “Qing Yunyan Resort” (青云岩风景区), “Beishan Bay Resort” (北山湾度假区) and the largest mangrove ecological zone of China. The “Qing Yun Monastery” (青云禅寺) and the “Dahao Ancient City” (达濠古城), were built in the Qing Dynasty.

=== Beishan Bay Resort ===
Built in 1993, Beishan Bay Resort is located in the northeast of Dahao Peninsula. It covers 4.1 square kilometers. It is surrounded by mountains, which originally served as a natural defense wall. In 1993, the government built basic infrastructure for local fishermen. In recent years, local government has invested about one million yuan to repair and improve the facilities of Beishan Bay Resort.

=== Dahao Ancicent City ===
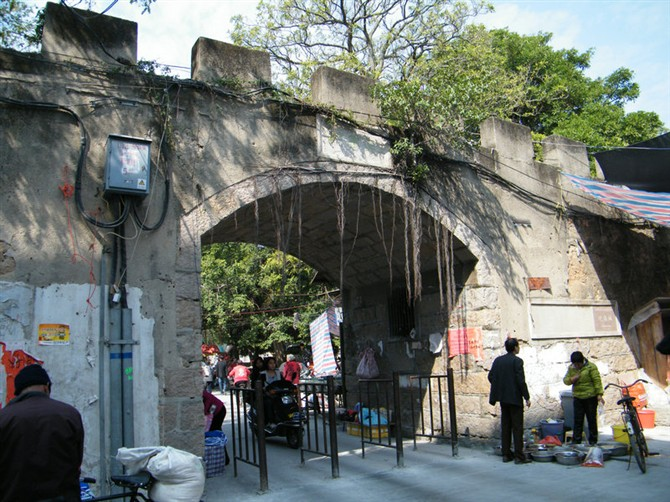
Dhgc

In 2010, Dahao Ancient City was designated as a Guangdong Provincial Cultural Relic. The Ancient City covers 0.014 square kilometers, and is the only well-preserved city in China, dating from the Qing Dynasty. In 1939, during World War II, Japanese armies occupied the area. In the Chinese Civil War, Dahao Ancient City was a stronghold of Communist Party forces. After 1950, Dahao Ancient City was rebuilt and became a tourist draw.

== Local food ==
Dahao Fish Balls and Rice Pastry are the most popular snacks in Dahao.

=== Dahao Fish Balls ===
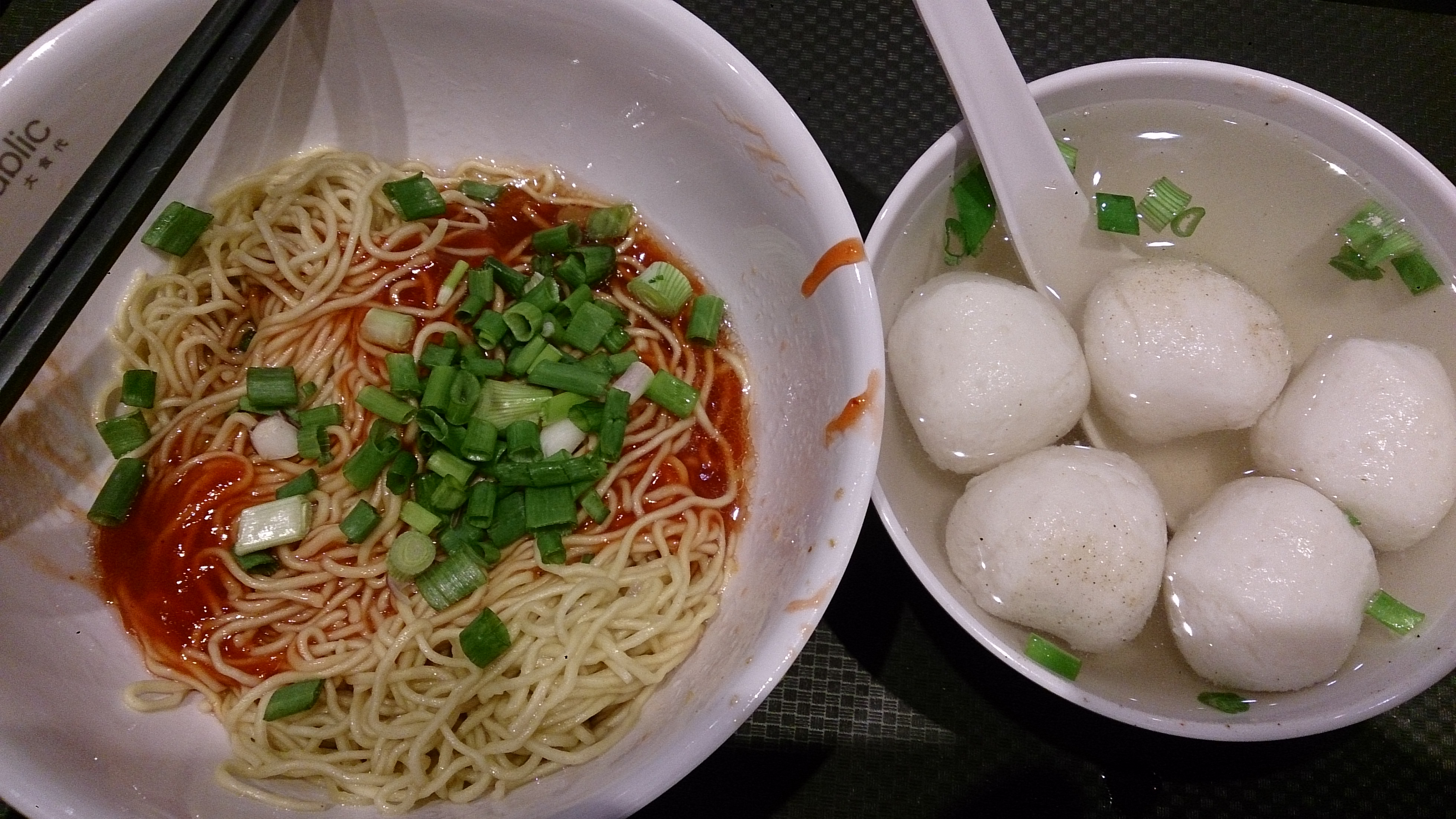
fish balls

According to Chinese tradition, the custom of eating fish balls originated in the Spring and Autumn period. One popular legend is that King Ping of Chu liked eating fish, however, when a fish bone stuck in his throat, he put the cook to death. Many cooks then died because of that reason. As a result, an imaginative cook came up with the idea to separate the bones from the fish and shape the chopped meat into round balls.

=== Rice pastry ===
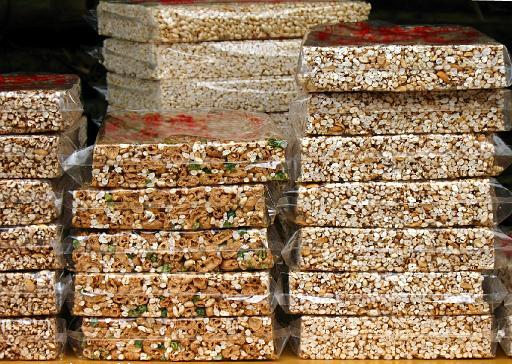
Dahao Rice Snack

The Rice Pastry is made from five ingredients: glutinous rice, sugar, malt sugar and lard.

== Industry ==
Dahao has urbanized significantly in recent decades and emphasized the development of local industry. Traditional craft became successful. The products produced by these enterprises are sold in trade fairs and to more than 40 countries, including Japan and countries in Europe and Southeast Asia.
