= Werner G. Scharff =

American fashion designer

Werner Scharff
- Born: July 7, 1916; Landau, Germany
- Died: August 17, 2006 (aged 90); Santa Monica, California, U.S.

Werner G. Scharff (July 7, 1916 – August 17, 2006) was a German-American arts patron, fashion designer, and land developer. He was co-founder and chairman of Lanz Incorporated, a designer and manufacturer of dresses and nightgowns. The Lanz flannel granny nightgown became a staple of women's nightwear in the late-1950s. As a large landowner, Scharff has been called a pioneer of Venice Beach in Los Angeles for contributing to the development and expansion of the city. His investments include the Cadillac Hotel, Beach House on Ocean Front Walk, L.A. Louver, and James Beach Cafe.

== Early life ==
Scharff was born in Landau, Germany, the youngest of three brothers. His father, a grocer, died when Scharff was 10, forcing him to leave school and join the family's grocery business. By age 20, Scharff, with the family business failing, used his savings to move with his brother Kurt to New York City in 1937, arriving as political refugees.

== Career ==
Once in New York, Scharff and his brother partnered with Austrian retailer Sepp Lanz, an émigré, in his Austrian-style clothes and sleepwear retail store. Scharff soon discovered there was a demand for the clothing line in California. In 1938, the Scharffs and Lanz relocated to Los Angeles to open a store location on Wilshire Boulevard, specializing in Austrian-inspired ski clothing and sleepwear. When American film actress Hedy Lamarr wore their clothes in the film Ziegfeld Girl, the company received film credits, which gave the Lanz line national attention.

In 1946, the Scharff brothers bought the business from Lanz and focused on manufacturing. The same year, Scharff encouraged nearby clothing retailers to sell the line in their stores. At the same time, the company established a wholesale business with department stores worldwide.

=== Lanz flannel granny nightgown ===
In 1953, Scharff designed and unveiled a nightgown line, "the granny gown," which was made of inexpensive cotton flannel and became Lanz Inc.’s signature product. It was based on a dress that Scharff's landlady had worn. By the late 1950s, the gown was a popular cover-up for women. As a result, the company expanded to 30 retail stores and established a manufacturing division. Playwright Wendy Wasserstein was known to have worn a Lanz nightgown while writing.

=== Venice Beach ===
In the 1950s, Scharff began buying and refurbishing properties in Venice, Los Angeles. During a lengthy downturn with businesses on the oceanfront, he helped design a master plan for the community that included storefronts. He became one of the largest property owners in Venice.

Scharff commissioned artwork and murals in Venice Beach as well, many by artist Rip Cronk, who credits his career to Scharff. Cronk's murals commissioned by Scharff include a self portrait, depicting the artist as a superhero; a tribute to van Gogh's "Starry Night" at Wave Crest and Ocean Front Walk; and a portrait of Venice founder Abbot Kinney that highlights a five-story brick apartment building Scharff once owned on Venice Boulevard.

In 2006, Scharff was awarded The Spirit of Venice Award by the Los Angeles City Council.

In 2017, muralist Jonas Never depicted Scharff driving through Venice in his convertible, in a mural across from James Beach.

== Personal life ==
Scharff was married three times and divorced twice. He had five children. His third wife, Simone Hormel Scharff, had children from her previous marriage, including musician Smokey Hormel.

In the early-2000s, Scharff was diagnosed with Parkinson’s disease. He died at his Santa Monica, California home on August 17, 2006. He is survived by his wife, Simone; his sons, Christopher and Peter; his daughter, Alexis; two stepsons, Christopher and Gregory Hormel; a stepdaughter, Angela Hormel; and six grandchildren.
