= Wu Shixian =

Chinese painter (?–1916)

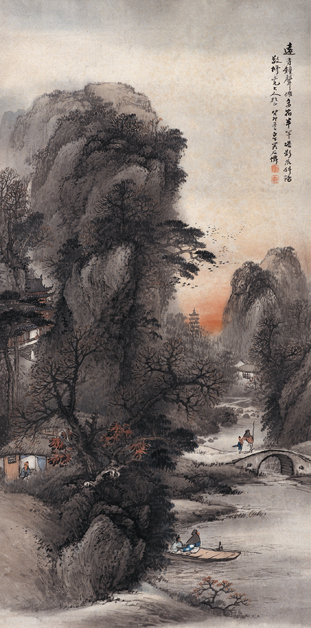
A distant view of the temple in the sunset (1903), the National Art Museum of China

Wu Shixian (Wu Shih-hsien, traditional: 吳石仙, simplified: 吴石仙, pinyin: Wú Shíxiān), also known as Wu Qingyun; ca. (unknown-1916) was a Chinese landscape painter during the Qing dynasty (1644–1912). His specific year of birth is unknown.

Wu was born in Nanjing in the Jiangsu province, and later lived in Shanghai and Japan. His style name was 'Shixian' and his sobriquet was 'splash-ink monk'. Wu specialized in painting foggy and rainy landscapes. The quality of his landscapes is sometimes attributed to his knowledge of Western Art, which at the time was already available in Shanghai.
