= Yun =

Yun may refer to:

- Yǔn, Chinese name of Xionites, a nomadic tribe of Central Asia
- Yun (Chinese name) (云/雲), a Chinese family name
- Yun (ancient surname), an ancient Chinese surname
- Yeon, or Yun, Korean (or Dutch given name) family name
- Yun (Korean surname), or Yoon, Korean family name
- Yun (restaurant), in Seoul, South Korea
- Yun (Street Fighter), a Street Fighter character
- Yun OS, mobile operation system developed by Alibaba
- Yun County, Hubei, in China
- Yun County, Yunnan, in China
- Yunnan, abbreviated as Yún, province of China
- Brother Yun, a Chinese Christian
- Arduino Yún, a single-board microcontroller
- YUN, ISO 4217 code for Yugoslav Convertible dinar
